= Baron Herbert of Lea =

Title in the Peerage of the United Kingdom

Baron Herbert of Lea, of Lea in the County of Wiltshire, is a title in the Peerage of the United Kingdom, since 1862 a subsidiary title of the earldom of Pembroke.

The barony was created in 1861 for the politician Sidney Herbert, the fourth son of George Herbert, 11th Earl of Pembroke, and the territorial designation referred to Lea, Wiltshire.

Lord Herbert of Lea died only a few months after his elevation to the peerage and was succeeded by his son George, the second Baron, who the following year succeeded a cousin in the earldom of Pembroke. The titles remain united, the current holder being William Alexander Sidney Herbert, 18th Earl of Pembroke, 15th Earl of Montgomery. The heir apparent is his son, Reginald Henry Michael Herbert, Lord Herbert, born on 21 October 2012.

== Barons Herbert of Lea (1861) ==
- Sidney Herbert, 1st Baron Herbert of Lea (1810–1861)
- George Robert Charles Herbert, 2nd Baron Herbert of Lea (1850–1895) (succeeded as Earl of Pembroke in 1862)

see Earl of Pembroke, tenth creation, for further succession

== Family tree ==
Pembroke and Montgomery family tree

Lord of Striguil (2nd creation), c. 1155; Earl of Pembroke (1st creation), 1138
Dermot MacMurrough c. 1100–c. 1171; King of Leinster	Gilbert de Clare; 1100–1147; 1st Earl of Pembroke, etc.	Isabel de Beaumont former mistress of Henry I c. 1068–1135; King of England
Aoife MacMurrough c. 1153–c. 1188	Richard de Clare; Strongbow; 1130–1176; 2nd Earl of Pembroke, etc.
Earl of Pembroke (2nd creation) and Lord of Striguil (3rd creation), 1199
Hugh X of Lusignan c. 1183–1249; Count of La Marche	Isabella c. 1186/1188 – 1246; Countess of Angoulême	John; 1166/1667 – 1216; King of England	William Marshal; 1146/1147 – 1219; 1st Earl of Pembroke, etc.	Isabel de Clare; 1172–1220; 4th Earl of Pembroke, etc. suo jure	Gilbert de Clare; 1173–1185; 3rd Earl of Pembroke, etc.
Earldom of Pembroke and lordship of Striguil transferred to her husband, 1199
Eleanor of England; 1215–1275	William Marshal; 1190–1231; 2nd Earl of Pembroke, etc.	Richard Marshal c. 1191 – 1234; 3rd Earl of Pembroke, etc.	Gilbert Marshal d. 1241; 4th Earl of Pembroke, etc.	Walter Marshal c. 1199 – 1245; 5th Earl of Pembroke, etc.	Ansel Marshal d. 1245; 6th Earl of Pembroke	Joan Marshal d. 1234
Earldom of Pembroke (2nd creation) and lordship of Striguil extinct, 1245
Earl of Pembroke (3rd creation), 1247
William de Valence c. 1225–1296; 1st Earl of Pembroke	Joan de Munchensi c. 1230–1301; Countess of Pembroke, suo jure
Isabel de Valence d. 1305 m. John Hastings, 1st Baron Hastings; 1262–1312/1313; Baron Hastings	Aymer de Valence c. 1270–1324; 2nd Earl of Pembroke	Marie de St Pol c. 1303 – 1377
Earldom of Pembroke (3rd creation) extinct, 1324
John Hastings; 1286–1325/1326; Baron Hastings	Roger Mortimer; 1287–1330; Earl of March
Earl of Pembroke (4th creation), 1339	Baron Manny, 1347
Edward III; 1312–1377; King of England	Laurence Hastings; 1319–1348; 1st Earl of Pembroke, Baron Hastings	Agnes Mortimer; 1317–1368	Edmund Mortimer; 1302/1303–1331	Katherine Mortimer c. 1314 – 1369 m. Thomas Beauchamp c. 1313 – 1369; Earl of Warwick	Walter Manny d. 1372; 1st Baron Manny
Roger Mortimer; 1328–1360; Earl of March
John of Gaunt; 1340–1399; Duke of Lancaster	Margaret of England; 1346–1361	John Hastings; 1347–1375; 2nd Earl of Pembroke, Baron Hastings	Anne Manny; 1355–1384; 2nd Baroness Manny, suo jure	Edmund Mortimer; 1352–1381; Earl of March	Philippa de Beauchamp a. 1344 – 1386 m. Hugh Stafford c. 1342 – 1386; Earl of Stafford
Henry IV c. 1367 – 1413	Elizabeth of Lancaster a. 1363 – 1426	John Hastings; 1372–1389; 3rd Earl of Pembroke, 3rd Baron Manny, Baron Hastings	Philippa Mortimer; 1375–1440	Roger Mortimer; 1374–1398; Earl of March, Earl of Ulster	Katherine de Stafford c. 1376 – 1419 m. Michael de la Pole; 1367–1415; Earl of Suffolk
Earldom of Pembroke (4th creation) and barony Manny extinct and baron Hastings dormant, 1389
Earl of Pembroke (5th creation), 1414	Earl of Pembroke (6th creation), 1447
Catherine of Valois; 1401–1437	Henry V 1386–1422	Humphrey of Lancaster; 1390–1447; Duke of Gloucester, Earl of Pembroke	Anne Mortimer; 1388 – c. 1411	William de la Pole; 1396–1450; Duke of Suffolk, Earl of Pembroke
Earldom of Pembroke (5th creation) reverted to William de la Pole, 1447	Earldom of Pembroke (6th creation) forfeited, 1450
Earl of Pembroke (7th creation), 1452	Baron Herbert of Raglan, 1461; Earl of Pembroke (8th creation), 1468
Jasper Tudor c. 1431 – 1495; Duke of Bedford, Earl of Pembroke	Henry VI; 1421–1471	William Herbert c. 1423 – 1469; 1st Earl of Pembroke, etc.	Richard Woodville; 1405–1469; Earl Rivers	Richard of York; 1411–1460; Duke of York
Earldom of Pembroke (7th creation) forfeit, 1461; restored, 1485; extinct, 1495
Richard Herbert d. 1510	William Herbert; 1451–1491; 2nd Earl of Pembroke, etc., Earl of Huntingdon	Mary Woodville c. 1456 – 1481	Elizabeth Woodville c. 1437 – 1492	Edward IV; 1442–1483
Earldom of Pembroke (8th creation) surrendered in lieu of earldom of Huntingdon, 1479	For future Barons Herbert, see Duke of Beaufort and Earl of Worcester
Earl of Pembroke (9th creation), 1479
Thomas Parr; 1478–1517	Elizabeth of York; 1466–1503 m. Henry VII; 1457–1509	Edward Plantagenet; 1470–1483; Earl of Pembroke, later Edward V
Earldom of Pembroke (9th creation) merged in the crown, 1483
Earl of Pembroke (10th creation) and Baron Herbert of Cardiff, 1551	Marquess of Pembroke, 1532
Henry Grey; 1517–1554; Duke of Suffolk	William Herbert; 1501–1570; 1st Earl of Pembroke, etc.	Anne Parr; 1515–1552	Katherine Parr; 1512–1548	Henry VIII; 1491–1547	Anne Boleyn c. 1501 or 1507 – 1536
Marquessate of Pembroke either merged in the crown, 1533 or forfeited, 1536
Jane Grey c. 1536/37 – 1554 disputed Queen of England	Katherine Grey; 1540–1568	Henry Herbert c. 1538 – 1601; 2nd Earl of Pembroke, etc.
Earl of Montgomery and Baron Herbert of Shurland, 1605
Mary Talbot c. 1580–1649	William Herbert; 1580–1630; 3rd Earl of Pembroke, etc.	Philip Herbert; 1584–1650; 4th Earl of Pembroke, etc., 1st Earl of Montgomery, etc.	Susan de Vere; 1587–1629
Mary Villiers; 1622–1685	Charles Herbert styled Lord Herbert of Shurland c. 1619 – 1635	Philip Herbert; 1621–1669; 5th Earl of Pembroke, etc., 2nd Earl of Montgomery, etc.	James Herbert c. 1623 – 1677
William Herbert; 1641–1674; 6th Earl of Pembroke, etc., 3rd Earl of Montgomery, etc.	Philip Herbert; 1652/1653–1683; 7th Earl of Pembroke, etc., 4th Earl of Montgomery, etc.	Thomas Herbert c. 1656 – 1733; 8th Earl of Pembroke, etc., 5th Earl of Montgomery, etc.	James Herbert; 1660–1704
Philip Herbert c. 1689 – 1750; 9th Earl of Pembroke, etc., 6th Earl of Montgomery, etc.	Robert Sawyer Herbert; 1693–1769	Thomas Herbert c. 1695 – 1739	William Herbert c. 1696 – 1757	Nicholas Herbert c. 1706 – 1775
Baron Porchester, 1780; Earl of Carnarvon (3rd creation), 1793
Henry Herbert; 1734–1794; 10th Earl of Pembroke, etc., 7th Earl of Montgomery, etc. m. Elizabeth Spencer; 1737–1831	Henry Herbert; 1741–1811; 1st Earl of Carnarvon, etc. m. Elizabeth Wyndham; 1752–1826
George Augustus Herbert; 1759–1827; 11th Earl of Pembroke, etc., 8th Earl of Montgomery, etc. m. Yekaterina Semyonovna Vorontsova; 1783–1856	Henry George Herbert; 1772–1833; 2nd Earl of Carnarvon, etc. m. Kitty Herbert; 1772–1813	Charles Herbert; 1774–1808	William Herbert; 1778–1847	Algernon Herbert; 1792–1855
Baron Herbert of Lea, 1861
Robert Herbert; 1791–1862; 12th Earl of Pembroke, etc., 9th Earl of Montgomery, etc.	Sidney Herbert; 1810–1861; 1st Baron Herbert of Lea m. Mary Elizabeth Ashe à Court-Repington; 1822–1911	Catherine Herbert; 1814–1886 m. Alexander Edward Murray; 1804–1845; Earl of Dunmore	Henry John George Herbert; 1800–1849; 3rd Earl of Carnarvon, etc.
George Robert Charles Herbert; 1850–1895; 13th Earl of Pembroke, etc., 10th Earl of Montgomery, etc., 2nd Baron Herbert of Lea	Sidney Herbert; 1853–1913; 14th Earl of Pembroke, etc., 110th Earl of Montgomery, etc., 3rd Baron Herbert of Lea	Henry Howard Molyneux Herbert; 1831–1890; 4th Earl of Carnarvon, etc.	Auberon Edward William Molyneux Howard Herbert; 1838–1906
Reginald Herbert; 1880–1960; 15th Earl of Pembroke, etc., 12th Earl of Montgomery, etc., 4th Baron Herbert of Lea	George Edward Stanhope Molyneux Herbert; 1866–1923; 5th Earl of Carnarvon, etc. m. Almina Victoria Maria Alexandra Wombwell; 1876–1969	Aubrey Nigel Henry Molyneux Herbert; 1880–1923	Mervyn Robert Howard Molyneux Herbert; 1882–1929
Patricia Caroline Beatrix Herbert; 1904–1994 m. William Henry Smith; 1903–1948; Viscount Hambleden	Sidney Herbert; 1906–1969; 16th Earl of Pembroke, etc., 13th Earl of Montgomery, etc., 5th Baron Herbert of Lea	David Alexander Reginald Herbert; 1908–1995	Henry George Alfred Marius Victor Francis Herbert; 1898–1987; 6th Earl of Carnarvon, etc. m. Anne Catherine Tredick Wendell; 1900–1977	Evelyn Leonora Almina Herbert; 1901–1980
Henry George Charles Alexander Herbert; 1939–2003; 17th Earl of Pembroke, etc., 14th Earl of Montgomery, etc., 6th Baron Herbert of Lea	Henry George Reginald Molyneux Herbert; 1924–2001; 7th Earl of Carnarvon, etc. m. Jean Margaret Wallop; 1935–2011
Emma Louise Herbert b. 1969	William Alexander Sidney Herbert b. 1978; 18th Earl of Pembroke, etc., 15th Earl of Montgomery, etc., 7th Baron Herbert of Lea	George Reginald Oliver Molyneux Herbert b. 1956; 8th Earl of Carnarvon, etc.
Reginald Herbert b. 2014 styled Lord Herbert	George Herbert b. 1992 styled Lord Porchester
Heir apparent to the earldoms of Pembroke and Montgomery	Heir apparent to the earldom of Carnarvon
