= Portrait of Sidney Herbert =

1847 painting by Francis Grant

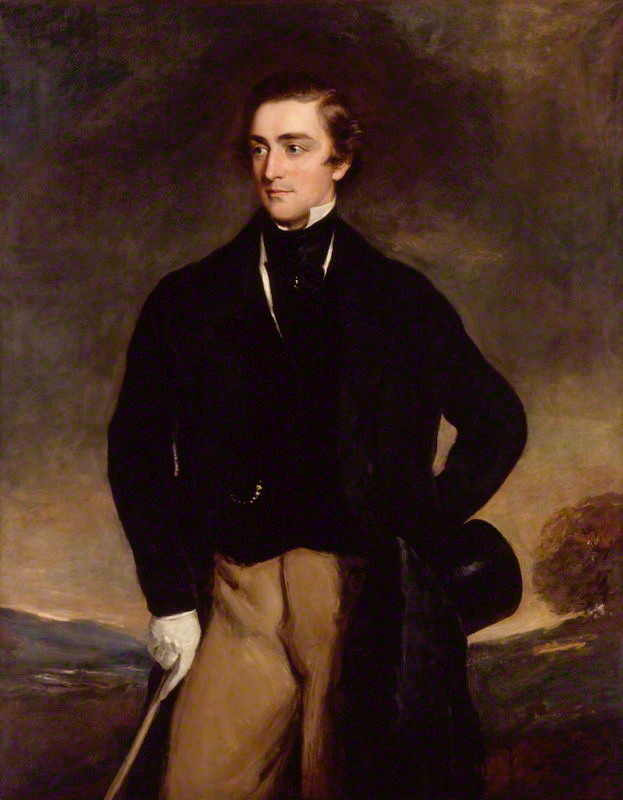
- Artist: Francis Grant
- Year: 1847
- Type: Oil on canvas, portrait painting
- Dimensions: 142.9 cm × 111.8 cm (56.3 in × 44.0 in)
- Location: National Portrait Gallery, London

Portrait of Sidney Herbert is an oil on canvas portrait painting by the British artist Francis Grant, from 1847. It depicts the British politician Sidney Herbert, who later became Lord Herbert. It is held at the National Portrait Gallery, in London.

== History ==
The son of George Herbert, 11th Earl of Pembroke and his Russian wife Catherine Vorontsov, Herbert was a Liberal politician. Secretary at War during the early stages of the Crimean War. He is known for his strong support of Florence Nightingale's improvement in medical conditions for the British Army.

Grant was a leading portraitist of the early Victorian era and was later elected President of the Royal Academy. It has been described as one of Grant's finest portraits along with his Portrait of Sir James Brooke from the same year. Grant appears to have known Herbert well and shows him as a quieter, more introverted figure than Brook. He is depicted with a landscape as a background, with his cane, looking to the right side.

The painting was displayed at the Royal Academy Exhibition of 1847, held at the National Gallery, in London. Today it is in the collection of the National Portrait Gallery, having been acquired in 1912. A replica is at Wilton House in Wiltshire, his family's ancestral home.

== Bibliography ==
- Ormond, Richard. Early Victorian Portraits, National Portrait Gallery, 1974.
- Wills, Catherine. High Society: The Life and Art of Sir Francis Grant, 1803–1878. National Galleries of Scotland, 2003.
