= 49 Belgrave Square =

House in Belgravia, London, England

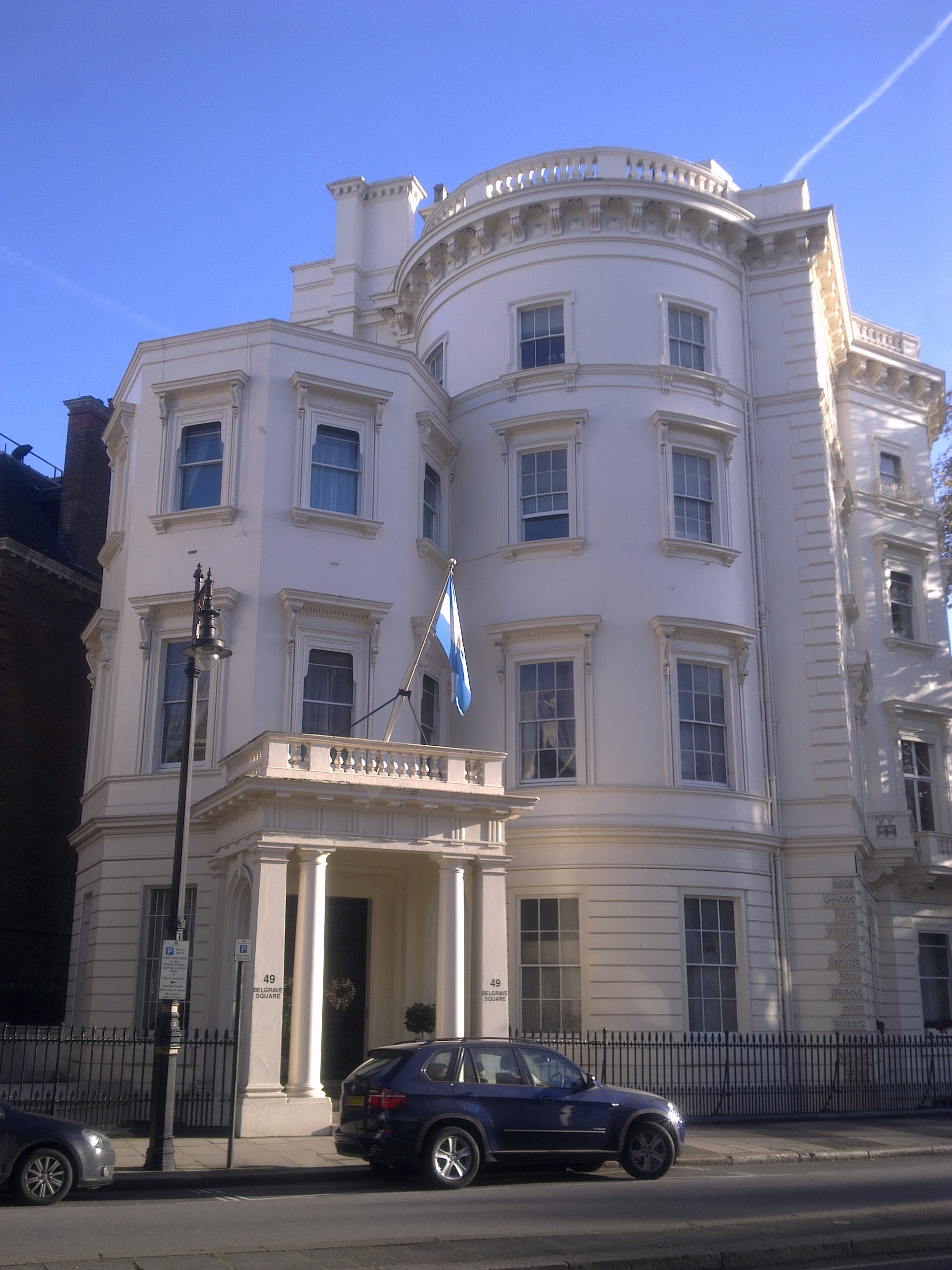
- Interactive map of the 49 Belgrave Square area
- Former names: Independent North Mansion; Belgrave Villa

General information
- Location: Belgravia, London, England
- Coordinates: 51.5006°N 0.1532°W
- Current tenants: Argentine Ambassador
- Owner: Government of Argentina

49 Belgrave Square is a Grade II* listed house in Belgrave Square, Belgravia, London.

The mansion was finished in 1851, designed by Thomas Cubitt. In 1859, Mayhew & Knight built the entrance and added the octagonal lobby.

It was originally known as the "Independent North Mansion".

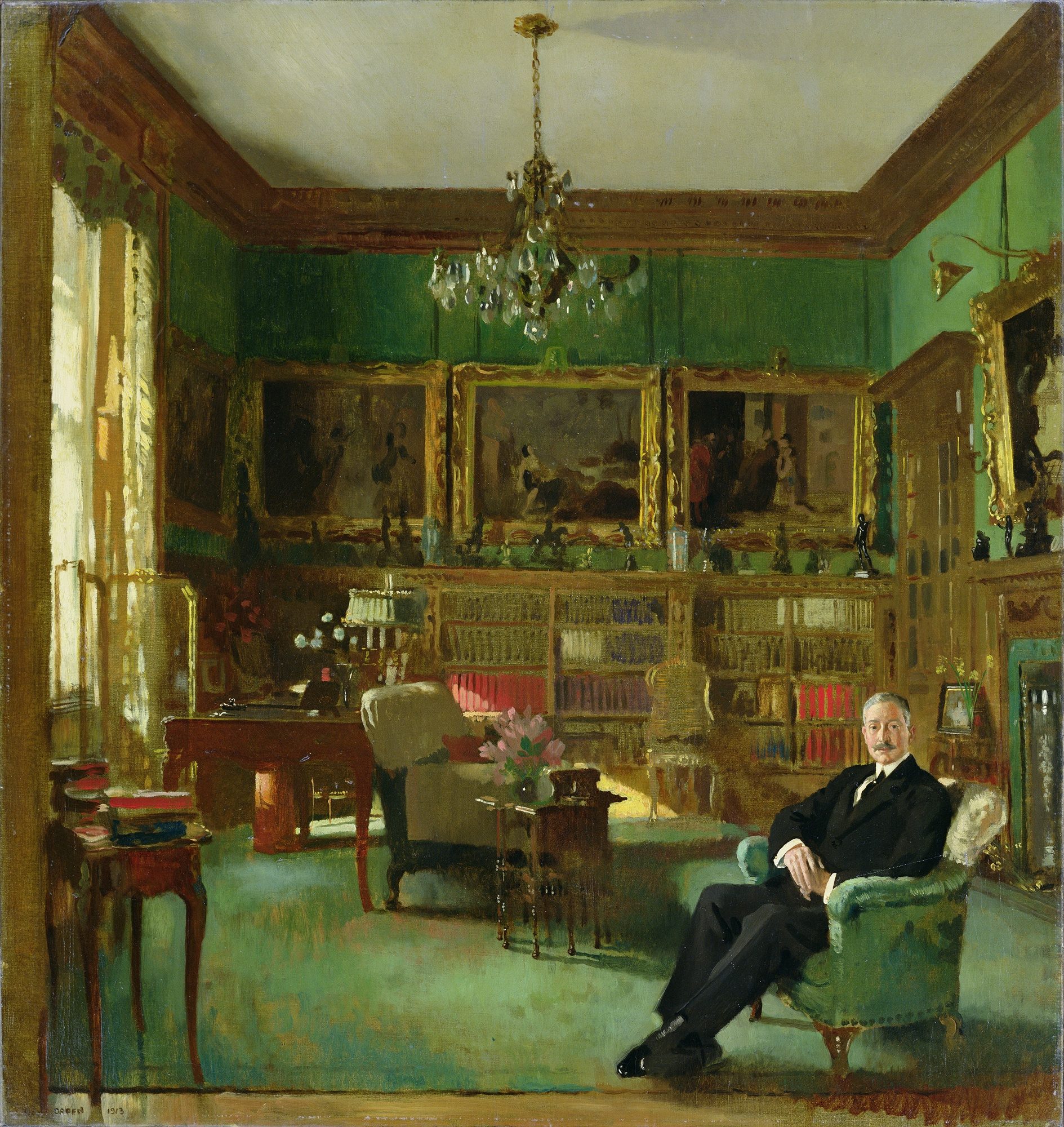
Sir Otto Beit in his study at 49 Belgrave Square by William Orpen, 1913, Johannesburg Art Gallery

The first owner, Sidney Herbert, 1st Baron Herbert of Lea, named it "Belgrave Villa" but it was colloquial called Herbert House. His son, Sidney Herbert, 14th Earl of Pembroke, was born there in 1853.

Following Lord Herbert's death in 1861, the lease of 49 Belgrave Square was acquired by Charles Gordon-Lennox, 6th Duke of Richmond in May 1862. The house remained the residence of the Duke of Richmond and his family for the remainder of the nineteenth century; following the Duke's death in 1903, the lease of the house was sold in January 1904. At the time of the sale, the lease had a remaining term of 16 years, with a ground rent payable of £150 annually for the house and £40 annually for the associated stabling.

The house was subsequently acquired by Alfred Beit, and his brother Sir Otto Beit inherited it in 1906. His son Sir Alfred Beit, 2nd Baronet, grew up there and on his father's death in 1930 inherited the house, together with his large art collection. He relocated to Kensington Palace Gardens, and sold the house in 1936.

The building was acquired by Argentina in 1936, and has since been used as that country's Ambassador's official London residence. It has been opened to the public on one weekend a year since 2006, as part of Open House London, which notes the "sumptuous interiors still intact".

During the Second World War, the house became a meeting place and haven for Argentines who volunteered in the British forces, mostly as pilots.
