= Philip Goldsworthy =

British Army general

Lieutenant-General Philip Goldsworthy
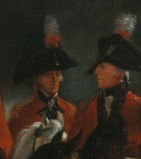
- Goldsworthy (left) with David Dundas, from George III and the Prince of Wales Reviewing Troops, 1798

Member of Parliament for Wilton
- In office 1 January 1801 – 4 January 1801
- Preceded by: Himself
- Succeeded by: John Spencer

Member of the Great Britain Parliament for Wilton
- In office 15 February 1794 – 1 January 1801
- Preceded by: Lord Herbert
- Succeeded by: Himself
- In office 2 February 1785 – January 1788
- Preceded by: Lord Herbert
- Succeeded by: Lord Herbert

Personal details
- Born: 1737 Leghorn, Italy
- Died: 4 January 1801 Wilton, Wiltshire
- Occupation: Army officer

Military service
- Years of service: 1756–1801
- Rank: Lieutenant-General

Philip Goldsworthy (c. 1737 – 1801) was a British Army officer. He was a Member of Parliament for Wilton and chief equerry to King George III. Goldsworthy was a Lieutenant General and Colonel of The Royals.

== Personal life and family ==
Goldsworthy was the second son of Burrington Goldsworthy, British consul at Leghorn and later Cádiz, and his wife Philippia Vanbrugh niece of Sir John Vanbrugh. He was baptised at Leghorn on the 18 October 1737.

== Military career ==
Goldsworthy was commissioned as a cornet in the 1st Dragoons in 1756. He was promoted to lieutenant in 1760, to captain in 1768 and to major in 1776. He went on to be promoted to lieutenant colonel in 1779 and to colonel in 1784 and was appointed chief equerry (to the King) and clerk martial on 9 March 1788. He was then promoted to major general in 1793 and to lieutenant general in 1799. He served as colonel of 1st (Royal) Regiment of Dragoons from 23 January 1794 until his death.

== Parliament ==
He represented the parliamentary borough of Wilton in Wiltshire during two terms in the Parliament of Great Britain and shortly in the Parliament of the United Kingdom. He served from 2 February 1785 to January 1788, and 15 February 1794 to 4 January 1801.

== Posterity ==
He died unmarried at his seat Wilton Wiltshire 4 January 1801.

Military offices
Preceded by Henry, Earl of Pembroke	Colonel of the 1st (Royal) Regiment of Dragoons; 1794–1801	Succeeded by Thomas Garth
