= John Spencer (1767–1831) =

British politician (1767-1831)

Member of Parliament for Wilton
- In office 12 February 1801 – 24 May 1804
- Preceded by: Philip Goldsworthy
- Succeeded by: Ralph Sheldon

Personal details
- Born: 21 December 1767
- Died: 17 December 1831 (aged 63) Breda
- Spouse: Lady Elizabeth Spencer (m. 1790)
- Parent: Lord Charles Spencer (father)
- Relatives: George Spencer (father-in-law)
- Education: Harrow School

John Spencer was a British Politician who served as MP for Wilton from 1801 to 1804. He was the son of Lord Charles Spencer. He married his cousin, Lady Elizabeth Spencer, the daughter of George Spencer, 4th Duke of Marlborough in 1790.
