= George Herbert, 13th Earl of Pembroke =

English noble (1850–1895)

The Right Honourable The Earl of Pembroke
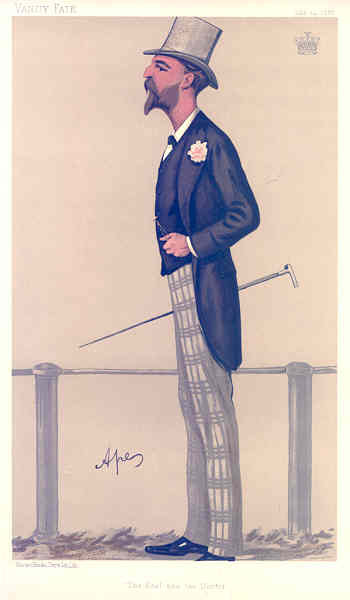
- "The Earl and the Doctor"; Herbert as caricatured by Ape (Carlo Pellegrini) in Vanity Fair, July 1888

Under-Secretary of State for War
- In office 2 March 1874 – 24 May 1875
- Monarch: Victoria
- Prime Minister: Benjamin Disraeli
- Preceded by: The Marquess of Lansdowne
- Succeeded by: The Earl Cadogan

Personal details
- Born: 6 July 1850
- Died: 3 May 1895 (aged 44)
- Party: Conservative
- Spouse: Lady Gertrude Chetwynd-Talbot (1840–1906)
- Parents: Sidney Herbert (father); Elizabeth Ashe à Court-Repington (mother)

George Robert Charles Herbert, 13th Earl of Pembroke, 10th Earl of Montgomery (6 July 1850 – 3 May 1895), known as The Lord Herbert of Lea from 1861 to 1862, was a British Conservative politician. He was Under-Secretary of State for War under Benjamin Disraeli between 1874 and 1875.

== Background ==
Pembroke was the eldest son of Sidney Herbert, 1st Baron Herbert of Lea, only son of George Augustus Herbert, 11th Earl of Pembroke, by his second wife Catherine (née Countess Woronzow). His mother was Elizabeth Herbert, Baroness Herbert of Lea, daughter of Lieutenant-General Charles Ashe A'Court. He succeeded his father in the barony of Herbert of Lea in 1861 and the following year he inherited the earldom of Pembroke on the death of his uncle.

== Political career ==
Pembroke served as Under-Secretary of State for War from 1874 to 1875 in the second Conservative administration of Benjamin Disraeli.

Lord Pembroke never accepted office again, and rarely spoke in the House of Lords, but he continued to take a keen interest in public affairs, both imperial and domestic, and communicated his views, through various periodicals and by speeches in the country, upon Ireland, the land question, imperial defence, and the navy. He took a leading part in the volunteer movement, holding a commission for upwards of twenty years, and commanding the South Wilts battalion until within a few months of his death. He believed firmly in the advantage of technical instruction, and gave practical proof thereof by building and endowing the Pembroke technical school near Dublin. Lord Pembroke was a good sportsman, having been first a master of harriers for many years, and later of foxhounds; but a bad fall put an end to his hunting, and latterly he spent much of his time afloat, yachting and boat-sailing.

== Family ==
Lord Pembroke married Lady Gertrude Frances, daughter of Henry Chetwynd-Talbot, 18th Earl of Shrewsbury, in 1874. He died in Frankfurt on 3 May 1895, aged 44, and was succeeded in his titles by his younger brother the Honourable Sidney Herbert. The Countess of Pembroke died in September 1906, aged 66.

Political offices
Preceded by The Marquess of Lansdowne	Under-Secretary of State for War; 1874–1875	Succeeded by The Earl Cadogan
Peerage of the United Kingdom
Preceded by Sidney Herbert	Baron Herbert of Lea; 1861–1895	Succeeded by Sidney Herbert
Peerage of England
Preceded by Robert Henry Herbert	Earl of Pembroke; Earl of Montgomery; 1862–1895	Succeeded by Sidney Herbert
