= Sidney Herbert, 14th Earl of Pembroke =

British politician

The Right Honourable The Earl of Pembroke GCVO PC
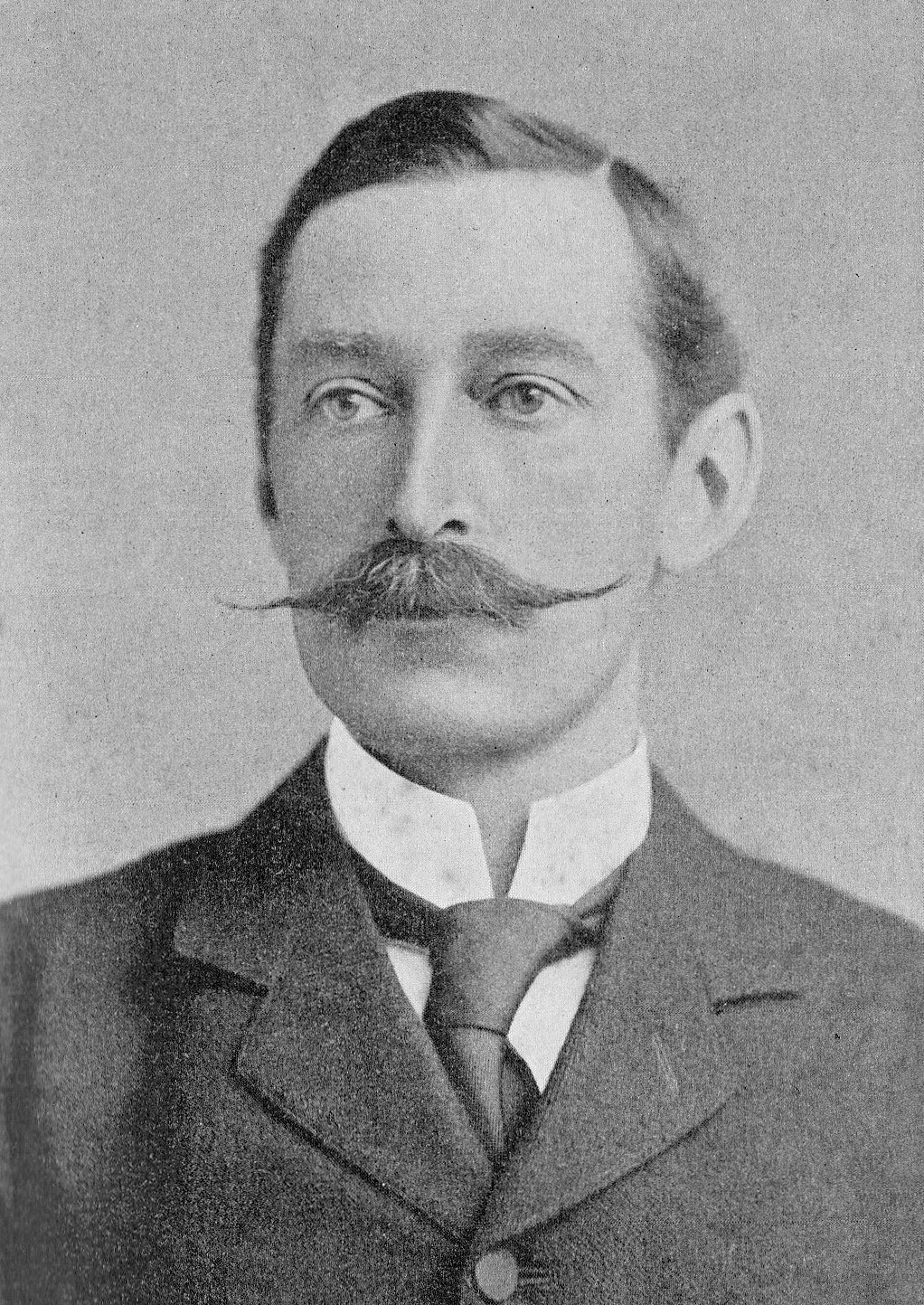
- Lord Pembroke in the late 1890s

Lord Steward of the Household
- In office 16 July 1895 – 4 December 1905
- Monarchs: Victoria; Edward VII
- Prime Minister: The Marquess of Salisbury; Arthur Balfour
- Preceded by: The Marquess of Breadalbane
- Succeeded by: The Earl of Liverpool

Personal details
- Born: 20 February 1853 Belgrave Square, London
- Died: 30 March 1913 (aged 60) Rome, Italy
- Spouse(s): Lady Beatrix Lambton (1859–1944)
- Children: 4
- Parent(s): Sidney Herbert, 1st Baron Herbert of Lea; Elizabeth Ashe à Court-Repington
- Education: Christ Church, Oxford

Sidney Herbert, 14th Earl of Pembroke, 11th Earl of Montgomery, GCVO, PC (20 February 1853 – 30 March 1913), styled The Honourable Sidney Herbert between 1861 and 1895, was a British politician and peer.

== Background and education ==
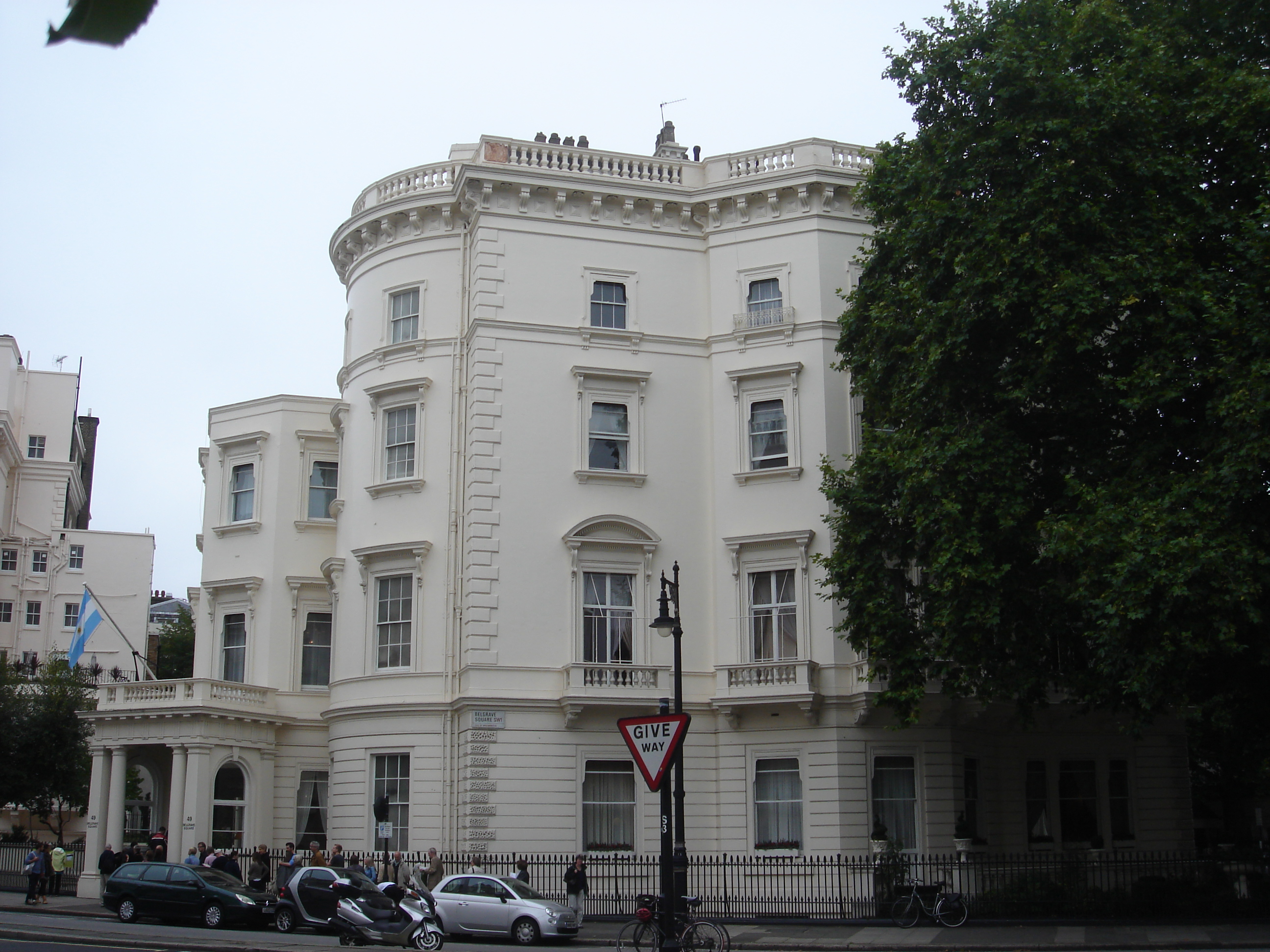
Herbert's birthplace, 49 Belgrave Square

Herbert was born at 49 Belgrave Square, London, the second son of Sidney Herbert, 1st Baron Herbert of Lea (who was the son of George Augustus Herbert, 11th Earl of Pembroke, by his second wife Catherine Woronzow) and Mary Elizabeth, daughter of Lieutenant-General Charles Ashe à Court. George Herbert, 13th Earl of Pembroke, was his elder brother, and Sir Michael Henry Herbert his younger brother. Catherine Woronzow was the daughter of a prominent aristocratic Russian family, the Woronzows. He was educated at Eton and Christ Church, Oxford.

== Political career ==
Herbert was elected as Member of Parliament for Wilton in Wiltshire in 1877 but lost his seat in the 1885 general election. This was somewhat of a shock given that the seat of the Earls of Pembroke was at Wilton House and his family dominated Wiltshire politics. Herbert was then chosen early in 1886 to replace William Grantham, who had just been appointed a judge, in Croydon. He was duly elected and served under Lord Salisbury as a Lord of the Treasury between 1886 and 1892. Although considered an able Member of Parliament, he was perhaps best known for his good looks and was widely regarded as the most handsome MP at the time.

Herbert succeeded his brother as Earl of Pembroke in 1895. He continued his political career in the House of Lords as Lord Steward of the Household under Salisbury and Arthur Balfour between 1895 and 1905. He was sworn of the Privy Council in 1895.

Lord Pembroke became President of the Marylebone Cricket Club for a year in 1896. He had played two games for the MCC in the 1870s scoring a total of 6 runs in 4 innings.

== Family ==
Lord Pembroke married Lady Beatrix Louisa Lambton, daughter of George Lambton, 2nd Earl of Durham, on 29 August 1877. They had two sons and two daughters.

- Lady Beatrix Frances Gertrude Herbert (1878–1957), married firstly Major Sir Nevile Rodwell Wilkinson (d. 22 December 1940) on 29 April 1903. Secondly, on 5 March 1942 she married Ralph Francis Forward-Howard, 7th Earl of Wicklow. She died childless.
- Reginald Herbert, 15th Earl of Pembroke (1880–1960), married Lady Beatrice Eleanor Paget (1883–1973) on 21 January 1904. She was the granddaughter of Henry Paget, 2nd Marquess of Anglesey, and Wellington Stapleton-Cotton, 2nd Viscount Combermere. They had four children.
- Lady Muriel Katherine Herbert (1883–1951), married Dr. Arthur John Jex-Blake on 5 August 1920. They had one daughter.
- Hon. Sir George Sidney Herbert (1886–1942), was created a Baronet in 1937. He never married.

Pembroke died in Rome, Italy, in March 1913, aged 60, and was succeeded in the earldom by his eldest son, Reginald. Lord Pembroke's brother-in-law Hubert Parry composed and premiered an Elegy for organ solo to commemorate the funeral, which took place on 7 April 1913. Beatrix, Countess of Pembroke died in March 1944.

== Honours ==
- United Kingdom: Knight Grand Cross of the Royal Victorian Order, 25 May 1896
- Austria-Hungary: Grand Cross of the Imperial Order of Leopold, 1903

Parliament of the United Kingdom
Preceded by Sir Edmund Antrobus, Bt	Member of Parliament for Wilton; 1877–1885	Succeeded by Thomas Grove
Preceded by William Grantham	Member of Parliament for Croydon; 1886–1895	Succeeded by Charles Ritchie
Political offices
Preceded by The Marquess of Breadalbane	Lord Steward of the Household; 1895–1905	Succeeded by The Earl of Liverpool
Peerage of England
Preceded by George Herbert	Earl of Pembroke; Earl of Montgomery; 1895–1913	Succeeded by Reginald Herbert
