= Henry Herbert, 10th Earl of Pembroke =

British military officer, politician and courtier (1734–1794)

General The Right Honourable The Earl of Pembroke
- Portrait by Sir Joshua Reynolds, 1769

Lord of the Bedchamber
- In office 1761–1763
- Monarch: George III
- Preceded by: The Earl of Hyndford
- Succeeded by: The Earl of Pomfret

Personal details
- Born: 3 July 1734
- Died: 26 January 1794 (aged 59)
- Spouse: Lady Elizabeth Spencer
- Children: George Augustus Herbert, 11th Earl of Pembroke, 8th Earl of Montgomery; Charlotte Herbert
- Parent(s): Henry Herbert, 9th Earl of Pembroke; Mary FitzWilliam
- Education: Eton College
- Occupation: Cavalry officer

Military service
- Allegiance: Great Britain
- Branch/service: British Army; British Militia
- Years of service: 1752–1794
- Rank: General
- Unit: 1st Dragoon Guards; 1st Regiment of Foot Guards
- Commands: Wiltshire Militia; 1st Dragoons
- Battles/wars: Seven Years' War

General Henry Herbert, 10th Earl of Pembroke (3 July 1734 – 26 January 1794) was a British military officer, politician and courtier who served as Lord of the Bedchamber from 1761 to 1763. Renowned for his skill in horse training, he became infamous for his affair with Kitty Hunter in 1762, which became a scandal in Georgian England.

== Early life ==
He was the son and heir of Henry Herbert, 9th Earl of Pembroke (1693–1749), of Wilton House, by his wife Mary FitzWilliam, a daughter of Richard FitzWilliam, 5th Viscount FitzWilliam and Frances Shelley. Through this marriage his son inherited the substantial FitzWilliam properties in Dublin and FitzWilliam House at Richmond Green in Surrey, which he renamed "Pembroke House".

== Career ==
c. 1764–1770 portrait of Herbert by David Morier

Herbert was educated at Eton College, and was styled Lord Herbert until he succeeded to his father's earldom in 1749. While waiting on George II at Hanover Herbert was commissioned into the British Army's 1st Dragoon Guards at the rank of cornet on 12 October 1752. He was promoted to captain and made commander of a regimental troop on 2 February 1754.

In 1755 Herbert returned to England and built an indoor riding school at Wilton House and commissioned 55 paintings of military riding exercises which now hang in a smoking room at the house. He married the 19-year-old Lady Elizabeth Spencer, a daughter of Charles Spencer, 3rd Duke of Marlborough, in 1756. Herbert transferred to the 1st Regiment of Foot Guards on 8 September 1756 and became an aide-de-camp to George II on 8 May 1758. In early 1760 he was sent with his regiment to Germany to take part in the Seven Years' War as a major general and commander of the British cavalry brigade in Germany, returning to Britain in 1761.

In 1761 Herbert wrote a military manual on horse riding, Military Equitation: or A Method of Breaking Horses, and Teaching Soldiers to Ride, which had already reached a 4th edition by 1793, and his methods were adopted throughout the British Army's cavalry regiments. As Lord Lieutenant of Wiltshire he was responsible for reforming the Wiltshire Militia and commissioning its officers when it was embodied in 1758. He became colonel of the 1st (Royal) Regiment of Dragoons in 1764. In 1770 the Wiltshire Militia's colonel and several lower-ranking officers resigned in protest at Pembroke's promotion of a junior officer to the vacant lieutenant colonelcy of the militia. In response Pembroke took command of the Wiltshire Militia himself as colonel. He relinquished the colonelcy in 1778 on the eve of the militia's embodiment during the American War of Independence. Herbert was appointed a Lord of the Bedchamber to George III in 1769 and promoted to general in 1782.

== Marriage and children ==
On 23 March 1756 he married the 19-year-old Lady Elizabeth Spencer (January/March 1737–30 April 1831), a daughter of Charles Spencer, 3rd Duke of Marlborough by his wife Elizabeth Trevor. By Elizabeth he had issue as follows:

- George Augustus Herbert, 11th Earl of Pembroke, 8th Earl of Montgomery (1759–1827), son and heir, who married firstly in 1787, Elizabeth Beauclerk and secondly in 1808 Countess Catherine Romanovitch.
- Charlotte Herbert (1773–1784), who died from consumption at age 10.

== Mistresses ==
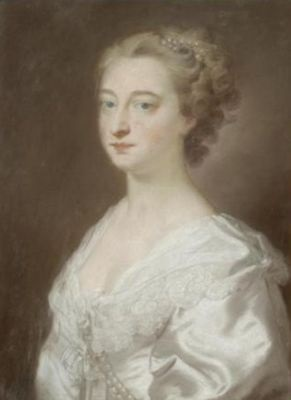
Portrait possibly of Kitty Hunter, Pembroke's mistress, inscribed on the back: For Lord Pembroke at Whitehall; or possibly of Mary FitzWilliam, his mother

He had several mistresses amongst whom were:

- Kitty Hunter, whom he met on his return to England in January 1762, and, disguised as a sailor, eloped with to the Low Countries having left a note for his wife. Horace Walpole commented:

"As Pembroke a horseman by most is accounted
'Tis not strange his Lordship a Hunter has mounted."
On Henry's recall to the Army in Germany, the pregnant Kitty returned to England and on 23 November 1762 gave birth to their child Augustus Retnuh Reebkomp (died 6 February 1797) whose middle name spelt "Hunter" backwards and whose surname was an anagram of "Pembroke". He later adopted the surname "Montgomery". Henry returned to England in February 1763 and was reconciled to his wife in March.

- Second mistress, with whom Henry had another affair in Venice in 1768, apparently carrying the lady off on the very night of her wedding to someone else. She gave birth to their illegitimate child Caroline Medkaff that year or the next.

== Death ==
He died at Wilton at the age of 59.

== Sources ==
- Images of Kitty Hunter
- Henry, Elizabeth and George: Letters and Diaries of Henry, 10th Earl of Pembroke and his Circle (1734–80), 16th Earl, 1939, repub as: The Pembroke Papers vol. I (1734–80), 1942–50.
- The Pembroke Papers vol. II (1780–94), 16th Earl, 1950, [EUL] 9(42073) Pem.
- Col N.C.E. Kenrick, The Story of the Wiltshire Regiment (Duke of Edinburgh's): The 62nd and 99th Foot (1756–1959), the Militia and the Territorials, the Service Battalions and all those others who have served or been affiliated with the Moonrakers, Aldershot: Gale & Polden, 1963.

Political offices
Preceded by The Earl of Hyndford	Lord of the Bedchamber; 1761–1763	Succeeded by The Earl of Pomfret
Military offices
Preceded by Hon. Henry Seymour Conway	Colonel of the 1st (Royal) Regiment of Dragoons; 1764–1794	Succeeded by Philip Goldsworthy
Preceded by Robert Monckton	Governor of Portsmouth; 1782–1794	Succeeded by William Augustus Pitt
Honorary titles
Preceded by Robert Sawyer Herbert	Lord Lieutenant of Wiltshire; 1756–1780	Succeeded by The Earl of Ailesbury
Preceded by The Earl of Ailesbury	Lord Lieutenant of Wiltshire; 1782–1794	Succeeded by The Earl of Pembroke
Peerage of England
Preceded by Henry Herbert	Earl of Pembroke; Earl of Montgomery; 1750–1794	Succeeded by George Herbert
