= Elizabeth Herbert, Baroness Herbert of Lea =

English Roman Catholic writer and philanthropist (1822–1911)

The Right Honourable The Lady Herbert of Lea
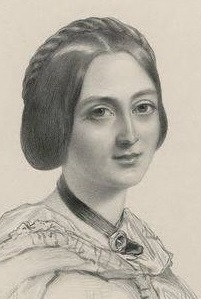
- Born: Mary Elizabeth Ashe à Court-Repington; 21 July 1822; Richmond, Surrey, England
- Died: 30 October 1911 (aged 89); Herbert House, Belgrave Square, London, England
- Occupations: Author and translator
- Spouse: Sidney Herbert (m. 1846; died 1861)
- Children: 7
- Parents: General Charles Ashe à Court-Repington (father); Mary Gibbs (mother)

Mary Elizabeth Herbert, Baroness Herbert of Lea (née Ashe à Court-Repington; 21 July 1822 – 30 October 1911), known simply as Elizabeth Herbert, was an English Roman Catholic writer, translator, philanthropist, and influential social figure.

== Life ==
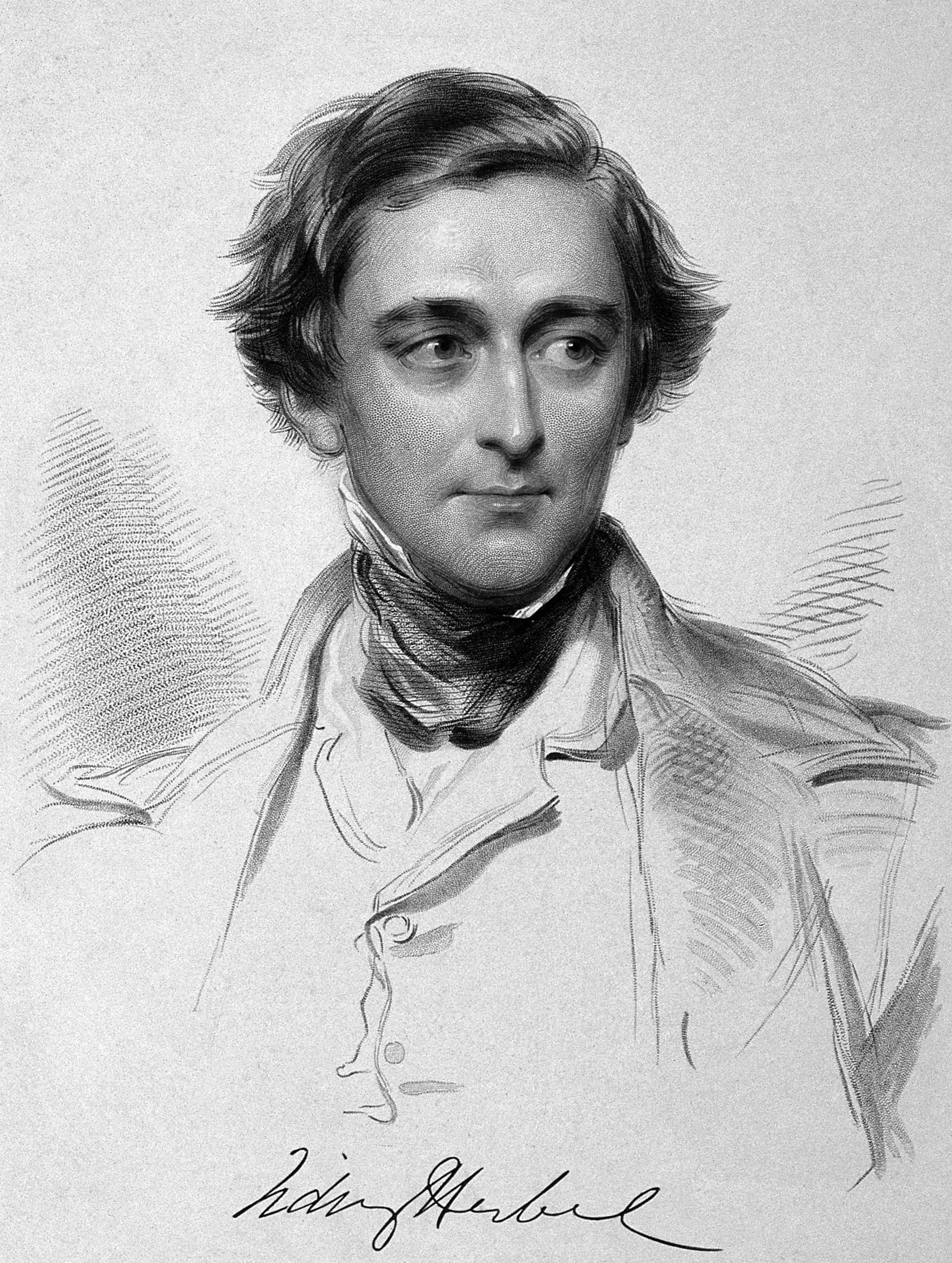
Sidney Herbert

Born in 1822 at Richmond, Surrey, she was the daughter of Mary Elizabeth Gibbs (d. 1878), daughter of a West Indies planter, and Charles Ashe à Court-Repington. In August 1846, aged 24, she married the young politician, Sidney Herbert, second son of the 11th Earl of Pembroke. Herbert is said to have had a five-year affair in the early 1840s, with author and social reformer Caroline Norton, but they separated since she was unable to obtain a divorce. Elizabeth adopted her husband's politics and became a Peelite.

The Herberts first met Florence Nightingale whilst traveling in Italy in 1848. When Sidney was made Secretary at War during the Crimean War, Elizabeth became an ally of Nightingale. They became devoted friends; both Herberts supported Nightingale in her "calling" to become a nurse and serve God.

Sidney Herbert wrote Nightingale to ask her to lead a team of nurses to the Crimean War, Elizabeth Herbert had already sent her own letter to her friend, advising that Sidney wanted to meet with her, adding: "I can only say God guide you aright in your decision. I do feel that if you refuse, you will have lost the most noble opportunity of doing the greatest possible amount of good, just the sort of good which you alone can do".

Elizabeth Herbert assisted in the selection of nurses for the war. Interviews with applicants were held at the Herbert home in Belgrave Square.

In 1861 Sidney Herbert died, shortly after being created Baron Herbert of Lea, leaving her a widow with three daughters and four sons. Lady Herbert of Lea became a Roman Catholic convert at Palermo in 1866, practicing as an "ardent Ultramontane", under the influence of her intimate friend, Cardinal Manning. She would have converted much earlier, but the Herbert family threatened to have her children taken away from her. Only her eldest daughter, Mary, followed her into the Catholic faith; in 1873, Lady Mary married Friedrich von Hügel.

She disliked "of Lea" as an addition to her title, and never used it, becoming known as "Lady Lightning" for her efficiency and ardour working for Catholic charities and interests. She worked in partnership with Cardinal Vaughan for St Joseph's Foreign Missionary College, Mill Hill Park, London, which was opened in 1869. The missionary students at Mill Hill became the focus of her life and work. When she died in London in 1911, she was buried along with Vaughan at Mill Hill, where her tomb bore the simple epitaph, 'The Mother of the Mill'.

== Social figure ==
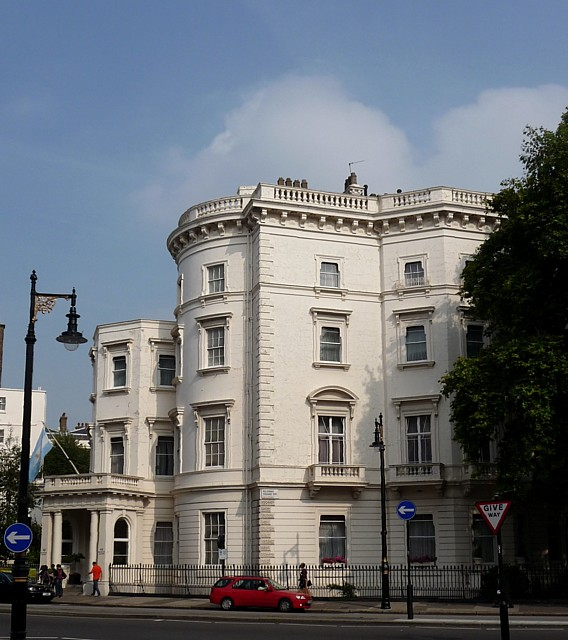
49 Belgrave Square

The Herberts lived at Number 49 in fashionable Belgrave Square, which Baron Herbert named "Belgrave Villa".

Lady Herbert was the intimate friend and correspondent of many eminent Victorians, including politicians, such as Disraeli, Palmerston and Gladstone; reformers, such as Florence Nightingale; and leaders in the Roman Catholic revival, such as Cardinal Newman, Cardinal Vaughan and Cardinal Manning. She figures as Lady Chiselhurst in W.H. Mallock's novel, The Old Order Changes (1886), and as Lady St Jerome in Disraeli's roman à clef, Lothair (1870). Disraeli described her as:

She was the daughter of a Protestant house, but, during a residence at Rome after her marriage, she had reverted to the ancient faith, which she professed with the enthusiastic convictions of a convert. Her whole life was dedicated to the triumph of the Catholic cause; and, being a woman of considerable intelligence and of an ardent mind, she had become a recognised power in the great confederacy which has so much influenced the human race, and which has yet to play perhaps a mighty part in the fortunes of the world.

Lady Herbert was a familiar figure in Rome, which she visited annually until almost the close of her long life.

== Writings ==
- Impressions of Spain in 1866 (Richard Bentley, 1867)
- Cradle Lands (travels in Egypt and Palestine) (1867)
- Wives and Mothers of the Olden Time (1871)
- A Search after Sunshine, or Algeria in 1871 (Bentley, 1872)
- Wayside Tales (1880)
- Edith (autobiographical novel)

Besides these she wrote several stories, some of them autobiographical, articles (many contributed to the Dublin Review), and a number of biographies and biographical essays, mostly of religious figures, which were translated or paraphrased from French originals. The latter included biographies of St. Monica, St. John Baptist de Rossi, Bishop Félix Dupanloup, St. Gabriel of Our Lady of Sorrows, Garcia Moreno, Frédéric-François-Xavier Ghislain de Mérode, Sister Apolline Andreveau DC, etc.:

- Three Phases of Christian Love (St Monica, Mlle Victorine de Galard Terraube, Ven. Mère Devos) (translated, 1866)
- Devin, A., Abyssinia and its Apostle (life of Saint Justin de Jacobis) (London: Burns and Oates, 1867)
- Berthe, P. Augustine, Garcia Moreno, President of Ecuador, 1821–1875, abridged edition translated from the French (London: Burns and Oates, 1889)
- Lagrange, F., Life of Monseigneur Dupanloup: Bishop of Orléans (translated)

== Family ==
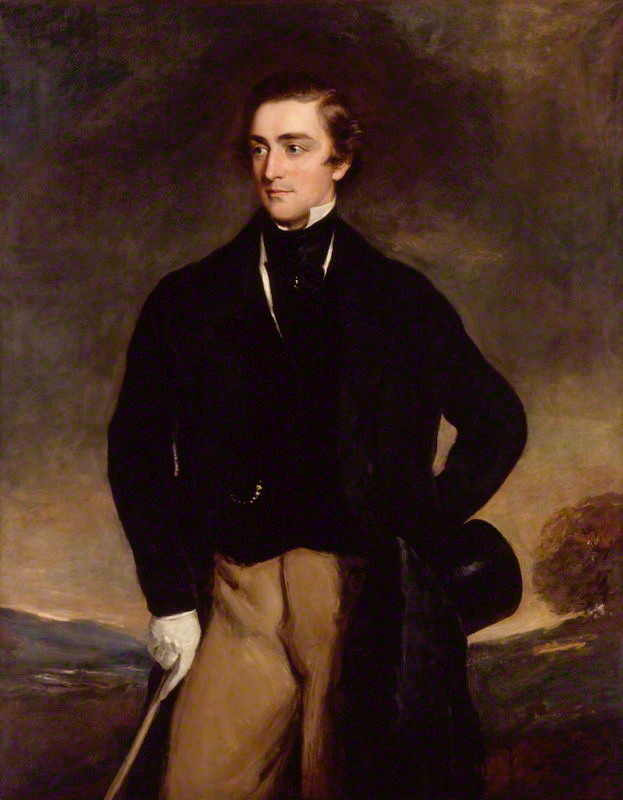
Portrait of Sidney Herbert by Francis Grant, 1847

Lady Herbert of Lea was the only daughter of General Charles Ashe à Court-Repington, who was a member of parliament as well as a soldier, and niece of William à Court, 1st Baron Heytesbury, who was British Ambassador at St. Petersburg. She had seven children by Lord Herbert of Lea:

1. George Robert Charles Herbert (1850–1895), who succeeded in the title and later became the 13th Earl of Pembroke, and the barony is now merged in that earldom.
2. Sidney Herbert (1853–1913), also a member of parliament, who succeeded his brother as the 14th Earl of Pembroke.
3. William Reginald Herbert, b. 12 May 1854; lost at sea on 7 September 1870 aboard HMS Captain.
4. Michael Henry Herbert (The Rt Hon. Sir Michael Herbert) (1857–1904), a diplomat who ended his career as British Ambassador to the United States in Washington, D.C., in succession to Lord Pauncefote, after whom the town of Herbert, Saskatchewan, Canada, is named.
5. Mary Catherine, b. 21 May 1849; m. 27 November 1873 the Roman Catholic modernist theologian, Baron Friedrich von Hügel; and d. 2 December 1935.
6. Elizabeth Maud, b. 30 July 1851; m. 25 June 1872 the composer, Sir Charles Hubert Parry, 1st Baronet (son of Thomas Gambier Parry), of Highnam Court, near Gloucester; and d. 28 February. 1933.
7. Constance Gladwys, patroness of the arts and of the Royal Opera House, b. 24 April 1859; m. 1st 6 July 1878 St. George Henry Lowther, 4th Earl of Lonsdale (d. Feb. 1882) (1 daughter); m. 2ndly 7 May 1885 Frederick Oliver Robinson, the Earl de Grey, later 2nd and last Marquess of Ripon (no issue); she d. 27 October 1917 at 13 Bryanston Square.

== Attribution ==
- The entry cites:
  - Autobiographical details incidentally included in her writings
  - The Tablet (4 and 11 November 1911)
  - Herbert Alfred, Cardinal Vaughan, Letters of Herbert Cardinal Vaughan to Lady Herbert of Lea (London, Burns & Oates, 1942)
  - Sir Tresham Lever, The Herberts of Wilton (Murray, 1967)
