= Charles Herbert (disambiguation) =

Charles Herbert (1948–2015) was an American child actor.

Charles Herbert may also refer to:

- Charles Herbert (MP died ?1557), member of parliament (MP) for Monmouthshire
- Charles Herbert (MP died 1605), MP for Monmouth Boroughs
- Charles Herbert (Royal Navy officer, born 1743) (1743–1816), MP for Wilton
- Charles Herbert (Royal Navy officer, born 1774) (1774–1808), his nephew, MP for Wilton
- Charles Edward Herbert (1860–1929), Australian politician, judge and administrator
