= Sidney Herbert, 1st Baron Herbert of Lea =

British statesman (1810–1861)

The Right Honourable The Lord Herbert of Lea PC
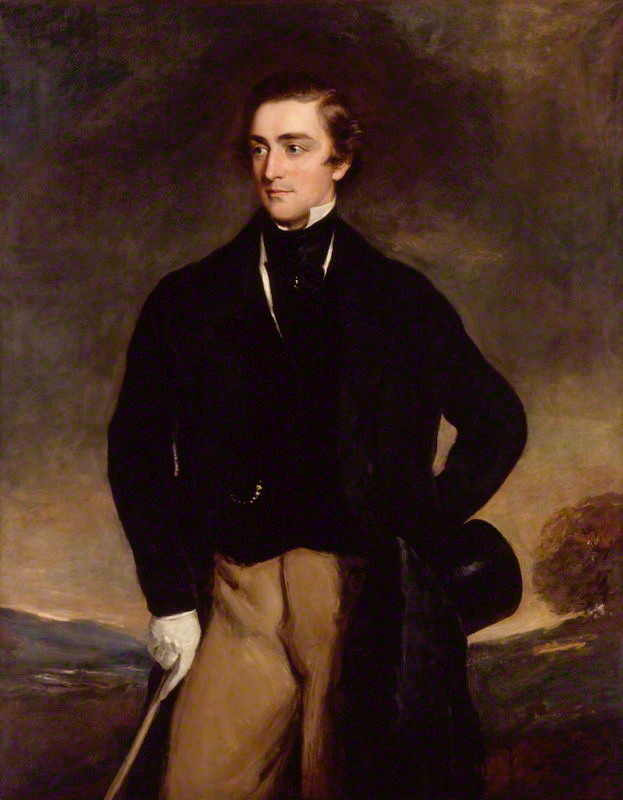
- Portrait of Sidney Herbert by Francis Grant, 1847

Secretary of State for the Colonies
- In office 8 February 1855 – 23 February 1855
- Monarch: Victoria
- Prime Minister: The Viscount Palmerston
- Preceded by: Sir George Grey, Bt
- Succeeded by: Lord John Russell

Secretary of State for War
- In office 18 June 1859 – 22 July 1861
- Monarch: Victoria
- Prime Minister: The Viscount Palmerston
- Preceded by: Jonathan Peel
- Succeeded by: Sir George Cornewall Lewis, Bt

Personal details
- Born: 16 September 1810
- Died: 2 August 1861 (aged 50)
- Party: Conservative; Liberal
- Spouse: Elizabeth à Court-Repington (m. 1846)
- Children: 7
- Parents: George Herbert, 11th Earl of Pembroke (father); Countess Catherine Vorontsov (mother)
- Education: Oriel College, Oxford

Sidney Herbert, 1st Baron Herbert of Lea, PC (16 September 1810 – 2 August 1861) was a British statesman and a close ally and confidant of Florence Nightingale.

== Early life ==
He was the younger son of George Herbert, 11th Earl of Pembroke, his mother being the Russian noblewoman Countess Catherine Woronzow (or Vorontsov), daughter of the Russian ambassador to St James's, Semyon Vorontsov. Woronzow Road in St John's Wood, London, is named after the family. Educated at Harrow and Oriel College, Oxford, he made a reputation at the Oxford Union as a speaker.

== Career ==
Herbert entered the House of Commons as Conservative Member of Parliament for a division of Wiltshire in 1832. Under Robert Peel he held minor offices, and in 1845 was included in the cabinet as Secretary at War. Herbert stayed loyal to Peel and was considered to be a Peelite or a Liberal Conservative. In 1852 he was appointed as Secretary at War in the coalition government of Lord Aberdeen from 1852 to 1854, being responsible for the War Office during the Crimean War. Herbert briefly held office in the first Lord Palmerston ministry in 1855 but resigned when the government agreed to an enquiry into the conduct of the government in the Crimean War. Herbert returned to office again as Secretary at War in 1859, by which time the post had been combined with the office of Secretary of State for War.

Herbert was a member of the Canterbury Association from 20 March 1848.

He ran the Pembroke family estates, centred at Wilton House, Wiltshire, for most of his adult life. His elder half-brother, Robert Herbert, 12th Earl of Pembroke (1791–1862), had chosen to live in exile in Paris after a disastrous marriage in 1814 (annulled 1818) to a Sicilian princess (Ottavia Spinelli di Laurino, Princess of Butera).

Herbert asked his friend Florence Nightingale to lead a team of nurses out to Scutari during the Crimean War, and together he and Nightingale led the movement after the war for Army health and reform of the War Office. The hard work entailed caused a breakdown in his health, so that in July 1861, having been created a baron in the peerage of the United Kingdom, he had to resign government office.

== Personal life ==
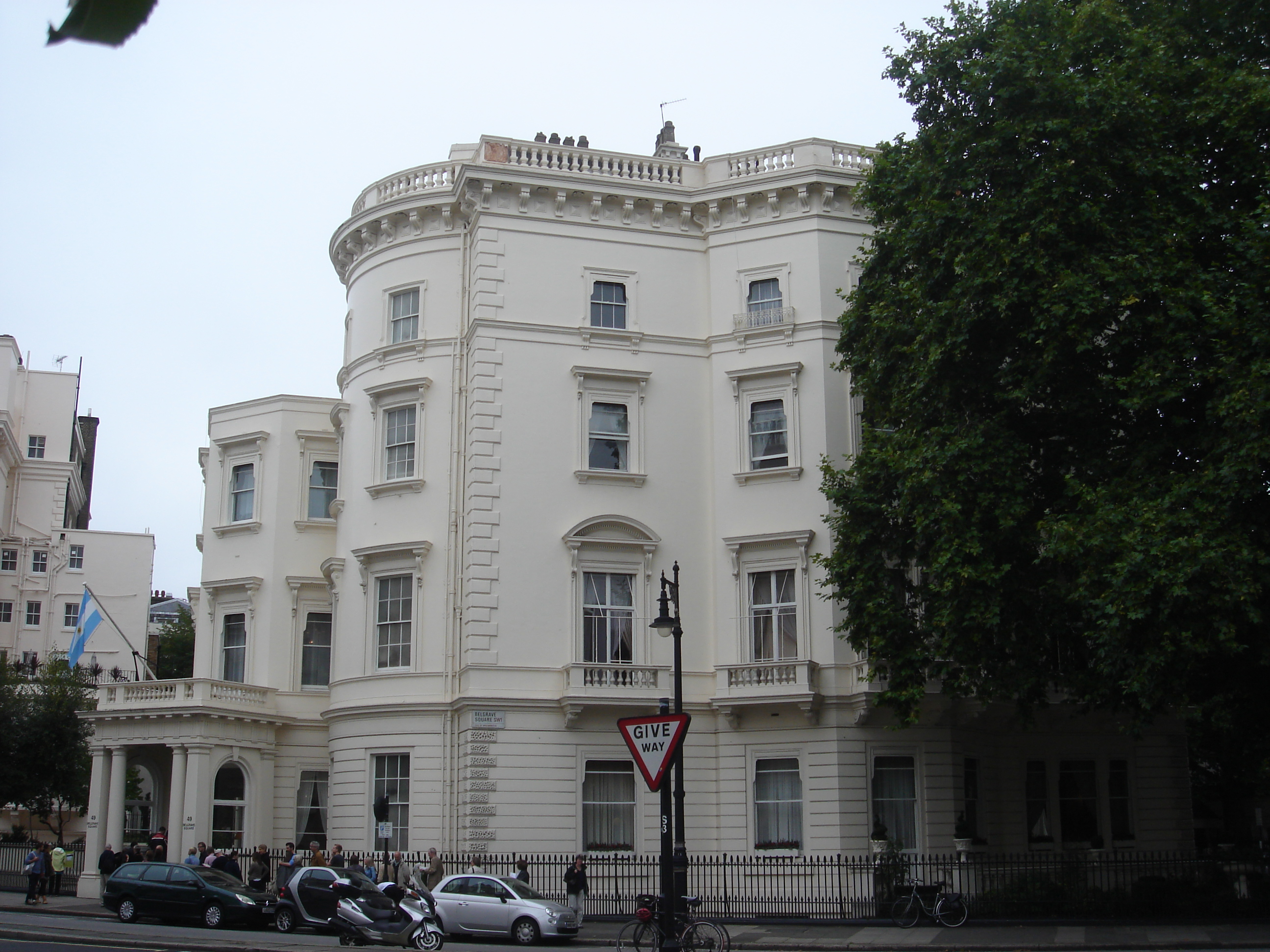
49 Belgrave Square, London, Herbert's home from 1851

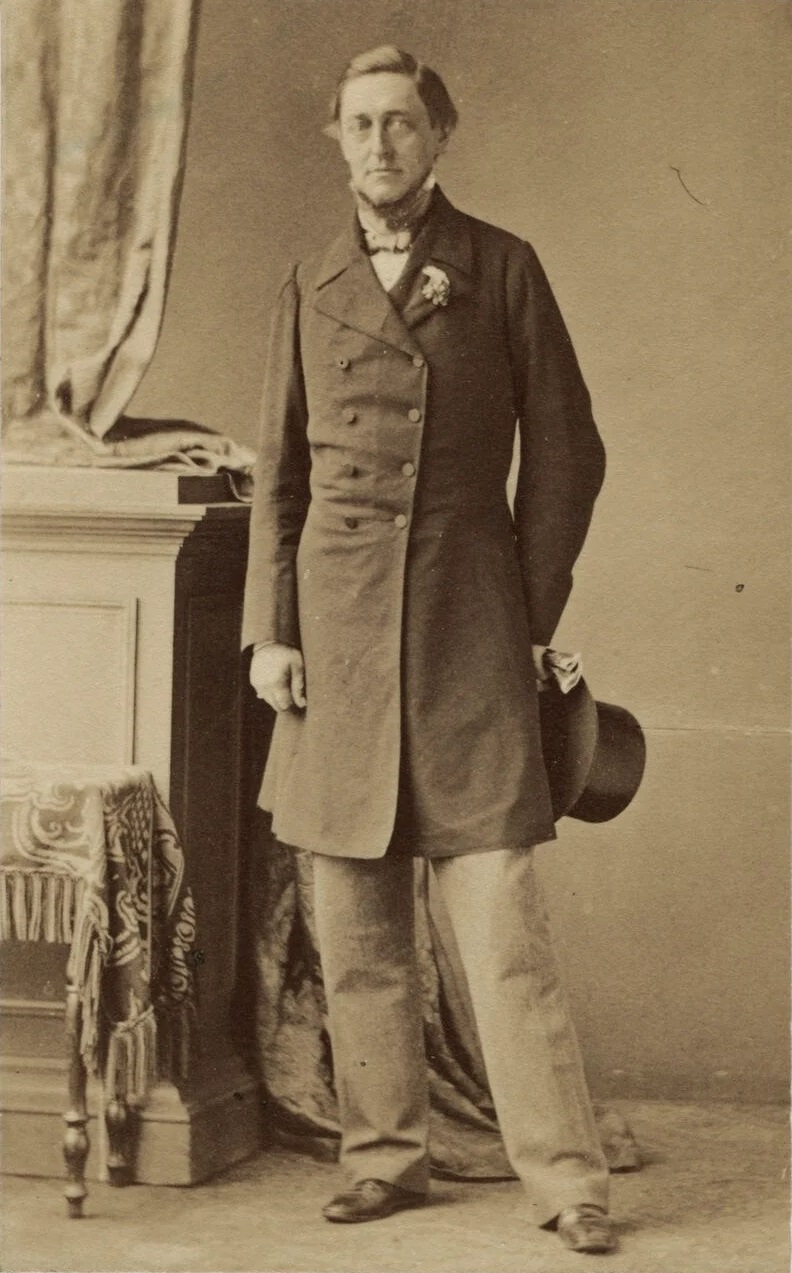
The 1st Baron Herbert of Lea, by Disdéri, c. 1860s

In the early 1840s, Herbert is thought to have had an affair with the noted society beauty and author Caroline Norton, who was unable to get a divorce from an abusive husband, so that the relationship ended in 1846.

In 1846 Herbert married Elizabeth (1822–1911), only daughter of Lt.-Gen. Charles Ashe à Court-Repington and niece of William à Court, 1st Baron Heytesbury. She was a philanthropist, author and translator, and a friend of Benjamin Disraeli, Cardinal Manning and Cardinal Vaughan. After her husband's death, Lady Herbert became an "ardent ultramontane" Roman Catholic, along with their eldest daughter, Mary.

Sidney and Elizabeth Herbert lived at 49 Belgrave Square, London, and had seven children:

1. Mary Catherine Herbert (1849–1935), who married in 1873 the great modernist theologian, Baron (Freiherr) Friedrich von Hügel.
2. George Robert Charles Herbert (1850–1895), who succeeded in the title and later became the 13th Earl of Pembroke; the barony is now merged in that earldom.
3. Elizabeth Maud Herbert (1851–1933), who married in 1872 the composer, Sir Charles Hubert Parry, 1st Baronet (son of Thomas Gambier Parry), of Highnam Court, near Gloucester.
4. Sidney Herbert (1853–1913), also a Member of Parliament, who succeeded his brother as the 14th Earl of Pembroke.
5. William Reginald Herbert (1854–1870), lost at sea aboard HMS Captain, aged 16.
6. Michael Henry Herbert (The Hon. Sir Michael Herbert, KCMG, CB, PC) (1857–1904), after whom the town of Herbert in Saskatchewan, Canada, is named, was a diplomat who ended his career as British Ambassador to the US in Washington DC in succession to Lord Pauncefote. He married in 1888 Lelia "Belle", daughter of Richard Thornton Wilson, a New York banker and cotton broker, and had (with one other son) Sir Sidney Herbert, 1st Baronet.
7. Constance Gwladys Herbert (1859–1917), who married in 1878 St George Henry Lowther, 4th Earl of Lonsdale (issue, 1 daughter) and married secondly in 1885 Frederick Oliver Robinson, the Earl de Grey, later 2nd and last Marquess of Ripon (no issue).

== Death and memorials ==
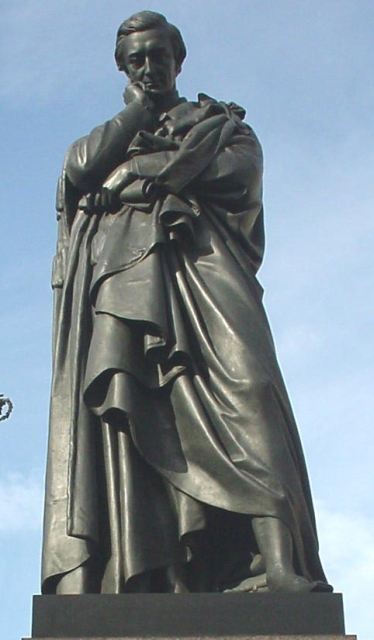
Statue of Lord Herbert of Lea at Waterloo Place, London

Herbert died from Bright's disease shortly after leaving government office, on 2 August 1861. He is buried in the churchyard at Wilton, rebuilt by his father in neo-Romanesque style, with inside the church a marble monumental effigy of him beside Elizabeth, his wife (who, however, was buried at St Joseph's Missionary College, Mill Hill, where she was a notable patron).

His statue by Foley was placed in front of the War Office in Pall Mall, London, and subsequently, following that building's demolition, placed next to A. G. Walker's statue of Florence Nightingale in Waterloo Place, adjacent to the Crimean Monument.

Another statue to him stands in Victoria Park, Salisbury, Wiltshire. There is also a memorial to him on Inchkeith island in the Firth of Forth, which commemorates his advocacy for fortifying the island.

Herbert Sound in the Antarctic and Pembroke, Ontario in Canada are named after Sidney Herbert. In New Zealand, the highest peak on Banks Peninsula was named Mount Herbert by the chief surveyor of the Canterbury Association, Joseph Thomas, in 1849. The Otago surveyor's office renamed the town of Wānaka to Pembroke in 1863.

== Sources ==
- Sir Tresham Lever, The Herberts of Wilton (Murray, 1967)
- Burke's Peerage, 107th edition
- Mark Bostridge, Florence Nightingale. The Woman and Her Legend (Viking, 2008)

Parliament of the United Kingdom
New constituency	Member of Parliament for South Wiltshire; 1832–1861; With: John Benett to 1852; William Wyndham 1852–1859; Lord Henry Thynne from 1859	Succeeded by Frederick Hervey-Bathurst; Lord Henry Thynne
Political offices
Preceded by Robert Gordon; James Alexander Stewart-Mackenzie	Joint Secretary to the Board of Control; 1834–1835	Succeeded by Robert Gordon; Robert Vernon Smith
Preceded by John Parker	First Secretary of the Admiralty; 1841–1845	Succeeded by Hon. Henry Lowry-Corry
Preceded by Sir Thomas Fremantle, Bt	Secretary at War; 1845–1846	Succeeded by Hon. Fox Maule
Preceded by William Beresford	Secretary at War; 1852–1854	Succeeded by The Duke of Newcastle
Preceded by Sir George Grey, Bt	Secretary of State for the Colonies; 1855	Succeeded by Lord John Russell
Preceded by Jonathan Peel	Secretary of State for War; 1859–1861	Succeeded by Sir George Cornewall Lewis, Bt
Peerage of the United Kingdom
New creation	Baron Herbert of Lea; 1861	Succeeded by George Herbert
