= Catherine Herbert, Countess of Pembroke =

Russian noble (1783–1856)

The Right Honourable The Countess of Pembroke and Montgomery
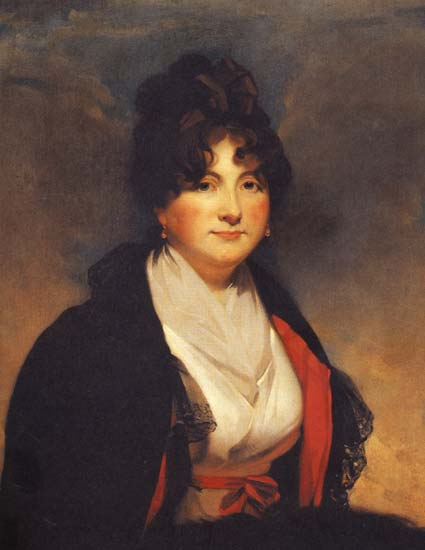
- Portrait of Lady Pembroke, by Sir Henry Raeburn, c. 1810s
- Born: Countess Yekaterina Semyonovna Vorontsova; 24 October 1783; Saint Petersburg, Russia
- Died: 27 March 1856 (aged 72)
- Spouse: George Herbert, 11th Earl of Pembroke (m. 1808; died 1827)
- Children: Elizabeth Meade, Countess of Clanwilliam; Sidney Herbert, 1st Baron Herbert of Lea; Mary Brudenell-Bruce, Marchioness of Ailesbury; Catherine Murray, Countess of Dunmore; Georgiana Petty-Fitzmaurice, Marchioness of Lansdowne; Emma Vesey, Viscountess de Vesci
- Parent(s): Semyon Romanovich Vorontsov (father); Ekaterina Alekseevna Seniavina (mother)
- Relatives: Prince Mikhail Semyonovich Vorontsov (brother)

Catherine Herbert, Countess of Pembroke and Montgomery (born Yekaterina Semyonovna Vorontsova; Russian: Екатерина Семёновна Воронцова; 24 October 1783 – 27 March 1856) was a Russian noblewoman who married the 11th Earl of Pembroke.

== Early life ==
She was born in Saint Petersburg, the daughter of Ekaterina Alekseevna Seniavina and Count Semyon Vorontsov (sometimes spelt Woronzow), the Russian Ambassador in Britain from 1785 to 1806. She was the only sister of Prince Mikhail Vorontsov, Viceroy of New Russia and Caucasus.

She was a niece of Imperial Chancellor Alexander Vorontsov, Elizaveta Vorontsova and Princess Dashkova, a friend of Catherine the Great and a conspirator in the coup d'état that deposed Tsar Peter III and put his wife on the throne.

== Personal life ==
In 1808, she married lieutenant general George Herbert, 11th Earl of Pembroke as his second wife and became Countess of Pembroke, the châtelaine of Wilton House, Wiltshire. From 1807 until his death in 1827, he served as Governor of Guernsey. Together, they were the parents of:

- Lady Elizabeth Herbert (1809–1858), who married Richard Meade, 3rd Earl of Clanwilliam, had issue.
- Sidney Herbert, 1st Baron Herbert of Lea (1810–1861), who married Mary Elizabeth Ashe à Court-Repington, had issue.
- Lady Mary Herbert (1813–1892), who married George Brudenell-Bruce, 2nd Marquess of Ailesbury, no issue.
- Lady Catherine Herbert (1814–1886), who married Alexander Murray, 6th Earl of Dunmore, had issue.
- Lady Georgiana Herbert (1817–1841), who married Henry Petty-Fitzmaurice, 4th Marquess of Lansdowne, no issue.
- Lady Emma Herbert (1819–1884), who married Thomas Vesey, 3rd Viscount de Vesci, had issue.

Lady Pembroke died on 27 March 1856. Upon her husband's death, the earldoms were inherited by his son from his first marriage, Robert Herbert, 12th Earl of Pembroke. On his death without legitimate issue in 1862, the titles passed to Catherine's grandson George Herbert, 13th Earl of Pembroke, and on his death in 1895 to his brother, Sidney Herbert, 14th Earl of Pembroke, whose descendants hold them to this day.
