= Robert Herbert, 12th Earl of Pembroke =

British nobleman and peer (1791–1862)

The Right Honourable The Earl of Pembroke
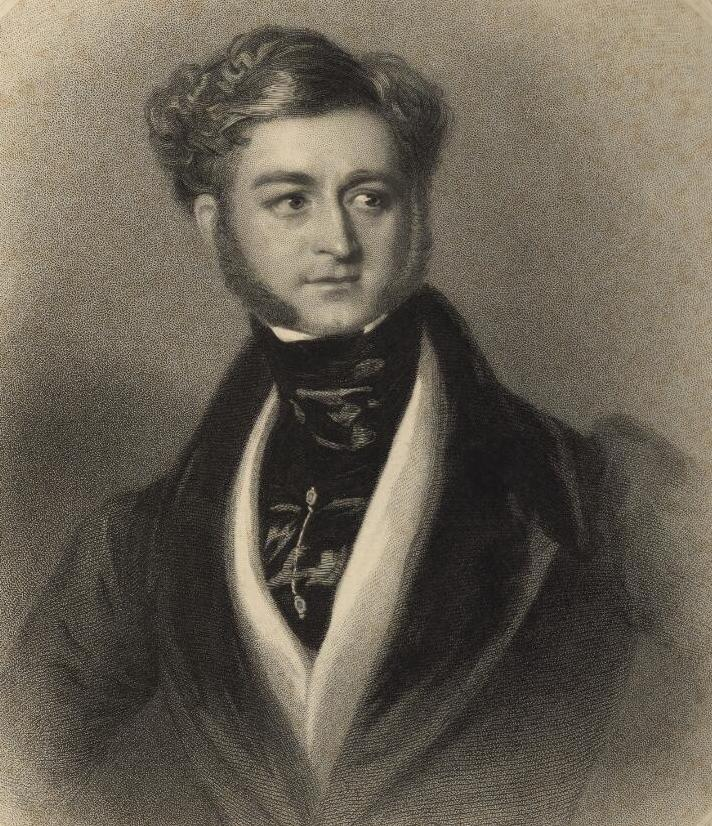
- Stipple engraving of Lord Pembroke, 1837
- Born: 19 September 1791; London, England
- Died: 25 April 1862 (aged 70); Paris, France
- Resting place: Père Lachaise Cemetery; 48.860°N 2.396°E
- Spouse(s): Ottavia Spinelli di Laurino, Princess of Butera (m. 1814, annulled)
- Children: 7
- Parent(s): George Augustus Herbert, 11th Earl of Pembroke (father); Elizabeth Beauclerk (mother)

Robert Henry Herbert, 12th Earl of Pembroke and 9th Earl of Montgomery (19 September 1791 – 25 April 1862) was a British nobleman and peer. He was in line for great estates and position as head of the distinguished Herbert family and heir to the earldom of Pembroke, but lived an irregular life in exile after a dissolute youth.

== Biography ==
=== Early years ===
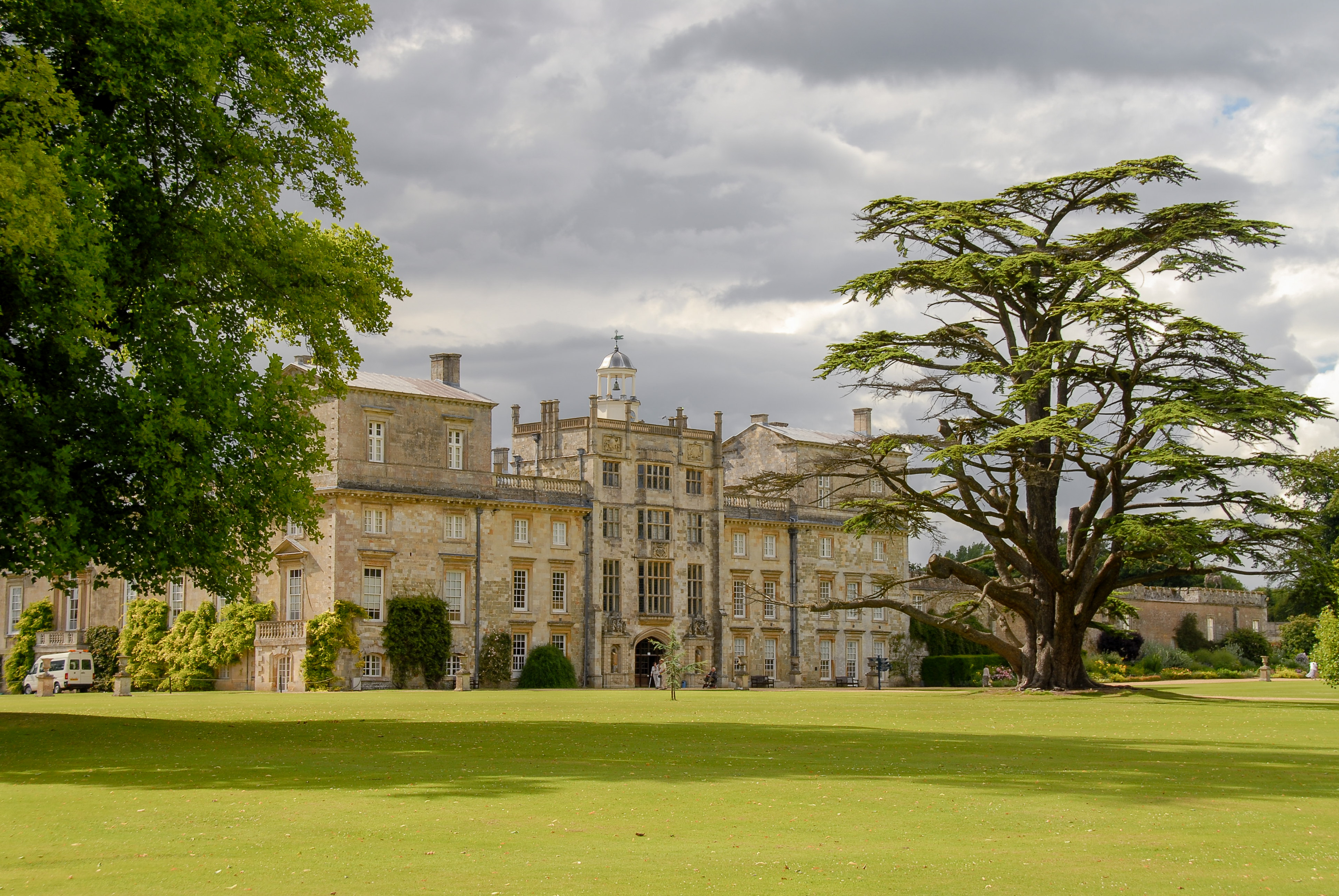
Wilton House

Herbert was born on 19 September 1791 at Hill Street, London, the second (but eldest surviving) son of the 11th Earl of Pembroke by his first marriage to his first cousin, Elizabeth (d. 1793), who was the daughter of Topham Beauclerk and the former Lady Diana Spencer, eldest daughter of Charles Spencer, 3rd Duke of Marlborough, and great-great-granddaughter of Charles II. He spent his childhood at Wilton House, the Pembroke country seat in Wiltshire.

After education at Harrow School, he matriculated at Christ Church, Oxford in 1810. He later travelled to Sicily. Against his father's wishes, Herbert made a disastrous clandestine marriage at the Butera Palace in Palermo on 17 August 1814. His bride was a Sicilian princess, Ottavia Spinelli (1779–1857), the recently widowed wife of the (much older) Prince Ercole Branciforte di Butera, and daughter of the Duke of Laurino.

Before the death of the Prince, the young Viscount Herbert had been the Princess's cavaliere servente. His father attempted to have the marriage dissolved without success, but succeeded in persuading the Sicilian authorities to separate the parties. Accordingly, Lord Herbert was imprisoned in a fortress and his wife in a convent. Herbert managed to escape, however, to Genoa and returned to England, where his father persuaded him to abandon the Princess. She promptly took a house in London under the name of Lady Herbert and brought a suit for restitution of conjugal rights in the English courts in 1819. The marriage was annulled and she was awarded £800 p.a., which it is said was later increased to £5,000, but Lord Herbert and the Princess never came together again. Neither did either ever remarry.

=== Exile ===
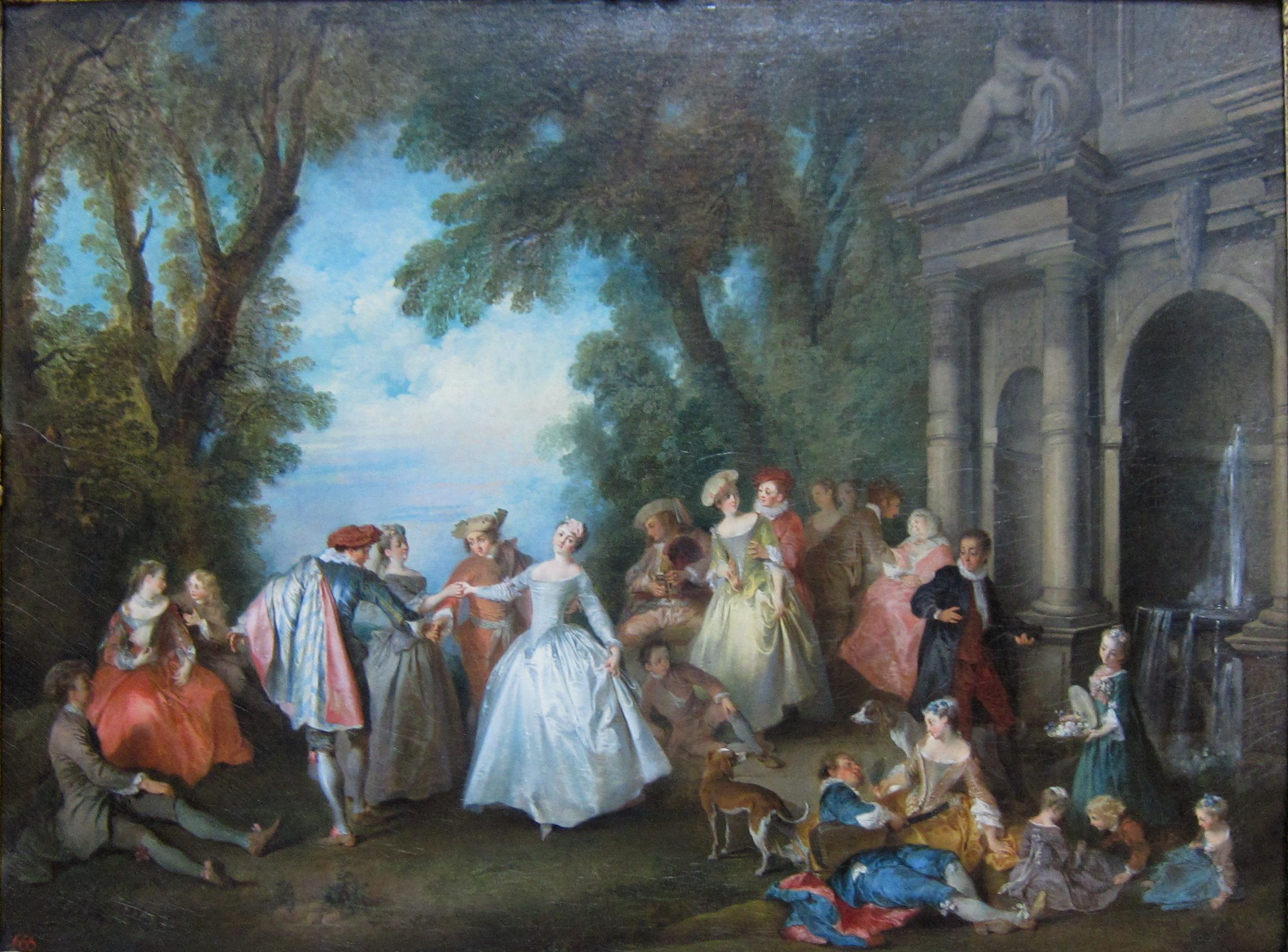
Dance before a Fountain by Nicolas Lancret, Getty Center

Herbert succeeded to the titles on the death of his father in 1827 and took his seat in the House of Lords in 1833. Under a family agreement, his diligent younger half-brother, the statesman Sidney Herbert, 1st Baron Herbert of Lea, took control of managing the family estates centred on Wilton House, Wiltshire.

Subsequently, by 1837 Herbert was living in Paris, where Lord Malmesbury wrote of him, "Lord Pembroke lives in great state in Paris, and is as famous for his cook as for his horses. He is a very handsome man." Herbert owned Lancret's "Dance before a Fountain", previously in the collection of Catherine the Great; it became part of his later estate sale in June 1862. A second painting in his collection was Jean-Baptiste Pater's Réunion dans le pare. He also owned a Garde Temps 18K gold pocket watch purchased in 1832 from Louis Antoine Breguet for 5,000 francs.(The timepiece was sold at auction in 2005 for 74,750 Swiss francs.)

He lived out his exile at No. 19 Place Vendôme, during which time he sired some seven illegitimate children, most of whom adopted the surname 'Montgomery' (as other natural children of the Herbert family had done) or 'de Pembroke de Montgomery'. His frequent trips to London resulted in children by Alexina Sophia Gallot (born London 7 March 1821), daughter of John and Ann Gallot:

1. Robert Henry Granville Montgomery (born c. 1840)
2. Sidney George Granville Montgomery (born c. 1842), who married Catherine Heugh, daughter of Edward Heugh, and had issue
3. Ida Alexina (born 1846)

In Paris, he formed a relationship with ballet dancer Marie Catherine Caroline (Elisa) Schäffer, who bore him:

1. Henriette (30 November 1844 – 1910), who married Amédée, Baron Dubreton (1834–1900) in 1866
2. Henri Georges de Pembroke de Montgomery (17 December 1845 – 29 November 1900), diplomat who married Marie Lucille Adèle Ditte in February 1884; buried in a mausoleum at Chevreuse
3. Adolphus (born 1848)
4. Henriètte Jeanne Montgomery (2 November 1855 – 16 July 1904), who married Louis Janvier de la Motte on 5 May 1877; buried with her eldest brother at Chevreuse

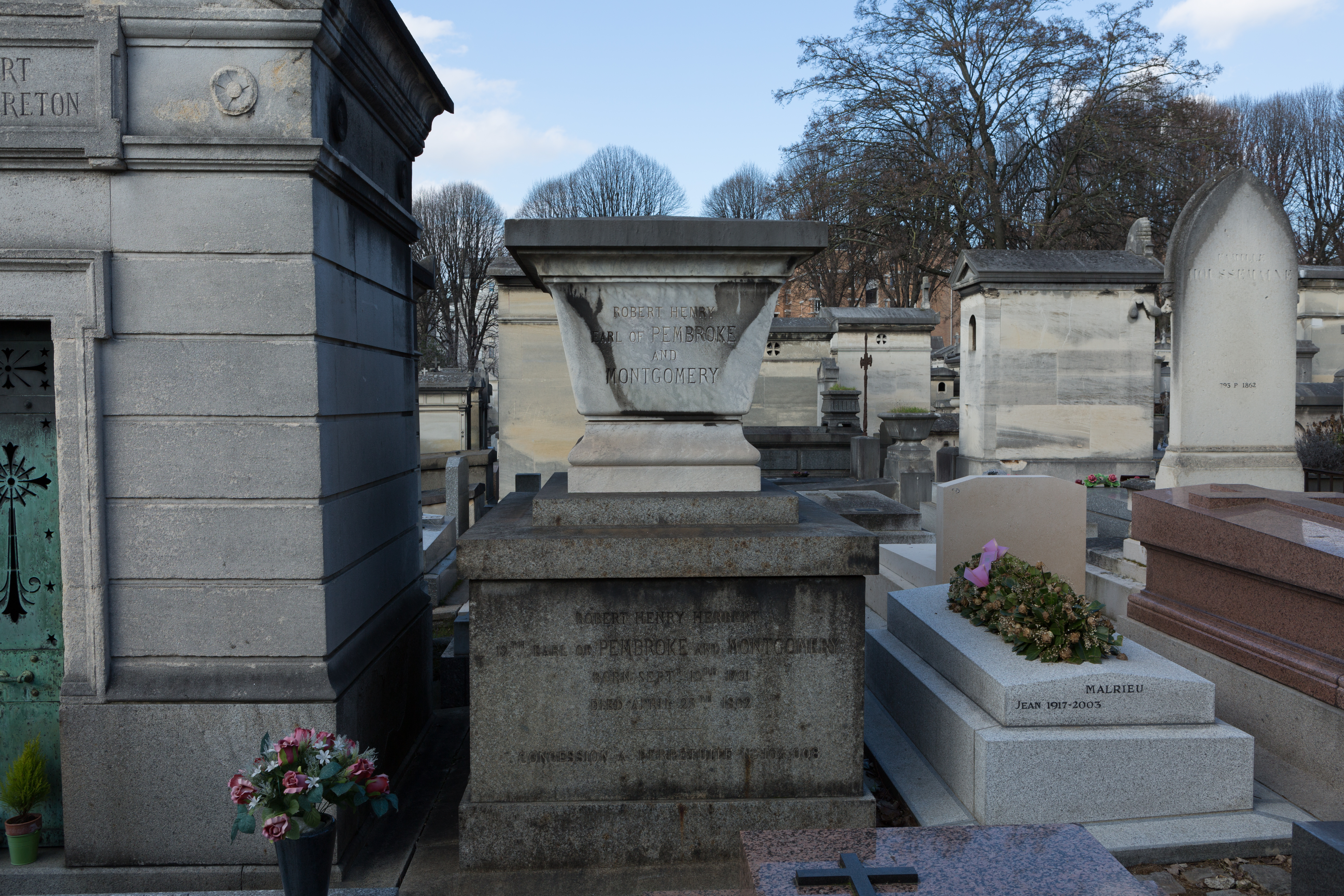
Père-Lachaise Cemetery

He died in Paris 25 April 1862, where he is buried in the Père Lachaise Cemetery. Herbert provided generously for all his children in his will.

=== Succession ===
Herbert was succeeded in his titles by his half-nephew, George Robert Charles Herbert, 13th Earl of Pembroke (1850–1895), who had the previous year succeeded to the barony of Herbert of Lea, so that title merged with the earldom. The 13th Earl's siblings were granted the style and precedence of the younger sons or daughters of an earl by Royal Warrant (on 30 May).

== Sources ==
- Sir Tresham Lever, The Herberts of Wilton (Murray, 1967)
- Cokayne et al., The Complete Peerage
- Phillimore, Cases in Ecclesiastical Courts, vol. 3, pp. 58–66
- Burke's Peerage, 107th edition
- Malmesbury, Memoirs of an ex-Minister, vol. 1, p. 78

Peerage of England
Preceded by George Augustus Herbert	Earl of Pembroke; Earl of Montgomery; 1827–1862	Succeeded by George Robert Herbert
