= Algernon Herbert =

English antiquary (1792–1855)

Algernon Herbert (12 July 1792 – 11 June 1855) was an English antiquary.

== Biography ==
Herbert was the sixth and youngest son of Henry Herbert, 1st Earl of Carnarvon by Elizabeth Alicia Maria, elder daughter of Charles Wyndham, 2nd Earl of Egremont. He was educated at Eton from 1805 onwards, and progressed to Christ Church, Oxford, where he matriculated on 23 October 1810. He went on to study at Exeter College, and graduated B.A. in 1813 and M.A. in 1825. He was elected a fellow of Merton College in 1814; became sub-warden in 1826, and dean in 1828.

On 27 November 1818 he was called to the bar at the Inner Temple.

He married, on 2 August 1830, Marianne, sixth daughter of Thomas Lempriere of La Motte, Jersey; she died on 7 August 1870. They had one son, Sir Robert George Wyndham Herbert, and two daughters. Herbert died in Ickleton, Cambridgeshire. The Dictionary of National Biography described his works as "remarkable" and "replete with abstruse learning", but found that Herbert's "arguments are inconclusive".

== Works ==
His works were:

- Nimrod, a Discourse upon Certain Passages of History and Fable, 1826; reprinted and remodelled in 2 vols., 1828, with a third volume in the same year, and vol. iv in 1829–30. (Google Books: Volume 1, Volume 2, Volume 3, Volume 4)
- An article on "Werewolves", by A. Herbert, pp. 1–45, in The Ancient English Romance of William and the Werwolf (ed. F. Madden, Roxburghe Club, 1832).
- Britannia after the Romans, 1836–41, 2 vols. (Google Books: Volume 1, Volume 2)
- Nennius, the Irish version of the Historia Britonum. Introduction and Notes by A. Herbert, 1848. (Google Books)
- Cyclops Christianus, or the supposed Antiquity of Stonehenge, 1849. (Google Books)
- "On the Poems of the Poor of Lyons", and three other articles in the appendix to J. H. Todd's Books of the Vaudois (1865), pp. 93, 126, 135, 172. (Google Books)

== Sources ==
- This article incorporates text from a publication now in the public domain: "Herbert, Algernon". Dictionary of National Biography. London: Smith, Elder & Co. 1885–1900.
