= George Herbert, 11th Earl of Pembroke =

British Army general (1759–1827)

General The Right Honourable The Earl of Pembroke KG PC
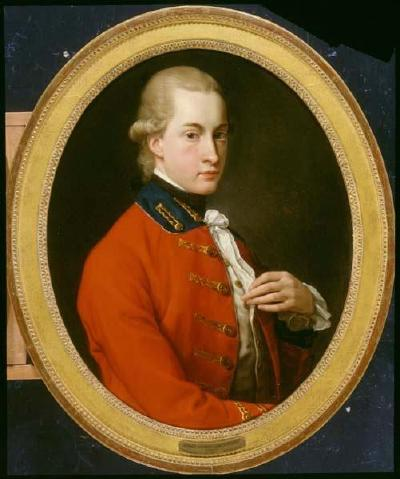

Governor of Guernsey
- In office 1807–1827
- Preceded by: The Earl Grey
- Succeeded by: Sir William Keppel

Member of Parliament for Wilton
- In office 1788–1794
- Preceded by: William Gerard Hamilton; Philip Goldsworthy
- Succeeded by: The Viscount FitzWilliam; Philip Goldsworthy
- In office 1780–1785
- Preceded by: Henry Herbert; Charles Herbert
- Succeeded by: William Gerard Hamilton; Philip Goldsworthy

Personal details
- Born: 10 September 1759 Wilton House, Wilton, Wiltshire, England
- Died: 26 October 1827 (aged 68) Pembroke House, London, England
- Party: Whig
- Spouses: Elizabeth Beauclerk (m. 1787; died 1793) Countess Yekaterina Semyonovna Vorontsova (m. 1808)
- Children: 10, including Robert Herbert, 12th Earl of Pembroke; Sidney Herbert, 1st Baron Herbert of Lea; Catherine Murray, Countess of Dunmore
- Parent(s): Henry Herbert, 10th Earl of Pembroke (father); Lady Elizabeth Spencer (mother)
- Relatives: Charles Spencer, 3rd Duke of Marlborough (maternal grandfather)
- Education: Harrow School

Military service
- Rank: General
- Commands: 2nd and 3rd Dragoon Guards; 6th (Inniskilling) Dragoons
- Battles/wars: French Revolutionary Wars; Siege of Valenciennes

General George Augustus Herbert, 11th Earl of Pembroke and 8th Earl of Montgomery, KG, PC (10 September 1759 – 26 October 1827) was an English peer, army officer, and politician.

== Early life ==
He was born Lord Herbert at the family home, Wilton House in Wilton. He was the only son of Henry Herbert, 10th Earl of Pembroke and 7th Earl of Montgomery and his wife, Elizabeth, the second daughter of Charles Spencer, 3rd Duke of Marlborough. He had a younger sister Charlotte, who died at the age of 10. He was educated at home and then Harrow School from 1770 to 1775. Through his grandmother Mary FitzWilliam, daughter of the 5th Viscount FitzWilliam, he inherited the substantial FitzWilliam estates in Dublin.

== Career ==
After leaving Harrow, Herbert was appointed an ensign in the 12th Regiment of Foot in 1775 and travelled the continent over the next five years, visiting France, Austria, Eastern Europe, Russia and Italy with Rev. William Coxe and Capt. John Floyd.

Herbert was promoted to captain in the 75th Regiment of Foot in 1778, before transferring to 1st The Royal Dragoons later that year. In 1781, he transferred to the 22nd Light Dragoons and the following year was promoted to a lieutenant-colonel in the 2nd Dragoon Guards.

At the start of the French Revolutionary Wars, Herbert saw action in Flanders, where he commanded the 2nd and 3rd Dragoon Guards and liaised with Prussian and Austrian forces. He was also active in the Siege of Valenciennes (1793) and captured an enemy post at Hundssluyt, near Dunkirk, later that year.

=== Political career ===
At the general election of 1780, Herbert became Member of Parliament for the family borough of Wilton and sided with the Whig opposition. He held the seat until 1784 when he was appointed Vice-Chamberlain of the Household and sworn of the Privy Council. He held the seat for Wilton again from 1788 to 1794, the year he inherited his father's titles and estate and also succeeded him as Lord Lieutenant of Wiltshire.

=== Later life ===
In 1795, Pembroke was promoted to a major-general and became colonel of the 6th (Inniskilling) Dragoons in 1797. He was further promoted to lieutenant-general in 1802 and appointed a Knight of the Garter in 1805. After serving as a plenipotentiary on a special mission to Austria in 1807, he was also appointed Governor of Guernsey and finally promoted to a general in 1812.

== Personal life ==
Herbert married twice, firstly on 8 April 1787, to Elizabeth Beauclerk (d. 1793), his first cousin, the daughter of Topham Beauclerk by his wife, Diana. Their children included:

- Hon. George Herbert (1788–1793)
- Lady Diana Herbert (1790–1841), who married Welbore Agar, 2nd Earl of Normanton
- Robert Herbert, 12th Earl of Pembroke (19 September 1791 – 25 April 1862), previously styled Viscount Herbert, who married Ottavia Spinelli di Laurino, Princess of Butera and died without legitimate issue
- Hon. Charles Herbert (1793–1798)

His second marriage was on 25 January 1808 to Countess Catherine Semyonovna Vorontsova, a daughter of the prominent Russian aristocrat and diplomat Semyon Romanovich Vorontsov. The children of the second marriage included:

- Lady Elizabeth Herbert (1809–1858), who married Richard Meade, 3rd Earl of Clanwilliam and had issue
- Sidney Herbert, 1st Baron Herbert of Lea (16 September 1810 – 2 August 1861), who married Elizabeth Ashe à Court-Repington and had issue
- Lady Mary Herbert (1813–1892), who married George Brudenell-Bruce, 2nd Marquess of Ailesbury and died without issue
- Lady Catherine Herbert (31 October 1814 – 12 February 1886), who married Alexander Murray, 6th Earl of Dunmore and had issue
- Lady Georgiana Herbert (1817–1841), who married (as his first wife) Henry Petty-Fitzmaurice, 4th Marquess of Lansdowne and died without issue
- Lady Emma Herbert (1819–1884), who married Thomas Vesey, 3rd Viscount de Vesci and had issue

Lord Pembroke died on 26 October 1827 at his London home, Pembroke House, and was buried at Wilton on 12 November. After having previously quarrelled with his eldest surviving son, Robert, over the latter's marriage to the widowed Italian princess Octavia Spinelli di Laurino, Pembroke left the bulk of his unentailed and personal estate to his only son by his second wife, Sidney (later created Baron Herbert of Lea).

== Notes ==
Parliament of Great Britain
Preceded by Hon. Henry Herbert; Charles Herbert	Member of Parliament for Wilton; 1780–1785; With: William Gerard Hamilton	Succeeded by William Gerard Hamilton; Philip Goldsworthy
Preceded by William Gerard Hamilton; Philip Goldsworthy	Member of Parliament for Wilton; 1788–1794; With: William Gerard Hamilton 1788–1790; The Viscount FitzWilliam 1790–1794	Succeeded by The Viscount FitzWilliam; Philip Goldsworthy
Political offices
Preceded by Viscount Chewton	Vice-Chamberlain of the Household; 1784–1794	Succeeded by Hon. Charles Greville
Military offices
Preceded by James Johnston	Colonel of the 6th (Inniskilling) Regiment of Dragoons; 1797–1827	Succeeded by Sir William Lumley
Preceded by The Earl Grey	Governor of Guernsey; 1807–1827	Succeeded by Sir William Keppel
Honorary titles
Preceded by The Earl of Pembroke	Lord Lieutenant of Wiltshire; 1794–1827	Succeeded by The Marquess of Lansdowne
Peerage of England
Preceded by Henry Herbert	Earl of Pembroke; Earl of Montgomery; 1794–1827	Succeeded by Robert Herbert
