= Lady Emma Herbert =

British circus trapeze artist and stuntwoman

Lady Emma Louise Vickers (née Herbert; born 12 March 1969) is a British circus trapeze artist, stuntwoman, and teacher of circus arts.

== Early life ==
The daughter of Henry Herbert, 17th Earl of Pembroke, a member of the Herbert family, Herbert was brought up at Wilton House in Wiltshire and educated at St Mary's, Calne. The goddaughter of Andrew Parker Bowles, on 4 July 1973 she was a bridesmaid at his wedding to Camilla Shand at the Guards Chapel, Wellington Barracks.

Her mother, Claire (née Pelly), later described her as "very avant garde" and "a bit of a wild child". The Sunday Times said in 2003 that she was "born with rebellion in her blood". Her father, who died in 2003, was a film director and producer, whose work included the movie Emily (1976), starring Koo Stark and partly filmed at the family home, and The Girl with Brains in Her Feet (1997). Her younger brother, William Herbert, is now Earl of Pembroke.

== Later life and career ==
Herbert's parents did not fight her eccentric lifestyle. On leaving school, she went to New York City, where she lived in a Lower East Side house. She later commented "It was straight from A-levels to crack dens, junkies, shootings. I saw lots of very ugly things which made me decide I didn’t want to do them myself." On her return to England, Herbert met a performance art group, Mutoid Waste Company, and one of them became her boyfriend. She learnt acrobatic skills from the Mutoids and toured Europe with them. Other friends at that time included the pop group Sigue Sigue Sputnik and the singer Lemmy, of Motörhead. She became a stuntwoman, getting her first job in Xena: Warrior Princess, and said in an interview, "I whiplashed my spine falling out of a tree, but it was brilliant fun jumping through explosions and coming out of the sea in leather loincloths". She then joined 'Generating Company', also known as 'Genco', a circus theatre group, appearing with them around Europe. In 2002, she performed at the Privilege night-club on the island of Ibiza, better known for its sex shows.

In 2003, The Sunday Times reported on her work as a trapeze artist and acrobat, calling her "one of Britain’s leading exponents... Nobody can question her hard work and bravery" and noting that she was at the cutting edge of modern circus. She then had spiky pink hair, with a black badger streak, and a chin stud. In 2004, she was a trapeze artist at 'Time', a club in Naas, County Kildare, Ireland, where she was reported to be the star attraction.

After spending a year touring New Zealand as lead aerialist in the Weber Bros Circus, Herbert married Robin Vickers in 2005. They have two children. Herbert is a teacher of circus arts at the Performing Arts School of New Zealand, Auckland.
