= Reginald Herbert, 15th Earl of Pembroke =

British peer

Lieutenant Colonel The Right Honourable The Earl of Pembroke MVO JP DL
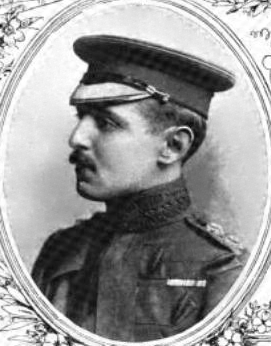
- Born: 8 September 1880; London, England
- Died: 13 January 1960 (aged 79); Wilton, Wiltshire, England
- Education: Eton College; Royal Military College, Sandhurst
- Occupation: Military officer
- Spouse: Beatrice Eleanor Paget (m. 1904)
- Children: Patricia Smith, Viscountess Hambleden; Sidney Herbert, 16th Earl of Pembroke; David Herbert; Anthony Edward George Herbert
- Parents: Sidney Herbert, 14th Earl of Pembroke (father); Lady Beatrix Lambton (mother)

Reginald Herbert, 15th Earl of Pembroke and 12th Earl of Montgomery (8 September 1880 – 13 January 1960), styled Lord Herbert from 1895 to 1913, was a British Army officer and peer from the Herbert family.

== Early life and education ==
Herbert was born at Herbert House, Belgrave Square, the eldest son of Sidney Herbert, 14th Earl of Pembroke and Lady Beatrix Louisa Lambton, daughter of George Lambton, 2nd Earl of Durham. He was of Anglo-Welsh descent and also descended from a Russian aristocratic family, the Vorontsovs, through the marriage of the 11th Earl of Pembroke and his second wife, Catherine Vorontsov. Catherine's father, Count Semyon Vorontsov, the Imperial Russian ambassador to Britain, brought the family to London in 1785.

He was educated at Eton and Sandhurst.

== Career ==
In 1899, Herbert was gazetted second lieutenant in the Royal Horse Guards. He was appointed Member of the Royal Victorian Order (5th Class) in 1901. He served as aide de camp to Sir Arthur Paget in 1912–13, when Paget was Commander-in-Chief, Ireland; and to Sir William Pulteney in 1914.

He served during the First World War and was mentioned in dispatches. He continued to serve as ADC to Pulteney, who was General officer commanding III Corps. In 1918, he accompanied Prince Arthur of Connaught to Japan to present Emperor Yoshihito with the baton of field-marshal.

Herbert was awarded an Officer of the Order of the Crown of Italy, the French Legion of Honour, and the Japanese Order of the Rising Sun (3rd class) and Order of the Sacred Treasure (3rd class). He was appointed Member of the Royal Victorian Order (4th Class) in 1918. In 1919, he retired from the Army, with the rank of lieutenant-colonel.

In 1921, the Earl and Countess visited Tangier with their daughter Lady Patricia, and toured the city with the artist John Lavery. Lavery was subsequently invited to Wilton House, where he painted the Van Dyck Room and the Palladian Bridge.

Lord Pembroke was twice mayor of Wilton, Wiltshire. He was a hereditary visitor at Jesus College, Oxford.

During the Second World War, he worked at the Foreign Office, in which capacity he was the addressee of an often-reproduced humorous note sent by Sir Archibald Clark Kerr, who was British Ambassador to Moscow.

== Marriage and issue ==
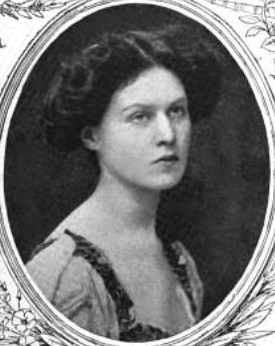
Beatrice Eleanor Paget

On 21 January 1904, Herbert married Lady Beatrice Eleanor Paget, daughter of Lord Alexander Victor Paget, younger son of the 2nd Marquess of Anglesey. They had four children:

- Lady Patricia Herbert (12 November 1904 – 19 March 1994), Lady of the Bedchamber to Queen Elizabeth from 1937 to 1994
- Sidney, Lord Herbert (9 January 1906 – 16 March 1969), succeeded his father
- The Hon. David Herbert (3 October 1908 – 3 April 1995), author
- Lt.-Col Hon. Anthony Edward George Herbert (12 September 1911 – 22 August 1971), died unmarried

Pembroke died at his seat, Wilton House, in Wiltshire. He was succeeded in his titles and estates by his eldest son.

Peerage of England
| Preceded by Sidney Herbert | Earl of Pembroke; Earl of Montgomery; 1913–1960 | Succeeded by Sidney Herbert |
