= Isaac de Caus =

French architect and engineer

- Born: 1590; Dieppe
- Died: 1648 (aged 57–58); Paris
- Occupation: Architect
- Buildings: Wilton House

Isaac de Caus (1590–1648) was a French landscaper and architect. He arrived in England in 1612 to carry on the work that his brother Salomon de Caus had left behind. His first known work in England was a grotto that Caus designed in 1623 located in the basement of Inigo Jones's Banqueting House. He is noted for his work at Wilton House and Lincoln's Inn.

He was the architect in charge of carrying out Inigo Jones's design for Covent Garden.

Documented clients include Mary, Countess of Home at her London townhouse in Aldersgate. Surviving buildings include the stables at Wilton House, designed in 1630s closely following an elevation published by Sebastiano Serlio.
