= Earl of Pembroke =

Title in the Peerage of England

Earldom of Pembroke held with Earldom of Montgomery
- Arms of Herbert: Per pale azure and gules, three lions rampant argent
- Creation date: 1138 (first creation); 1199 (second creation); 1247 (third creation); 1339 (fourth creation); 1414 (fifth creation); 1447 (sixth creation); 1452 (seventh creation); 1468 (eighth creation); 1479 (ninth creation); 1551 (tenth creation)
- Created by: Stephen, King of England
- Peerage: Peerage of England
- First holder: Gilbert de Clare, 1st Earl of Pembroke
- Present holder: William Herbert, 18th Earl of Pembroke (10th creation)
- Heir apparent: Reginald Henry Michael Herbert, Lord Herbert
- Remainder to: the male heirs of the body lawfully begotten
- Subsidiary titles: Earl of Montgomery; Baron Herbert of Cardiff; Baron Herbert of Shurland; Baron Herbert of Lea (1861)
- Seat: Wilton House
- Former seat: Pembroke Castle
- Motto: Ung je serviray ("One will I serve")

Earl of Pembroke is a title in the Peerage of England that was first created in the 12th century by Stephen, King of England. The title, which is associated with Pembroke, Pembrokeshire in West Wales, has been recreated ten times from its original inception. Due to the number of creations of the Earldom, the original seat of Pembroke Castle is no longer attached to the title. As of 2018, the current holder of the earldom is William Herbert, 18th Earl of Pembroke, which is the 10th creation of the title. For the past 400 years, his family's seat has been Wilton House, Wiltshire. The Earls of Pembroke also hold the title Earl of Montgomery, created for the younger son of Henry Herbert, 2nd Earl of Pembroke before he succeeded as the 4th Earl in 1630. The current Earls of Pembroke also carry the subsidiary titles: Baron Herbert of Cardiff, of Cardiff in the County of Glamorgan (1551), Baron Herbert of Shurland, of Shurland in the Isle of Sheppey in the County of Kent (1605), and Baron Herbert of Lea, of Lea in the County of Wilts (1861). All are in the Peerage of England except the Barony of Herbert of Lea, which is in the Peerage of the United Kingdom.

The Earl of Pembroke is the hereditary visitor of Jesus College, Oxford.

On 1 September 1532, King Henry VIII created the original Marquessate of Pembroke for his future queen Anne Boleyn. This honour was in recognition of the king's great-uncle Jasper Tudor, who had been the Earl of Pembroke in the 15th century, and his own father, Henry VII, who was born at Pembroke Castle in January 1457.

== History ==
=== Arnulf de Montgomery ===
The title of Earl of Pembroke has been held successively by several English families, the jurisdiction and dignity being originally attached to the county palatine of Pembrokeshire. William Rufus may have invested Arnulf de Montgomery with the Earldom of Pembroke in the late 11th century as a reward for the construction of Pembroke Castle.

=== The first creation: de Clare (1138) ===
- Gilbert de Clare, 1st Earl of Pembroke (1100–1147)
- Richard de Clare, 2nd Earl of Pembroke (1130–1176)
- Gilbert de Clare, 3rd Earl of Pembroke (1173–1185)
- Isabel de Clare, 4th Countess of Pembroke (1172–1220)

The first definite creation came decades later in 1138. Two years previously Welsh forces had severely defeated Norman forces and in partial reaction in 1138 Pembrokeshire became a county palatine with King Stephen creating Gilbert de Clare, as an earl. Gilbert was already Lord of Striguil (modern Chepstow) who was married to Isabel de Beaumont, Henry I's former mistress.

His son Richard (commonly known as Strongbow) also supported Stephen and so was treated with suspicion by Matilda's son, Henry II, who on Gilbert's death in 1148 seems to have to refused to recognise Richard's claims to the earldom of Pembroke although his claim to the lesser lordship of Striguil does not seem to have been challenged.

Being effectively disinherited by the king (for the first but not the last time in his life) and with mounting debts, Richard welcomed the opportunity to restore his fortunes that presented itself in 1168. In that year, he was chosen to lead a Norman expedition to Ireland in support of Diarmait Mac Murchada, the deposed King of Leinster. The Lord of Striguil crossed over in person in 1170, took both Waterford and Dublin, and was married to Diarmuid's daughter, Aoife MacMurrough, claiming the Kingship of Leinster after Diarmuid's death in 1171. Henry II, wary of his power, stripped Strongbow of his new holdings the same year and invaded Ireland himself in 1171, putting his people in power. Strongbow returned to favour and power in Ireland, in 1173 when he aided the King in his campaign against his rebelling sons. He died in 1176 after years of bitter struggle with Irish magnates.

Strongbow died with male issue - Gilbert. However, Gilbert, being a minor, was not formally invested with either the earldom of Pembroke or of Striguil. It is unlikely that his father could have passed on the title to Pembroke as he himself did not possess it. When Gilbert died in 1185, his sister Isabel de Clare became Countess of Pembroke in her own right (suo jure) until her death in 1220. In this way, she could be said to be the first successor to the earldom of Pembroke since her grandfather Gilbert, the first earl. By this reckoning, Isabel ought to be called the second countess, not the fourth countess of Pembroke.

In any event, the title Earl was re-created for her husband as her consort, the famous Sir William Marshal, son of John the Marshal, by Sibylle, the sister of Patrick, Earl of Salisbury.

=== The second creation: Marshal (1199) ===
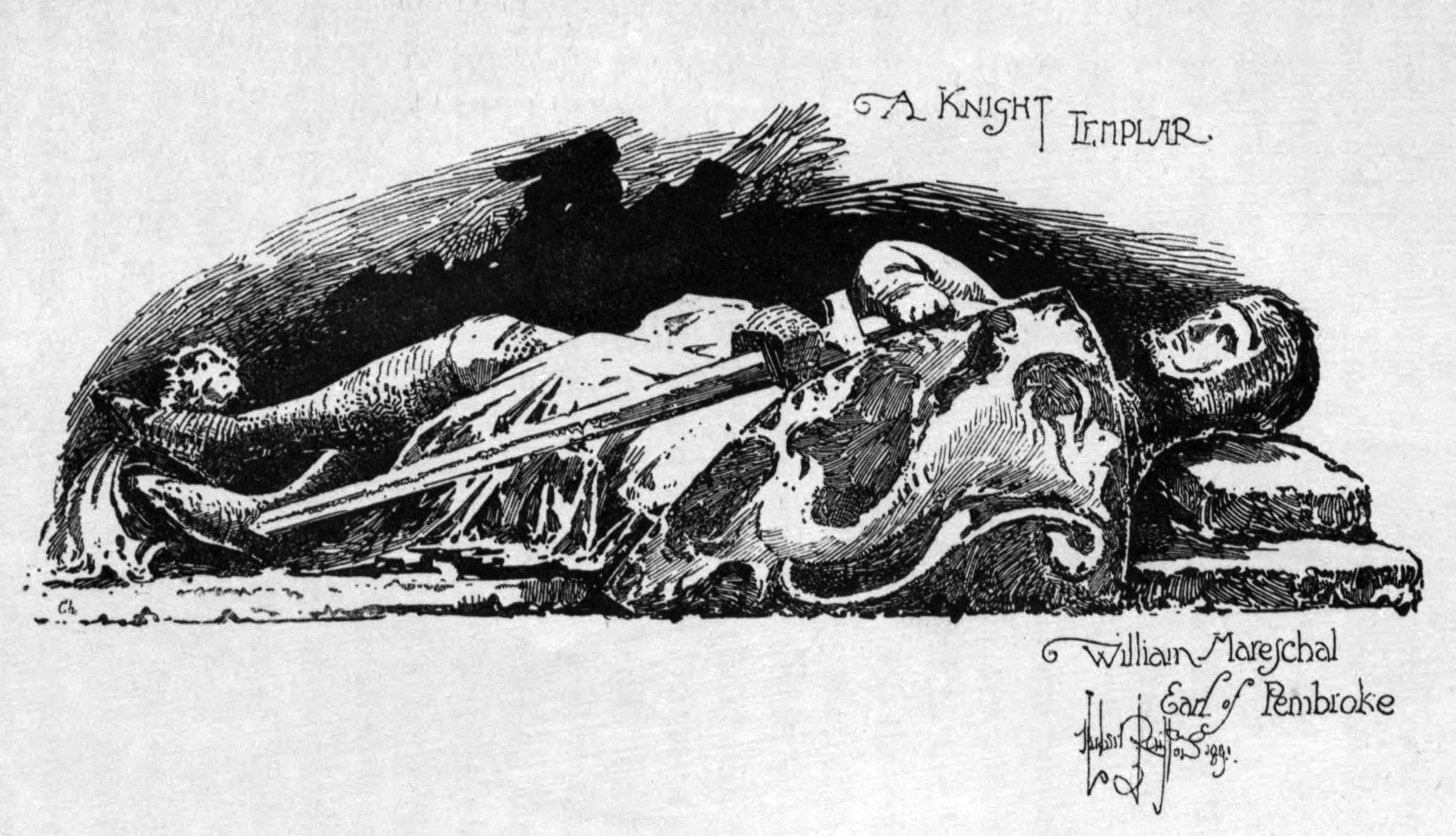
Herbert Railton's illustration of the Earl of Pembroke's tomb in the Temple Church in London

- William Marshal, 1st Earl of Pembroke (1146–1219)
- William Marshal, 2nd Earl of Pembroke (1190–1231)
- Richard Marshal, 3rd Earl of Pembroke (c. 1191 – 1234)
- Gilbert Marshal, 4th Earl of Pembroke (died 1241)
- Walter Marshal, 5th Earl of Pembroke (c. 1199 – 1245)
- Ansel Marshal, 6th Earl of Pembroke (died 1245)

In August 1189, at the age of 43, William Marshal, held by many to be the greatest knight in Christendom, was given the hand of Isabel de Clare, and, in 1199, was created the 1st Earl of Pembroke by King John. Although he had previously served Richard's father, Henry II, against Richard's rebellions, Richard confirmed the old King's licence for his marriage with the heiress of Strigul and Pembroke. He served Richard I and John loyally, defending the latter against the French and English rebel barons in the First Barons' War. He was present at the signing of Magna Carta in 1215. Upon John's death in 1216, the seventy-year-old Marshal was named Regent of the kingdom and protector of the young King, Henry III. He defeated the rebels and their French allies, and reissued Magna Carta in order to secure the peace. He fell ill early in 1219, and died on 14 May at his manor of Caversham near Reading. He was succeeded in the regency by Hubert de Burgh, and in his Earldom by his five sons in succession.

Marshal's eldest son, William Marshal (died 1231), 2nd Earl of Pembroke of this line, passed some years in warfare in Wales and Ireland, where he was justiciar from 1224 to 1226; he also served Henry III in France. His second wife was the King's sister, Eleanor, who later married Simon de Montfort, but he left no children.

His brother Richard Marshal (died 1234), 3rd Earl, came to the fore as the leader of the baronial party, and chief antagonist of the foreign friends of Henry III. Fearing treachery, he refused to visit the King at Gloucester in August 1233, and Henry declared him a traitor. He crossed to Ireland, where Peter des Roches had instigated his enemies to attack him, and in April 1234, he was overpowered and wounded, and died a prisoner.

His brother Gilbert (d. 1241), who became the 4th Earl, was a friend and ally of Earl Richard of Cornwall. When another brother, Ansel, the 6th Earl, died in December 1245, the male descendants of the great Earl Marshal became extinct. The extensive family possessions were now divided among Ansel's five sisters and their descendants, the Earldom of Pembroke reverting to the Crown.

=== The third creation: de Valence (1247) ===
- William de Valence, 1st Earl of Pembroke (c. 1225 – 1296)
- Aymer de Valence, 2nd Earl of Pembroke (c. 1275 – 1324) (extinct)

The next holder of the lands of the Earldom of Pembroke was William de Valence, a younger son of Hugh de Lusignan, count of La Marche, by his marriage with Isabella of Angoulême, widow of the English King John. In 1247, William, along with two of his brothers, moved from France to England, where their half-brother, Henry III was King. The King married William to Joan de Munchensi (d. 1307), a granddaughter and heiress to the great William Marshal, 1st Earl of Pembroke. Valence was granted custody of the lands, and the title of Earl of Pembroke, giving him great wealth and power in his new land. As a result, he was unpopular, and was heavily involved in the Second Barons' War, supporting the King and Prince Edward against the rebels led by Simon de Montfort. After the final defeat of the rebels at the Battle of Evesham in 1265, William continued to serve Henry III, and then Edward I, until his death in 1296.

William's eldest surviving son, Aymer (c. 1275 – 1324), succeeded to his father's estates, but was not formally recognized as Earl of Pembroke until after the death of his mother Joan in 1307. He was appointed guardian of Scotland in 1306, but with the accession of Edward II to the throne and the consequent rise of Piers Gaveston to power, his influence declined. He became prominent among the discontented nobles, but in 1312, after the Earl of Warwick betrayed him by executing the captured Gaveston, he left the allied lords and joined the King. Valence was present at Bannockburn in 1314, and later helped King Edward defeat Thomas of Lancaster. However, by his death in 1324, he was again marginalized at court, and in financial trouble as well. His wife, Marie de St Pol, a descendant of King Henry III, was the founder of Pembroke College, Cambridge.

=== The fourth creation (1339): Hastings ===
- Laurence Hastings, 1st Earl of Pembroke (1319–1348)
- John Hastings, 2nd Earl of Pembroke (1347–1375)
- John Hastings, 3rd Earl of Pembroke (1372–1389) (extinct)

Lawrence, a great-grandson of William de Valence was created, or recognized as, Earl of Pembroke, having inherited (through the female line) a portion of the estates of the Valence Earls of Pembroke. His son John (died 1376) married Margaret, daughter of King Edward III, and on the death without issue of his grandson in 1389, the Earldom of Pembroke reverted again to the Crown.

=== The fifth creation (1414): Plantagenet ===
- Humphrey, Duke of Gloucester (1390–1447) (extinct)

Humphrey, the fourth son of King Henry IV, was created Duke of Gloucester and Earl of Pembroke for life, these titles being subsequently made hereditary, with a reversion as regards the Earldom of Pembroke, in default of heirs to Humphrey, to William de la Pole, 1st Duke of Suffolk.

=== The sixth creation (1447): de la Pole ===
- William de la Pole, 1st Duke of Suffolk (1396–1450) (extinct)

On the death of Humphrey without legitimate issue in 1447, William de la Pole became Earl of Pembroke. He was beheaded in 1450 and his titles were forfeited.

=== The seventh creation (1452): Tudor ===
- Jasper Tudor, 1st Duke of Bedford (c. 1431–1495) (forfeit 1461; restored 1485) (extinct)

Sir Jasper Tudor was the half-brother of King Henry VI. Being a Lancastrian, his title was forfeited for 24 years during the predominance of the House of York.

=== The eighth creation (1468): Herbert ===
- William Herbert, 1st Earl of Pembroke (1423–1469)
- William Herbert, 2nd Earl of Pembroke (died 1491) (surrendered 1479)

Following Jasper Tudor's attainder, Sir William Herbert, a zealous Yorkist, was raised to the peerage as Baron Herbert by Edward IV. Herbert defeated the Lancastrian Jasper Tudor and captured Harlech Castle during the Wars of the Roses. For this service, he was created Earl of Pembroke in 1468. Perhaps mindful of its earlier Tudor holder, the second earl surrendered his title to Edward IV ten years after acceding and received, in lieu, the Earldom of Huntingdon.

The grandson of William Herbert, 1st Earl of Pembroke was newly created Earl of Pembroke in 1551 and the current Earl is a descendant of this house.

=== The ninth creation (1479): York ===
- Edward Plantagenet (1470–1483) (merged into crown 1483)

In 1479, Edward IV conferred the title on his son, Edward, Prince of Wales. When this prince succeeded to the throne as Edward V of England, the Earldom of Pembroke merged with the crown. Following the defeat of the House of York, the earldom (and kingdom) were restored to the Tudors with the accession of Henry VII.

=== Marquess of Pembroke (1532): Anne Boleyn ===
- Anne Boleyn, (1501/7–1536)

On 1 September 1532, a few months prior to her marriage to Henry VIII, Anne was granted the Marquessate of Pembroke; she was found guilty of treason and executed in May 1536, at which point the title became either forfeit or extinct at her death without male children.

=== The tenth creation (1551): Herbert ===
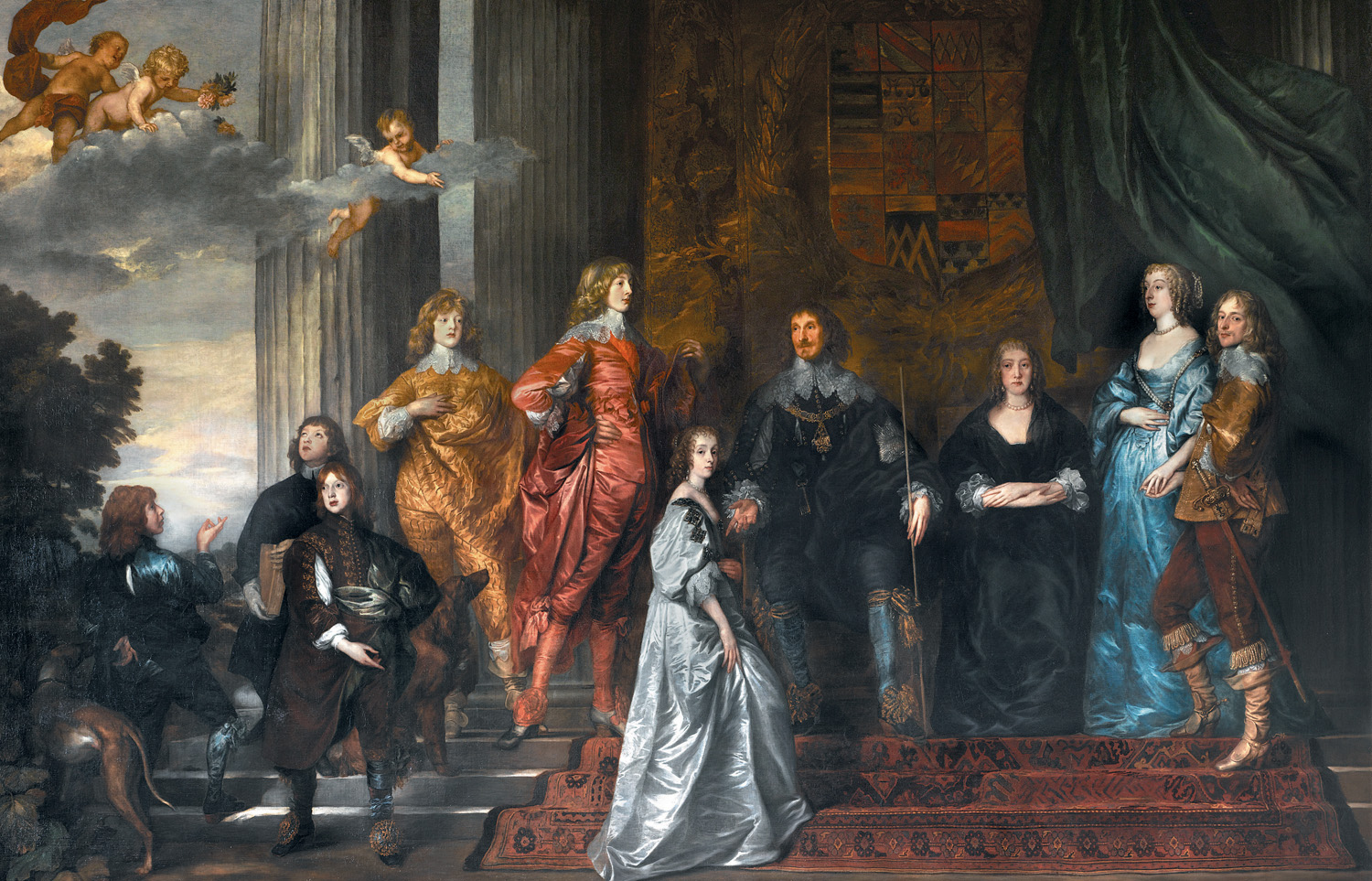
Philip Herbert, 4th Earl of Pembroke and his second wife, Lady Anne Clifford, and his Family by Van Dyck. (Wilton House)

The title was next revived in favour of Sir William Herbert, whose father, Richard, was an illegitimate son of the 1st Earl of Pembroke of the house of Herbert. He had married Anne Parr, sister of Henry VIII's sixth wife, Catherine Parr, and was created Earl in 1551. The title has since been held by their descendants.

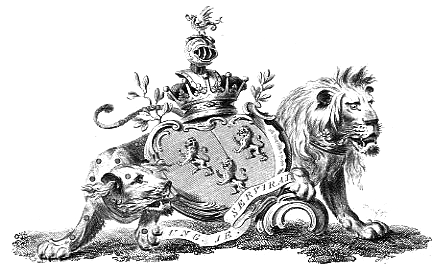
Arms of the Earls of Pembroke (tenth creation)

- William Herbert, 1st Earl of Pembroke (1501–1570)
- Henry Herbert, 2nd Earl of Pembroke (1534–1601)
- William Herbert, 3rd Earl of Pembroke (1580–1630)
- Philip Herbert, 4th Earl of Pembroke, 1st Earl of Montgomery (1584–1650)
- Philip Herbert, 5th Earl of Pembroke, 2nd Earl of Montgomery (1621–1669)
- William Herbert, 6th Earl of Pembroke, 3rd Earl of Montgomery (1642–1674)
- Philip Herbert, 7th Earl of Pembroke, 4th Earl of Montgomery (c. 1652 – 1683)
- Thomas Herbert, 8th Earl of Pembroke, 5th Earl of Montgomery (1656–1733)
- Henry Herbert, 9th Earl of Pembroke, 6th Earl of Montgomery (1693–1750)
- Henry Herbert, 10th Earl of Pembroke, 7th Earl of Montgomery (1734–1794)
- George Augustus Herbert, 11th Earl of Pembroke, 8th Earl of Montgomery (1759–1827)
- Robert Henry Herbert, 12th Earl of Pembroke, 9th Earl of Montgomery (1791–1862)
- George Robert Charles Herbert, 13th Earl of Pembroke, 10th Earl of Montgomery (1850–1895)
- Sidney Herbert, 14th Earl of Pembroke, 11th Earl of Montgomery (1853–1913)
- Reginald Herbert, 15th Earl of Pembroke, 12th Earl of Montgomery (1880–1960)
- Sidney Charles Herbert, 16th Earl of Pembroke, 13th Earl of Montgomery (1906–1969)
- Henry George Charles Alexander Herbert, 17th Earl of Pembroke, 14th Earl of Montgomery (1939–2003)
- William Alexander Sidney Herbert, 18th Earl of Pembroke, 15th Earl of Montgomery (b. 1978)

The heir apparent is the present holder's son Reginald Henry Michael Herbert, Lord Herbert (b. 2012).

An executor of Henry VIII's will and the recipient of valuable grants of land, Herbert was a prominent and powerful personage during the reign of Edward VI, with both the protector Somerset and his rival, John Dudley, afterwards Duke of Northumberland, angling for his support. He threw in his lot with Dudley, and after Somerset's fall obtained some of his lands in Wiltshire and a peerage. It has been asserted that he devised the scheme for settling the English crown on Lady Jane Grey; at all events, he was one of her advisers during her short reign, but he declared for Mary I when he saw that Lady Jane's cause was lost. Pembroke's loyalty was at times suspected by Mary and her friends, but he was employed as governor of Calais, as president of Wales and in other ways. He was also to some extent in the confidence of Philip II of Spain. The Earl retained his place at court under Elizabeth I until 1569, when he was suspected of favouring the projected marriage between Mary, Queen of Scots, and the Duke of Norfolk. Among the monastic lands granted to Herbert was the estate of Wilton, near Salisbury, still the residence of the Earls of Pembroke.

His elder son Henry (c. 1534 – 1601), who succeeded as 2nd Earl, was president of Wales from 1586 until his death. He married in 1577 Mary Sidney, the famous Countess of Pembroke (c. 1561–1621), third daughter of Sir Henry Sidney and his wife Mary Dudley. Sir Philip Sidney, to whom she was deeply attached through life, was her eldest brother. Sir Philip spent the summer of 1580 with her at Wilton, or at Ivychurch, a favourite retreat of hers close by. Here at her request, he began the Countess of Pembroke's Arcadia, which was intended for her pleasure alone, not for publication. The two also worked on a metrical edition of the Psalms. When the great sorrow of her brother's death came upon her she made herself his literary executor, correcting the unauthorized editions of the Arcadia and of his poems, which appeared in 1590 and 1591. She also took under her patronage the poets who had looked to her brother for protection. Spenser dedicated his Ruines of Time to her, and refers to her as "Urania" in Colin Clout's come home againe; in Spenser's Astrophel she is "Clorinda". In 1599 Queen Elizabeth was her guest at Wilton, and the Countess composed for the occasion a pastoral dialogue in praise of Astraea. After her husband's death, she lived chiefly in London at Crosby Hall, where she died.

The Countess's other works include A Discourse of Life and Death, translated from the French of Plessis du Mornay (1593), and Antoine (1592), a version of a tragedy of Robert Garnier. She is one of the handful of people who certain scholars conjecture may have been the true author of the plays attributed to William Shakespeare. Robin Williams' book Sweet Swan of Avon published by Wilton Circle Press, USA, documents the Countess's fascinating life as well as those of her two sons (see below).

William Herbert, 3rd Earl of Pembroke (1580–1630), eldest son of the 2nd Earl and his famous countess, was a conspicuous figure in the society of his time and at the court of James I. Several times he found himself opposed to the schemes of the Duke of Buckingham, and he was keenly interested in the colonization of America. He was Lord Chamberlain of the royal household from 1615 to 1625 and Lord Steward from 1626 to 1630. He was Chancellor of the University of Oxford in 1624 when Thomas Tesdale and Richard Wightwick refounded Broadgates Hall and named it Pembroke College in his honour. By some Shakespearian commentators, Pembroke has been identified with the "Mr W. H." referred to as "the onlie begetter" of Shakespeare's sonnets in the dedication by Thomas Thorpe, the owner of the published manuscript, while his mistress, Mary Fitton, has been identified with the "dark lady" of the sonnets. In both cases, the identification rests on very questionable evidence. He and his brother Philip (the second Herbert son who, for some profitable time, was the adored object of "bisexual" King James I's affections) are the "incomparable pair of brethren" to whom the First Folio of Shakespeare is inscribed.

The Earl left no sons when he died in London on 10 April 1630. Clarendon gives a eulogistic account of Pembroke, who appears, however, to have been a man of weak character and dissolute life. Gardiner describes him as the Hamlet of the English court. He had literary tastes and wrote poems; one of his closest friends was the poet John Donne, and he was generous to Ben Jonson, Massinger and others.

His brother, Philip Herbert, 4th Earl of Pembroke (1584–1650), was for some years the chief favourite of James I, owing this position to his comely person and his passion for hunting and for field sports generally. In 1605 King James VI and I created him Earl of Montgomery and Baron Herbert of Shurland, and since 1630, when he succeeded to the Earldom of Pembroke, the head of the Herbert family has carried the double title of Earl of Pembroke and Montgomery.

Although Philip's quarrelsome disposition often led him into trouble he did not forfeit the esteem of James I, who heaped lands and offices upon him, and he was also trusted by Charles I, who made him Lord Chamberlain in 1626 and frequently visited him at Wilton. He worked to bring about peace between the King and the Scots in 1639 and 1640, but when in the latter year the quarrel between Charles and the English parliament was renewed, he deserted the King who soon deprived him of his office of chamberlain. Trusted by the popular party, Pembroke was made governor of the Isle of Wight, and he was one of the representatives of the parliament on several occasions, notably during the negotiations at Uxbridge in 1645 and at Newport in 1648, and when the Scots surrendered Charles in 1647. From 1641 to 1643, and again from 1647 to 1650, he was Chancellor of the University of Oxford; in 1648 he removed some of the heads of houses from their positions because they would not take the Solemn League and Covenant, and his foul language led to the remark that he was more fitted "by his eloquence in swearing to preside over Bedlam than a learned academy". In 1649, although a peer, he was elected and took his seat in the House of Commons as member for Berkshire, this "ascent downwards" calling forth many satirical writings from the royalist wits. The Earl was a great collector of pictures and had some taste for architecture.

His eldest surviving son, Philip (1621–1669), became 5th Earl of Pembroke, and 2nd Earl of Montgomery; he was twice married, and was succeeded in turn by three of his sons, of whom Phillip, the 7th Earl, was notorious for bouts of homicidal mania, while Thomas, the 8th Earl (c. 1656–1733), was a person of note during the reigns of William III and Anne. From 1690 to 1692 he was first Lord of the Admiralty; then he served as Lord Privy Seal until 1699, being in 1697 the first plenipotentiary of Great Britain at the congress of Ryswick. On two occasions he was Lord High Admiral for a short period; he was also Lord President of the Council and Lord Lieutenant of Ireland, while he acted as one of the Lords Justices seven times; and he was President of the Royal Society in 1689–1690.

His son Henry, the 9th Earl (c. 1693–1750), was a soldier, but was better known as the "architect Earl." He was largely responsible for the erection of Westminster Bridge. The title descended directly to Henry, 10th Earl (1734–1794), a soldier and a Lord of the Bedchamber to George III, who wrote "The Method of Breaking Horses" (1762); then to George Augustus, 11th Earl (1759–1827), an ambassador extraordinary to Vienna in 1807.

Robert Henry, 12th Earl (1791–1862), died in France without issue and was buried in the Père Lachaise Cemetery in Paris. George Robert Charles, the 13th Earl (1850–1895), was a grandson of the 10th Earl and a son of Sidney Herbert, 1st Baron Herbert of Lea, whose second son Sidney (born 1853), after a career as a Member of Parliament, inherited all the family titles at his brother's death. His eldest son Reginald became 15th earl in March 1913. He was succeeded by his eldest son Sidney, 16th earl, who spent time in the service of the Duke of Kent and served as a trustee of the National Gallery. His son Henry Herbert, 17th Earl of Pembroke, who was often known simply as Henry Herbert, succeeded to the titles in 1969; he had a significant career as a documentarian and film director.

As of 2018, the current earl is William Herbert, 18th Earl of Pembroke, who became earl of Pembroke and 15th of Montgomery on the death of his father in 2003.

== Family trees ==
Pembroke and Montgomery family tree

Lord of Striguil (2nd creation), c. 1155; Earl of Pembroke (1st creation), 1138
Dermot MacMurrough c. 1100–c. 1171; King of Leinster	Gilbert de Clare; 1100–1147; 1st Earl of Pembroke, etc.	Isabel de Beaumont former mistress of Henry I c. 1068–1135; King of England
Aoife MacMurrough c. 1153–c. 1188	Richard de Clare; Strongbow; 1130–1176; 2nd Earl of Pembroke, etc.
Earl of Pembroke (2nd creation) and Lord of Striguil (3rd creation), 1199
Hugh X of Lusignan c. 1183–1249; Count of La Marche	Isabella c. 1186/1188 – 1246; Countess of Angoulême	John; 1166/1667 – 1216; King of England	William Marshal; 1146/1147 – 1219; 1st Earl of Pembroke, etc.	Isabel de Clare; 1172–1220; 4th Earl of Pembroke, etc. suo jure	Gilbert de Clare; 1173–1185; 3rd Earl of Pembroke, etc.
Earldom of Pembroke and lordship of Striguil transferred to her husband, 1199
Eleanor of England; 1215–1275	William Marshal; 1190–1231; 2nd Earl of Pembroke, etc.	Richard Marshal c. 1191 – 1234; 3rd Earl of Pembroke, etc.	Gilbert Marshal d. 1241; 4th Earl of Pembroke, etc.	Walter Marshal c. 1199 – 1245; 5th Earl of Pembroke, etc.	Ansel Marshal d. 1245; 6th Earl of Pembroke	Joan Marshal d. 1234
Earldom of Pembroke (2nd creation) and lordship of Striguil extinct, 1245
Earl of Pembroke (3rd creation), 1247
William de Valence c. 1225–1296; 1st Earl of Pembroke	Joan de Munchensi c. 1230–1301; Countess of Pembroke, suo jure
Isabel de Valence d. 1305 m. John Hastings, 1st Baron Hastings; 1262–1312/1313; Baron Hastings	Aymer de Valence c. 1270–1324; 2nd Earl of Pembroke	Marie de St Pol c. 1303 – 1377
Earldom of Pembroke (3rd creation) extinct, 1324
John Hastings; 1286–1325/1326; Baron Hastings	Roger Mortimer; 1287–1330; Earl of March
Earl of Pembroke (4th creation), 1339	Baron Manny, 1347
Edward III; 1312–1377; King of England	Laurence Hastings; 1319–1348; 1st Earl of Pembroke, Baron Hastings	Agnes Mortimer; 1317–1368	Edmund Mortimer; 1302/1303–1331	Katherine Mortimer c. 1314 – 1369 m. Thomas Beauchamp c. 1313 – 1369; Earl of Warwick	Walter Manny d. 1372; 1st Baron Manny
Roger Mortimer; 1328–1360; Earl of March
John of Gaunt; 1340–1399; Duke of Lancaster	Margaret of England; 1346–1361	John Hastings; 1347–1375; 2nd Earl of Pembroke, Baron Hastings	Anne Manny; 1355–1384; 2nd Baroness Manny, suo jure	Edmund Mortimer; 1352–1381; Earl of March	Philippa de Beauchamp a. 1344 – 1386 m. Hugh Stafford c. 1342 – 1386; Earl of Stafford
Henry IV c. 1367 – 1413	Elizabeth of Lancaster a. 1363 – 1426	John Hastings; 1372–1389; 3rd Earl of Pembroke, 3rd Baron Manny, Baron Hastings	Philippa Mortimer; 1375–1440	Roger Mortimer; 1374–1398; Earl of March, Earl of Ulster	Katherine de Stafford c. 1376 – 1419 m. Michael de la Pole; 1367–1415; Earl of Suffolk
Earldom of Pembroke (4th creation) and barony Manny extinct and baron Hastings dormant, 1389
Earl of Pembroke (5th creation), 1414	Earl of Pembroke (6th creation), 1447
Catherine of Valois; 1401–1437	Henry V 1386–1422	Humphrey of Lancaster; 1390–1447; Duke of Gloucester, Earl of Pembroke	Anne Mortimer; 1388 – c. 1411	William de la Pole; 1396–1450; Duke of Suffolk, Earl of Pembroke
Earldom of Pembroke (5th creation) reverted to William de la Pole, 1447	Earldom of Pembroke (6th creation) forfeited, 1450
Earl of Pembroke (7th creation), 1452	Baron Herbert of Raglan, 1461; Earl of Pembroke (8th creation), 1468
Jasper Tudor c. 1431 – 1495; Duke of Bedford, Earl of Pembroke	Henry VI; 1421–1471	William Herbert c. 1423 – 1469; 1st Earl of Pembroke, etc.	Richard Woodville; 1405–1469; Earl Rivers	Richard of York; 1411–1460; Duke of York
Earldom of Pembroke (7th creation) forfeit, 1461; restored, 1485; extinct, 1495
Richard Herbert d. 1510	William Herbert; 1451–1491; 2nd Earl of Pembroke, etc., Earl of Huntingdon	Mary Woodville c. 1456 – 1481	Elizabeth Woodville c. 1437 – 1492	Edward IV; 1442–1483
Earldom of Pembroke (8th creation) surrendered in lieu of earldom of Huntingdon, 1479	For future Barons Herbert, see Duke of Beaufort and Earl of Worcester
Earl of Pembroke (9th creation), 1479
Thomas Parr; 1478–1517	Elizabeth of York; 1466–1503 m. Henry VII; 1457–1509	Edward Plantagenet; 1470–1483; Earl of Pembroke, later Edward V
Earldom of Pembroke (9th creation) merged in the crown, 1483
Earl of Pembroke (10th creation) and Baron Herbert of Cardiff, 1551	Marquess of Pembroke, 1532
Henry Grey; 1517–1554; Duke of Suffolk	William Herbert; 1501–1570; 1st Earl of Pembroke, etc.	Anne Parr; 1515–1552	Katherine Parr; 1512–1548	Henry VIII; 1491–1547	Anne Boleyn c. 1501 or 1507 – 1536
Marquessate of Pembroke either merged in the crown, 1533 or forfeited, 1536
Jane Grey c. 1536/37 – 1554 disputed Queen of England	Katherine Grey; 1540–1568	Henry Herbert c. 1538 – 1601; 2nd Earl of Pembroke, etc.
Earl of Montgomery and Baron Herbert of Shurland, 1605
Mary Talbot c. 1580–1649	William Herbert; 1580–1630; 3rd Earl of Pembroke, etc.	Philip Herbert; 1584–1650; 4th Earl of Pembroke, etc., 1st Earl of Montgomery, etc.	Susan de Vere; 1587–1629
Mary Villiers; 1622–1685	Charles Herbert styled Lord Herbert of Shurland c. 1619 – 1635	Philip Herbert; 1621–1669; 5th Earl of Pembroke, etc., 2nd Earl of Montgomery, etc.	James Herbert c. 1623 – 1677
William Herbert; 1641–1674; 6th Earl of Pembroke, etc., 3rd Earl of Montgomery, etc.	Philip Herbert; 1652/1653–1683; 7th Earl of Pembroke, etc., 4th Earl of Montgomery, etc.	Thomas Herbert c. 1656 – 1733; 8th Earl of Pembroke, etc., 5th Earl of Montgomery, etc.	James Herbert; 1660–1704
Philip Herbert c. 1689 – 1750; 9th Earl of Pembroke, etc., 6th Earl of Montgomery, etc.	Robert Sawyer Herbert; 1693–1769	Thomas Herbert c. 1695 – 1739	William Herbert c. 1696 – 1757	Nicholas Herbert c. 1706 – 1775
Baron Porchester, 1780; Earl of Carnarvon (3rd creation), 1793
Henry Herbert; 1734–1794; 10th Earl of Pembroke, etc., 7th Earl of Montgomery, etc. m. Elizabeth Spencer; 1737–1831	Henry Herbert; 1741–1811; 1st Earl of Carnarvon, etc. m. Elizabeth Wyndham; 1752–1826
George Augustus Herbert; 1759–1827; 11th Earl of Pembroke, etc., 8th Earl of Montgomery, etc. m. Yekaterina Semyonovna Vorontsova; 1783–1856	Henry George Herbert; 1772–1833; 2nd Earl of Carnarvon, etc. m. Kitty Herbert; 1772–1813	Charles Herbert; 1774–1808	William Herbert; 1778–1847	Algernon Herbert; 1792–1855
Baron Herbert of Lea, 1861
Robert Herbert; 1791–1862; 12th Earl of Pembroke, etc., 9th Earl of Montgomery, etc.	Sidney Herbert; 1810–1861; 1st Baron Herbert of Lea m. Mary Elizabeth Ashe à Court-Repington; 1822–1911	Catherine Herbert; 1814–1886 m. Alexander Edward Murray; 1804–1845; Earl of Dunmore	Henry John George Herbert; 1800–1849; 3rd Earl of Carnarvon, etc.
George Robert Charles Herbert; 1850–1895; 13th Earl of Pembroke, etc., 10th Earl of Montgomery, etc., 2nd Baron Herbert of Lea	Sidney Herbert; 1853–1913; 14th Earl of Pembroke, etc., 110th Earl of Montgomery, etc., 3rd Baron Herbert of Lea	Henry Howard Molyneux Herbert; 1831–1890; 4th Earl of Carnarvon, etc.	Auberon Edward William Molyneux Howard Herbert; 1838–1906
Reginald Herbert; 1880–1960; 15th Earl of Pembroke, etc., 12th Earl of Montgomery, etc., 4th Baron Herbert of Lea	George Edward Stanhope Molyneux Herbert; 1866–1923; 5th Earl of Carnarvon, etc. m. Almina Victoria Maria Alexandra Wombwell; 1876–1969	Aubrey Nigel Henry Molyneux Herbert; 1880–1923	Mervyn Robert Howard Molyneux Herbert; 1882–1929
Patricia Caroline Beatrix Herbert; 1904–1994 m. William Henry Smith; 1903–1948; Viscount Hambleden	Sidney Herbert; 1906–1969; 16th Earl of Pembroke, etc., 13th Earl of Montgomery, etc., 5th Baron Herbert of Lea	David Alexander Reginald Herbert; 1908–1995	Henry George Alfred Marius Victor Francis Herbert; 1898–1987; 6th Earl of Carnarvon, etc. m. Anne Catherine Tredick Wendell; 1900–1977	Evelyn Leonora Almina Herbert; 1901–1980
Henry George Charles Alexander Herbert; 1939–2003; 17th Earl of Pembroke, etc., 14th Earl of Montgomery, etc., 6th Baron Herbert of Lea	Henry George Reginald Molyneux Herbert; 1924–2001; 7th Earl of Carnarvon, etc. m. Jean Margaret Wallop; 1935–2011
Emma Louise Herbert b. 1969	William Alexander Sidney Herbert b. 1978; 18th Earl of Pembroke, etc., 15th Earl of Montgomery, etc., 7th Baron Herbert of Lea	George Reginald Oliver Molyneux Herbert b. 1956; 8th Earl of Carnarvon, etc.
Reginald Herbert b. 2014 styled Lord Herbert	George Herbert b. 1992 styled Lord Porchester
Heir apparent to the earldoms of Pembroke and Montgomery	Heir apparent to the earldom of Carnarvon

=== Family tree of the earls of Pembroke (eighth and tenth creations) ===
William HERBERT * c. 1423 † 1469
William * 1451 † 1491	Richard *… †1510
William * 1501 † 1570
Henry * a.1538 † 1601
William; *1580 †1630	Philip; *1584 †1649
Philip; *1621 †1669
William; *1642 †1674	Philip *c. 1652 †1683	Thomas; *1656 †1733
Henry; *1693 †1750	William *b.1696 †1757
Henry; *1734 †1794	Earls of Carnarvon
George; *1759 †1827
Robert; *1791 †1862	Sidney; *1810 †1861
George; *1850 †1895	Sidney; *1853 †1913
Reginald; *1880 †1960
Sidney; *1906 †1969
Henry; *1939 †2003
William; *1978
Reginald; *2012

=== Arms of the Earldoms of Pembroke ===
Arms of Marshal, Earls of Pembroke (second creation)

Arms of de Valence, Earls of Pembroke (third creation)

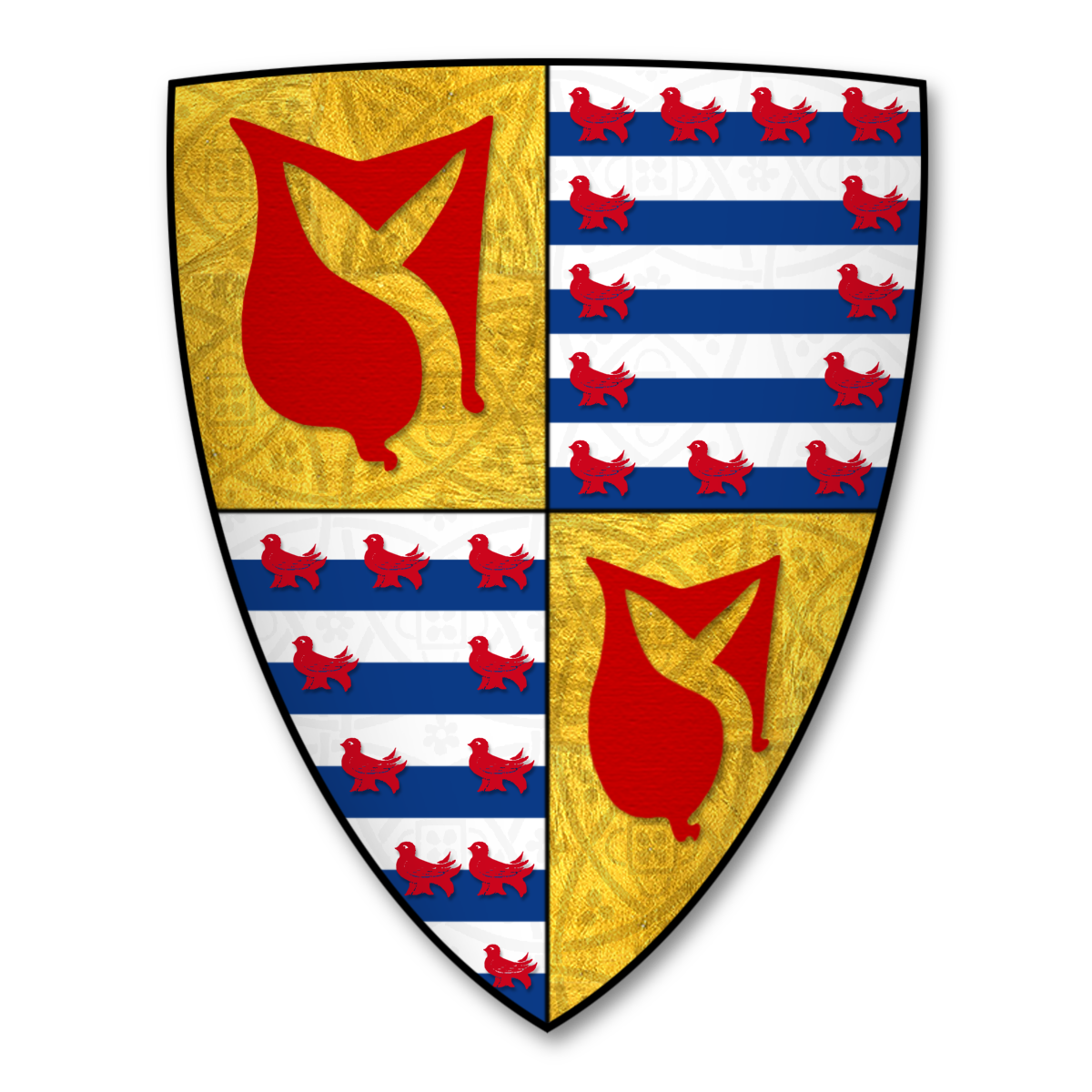
Arms of Hastings, Earls of Pembroke (fourth creation)

Quartered Arms of Humphrey of Lancaster, 1st Earl of Pembroke (fifth creation)

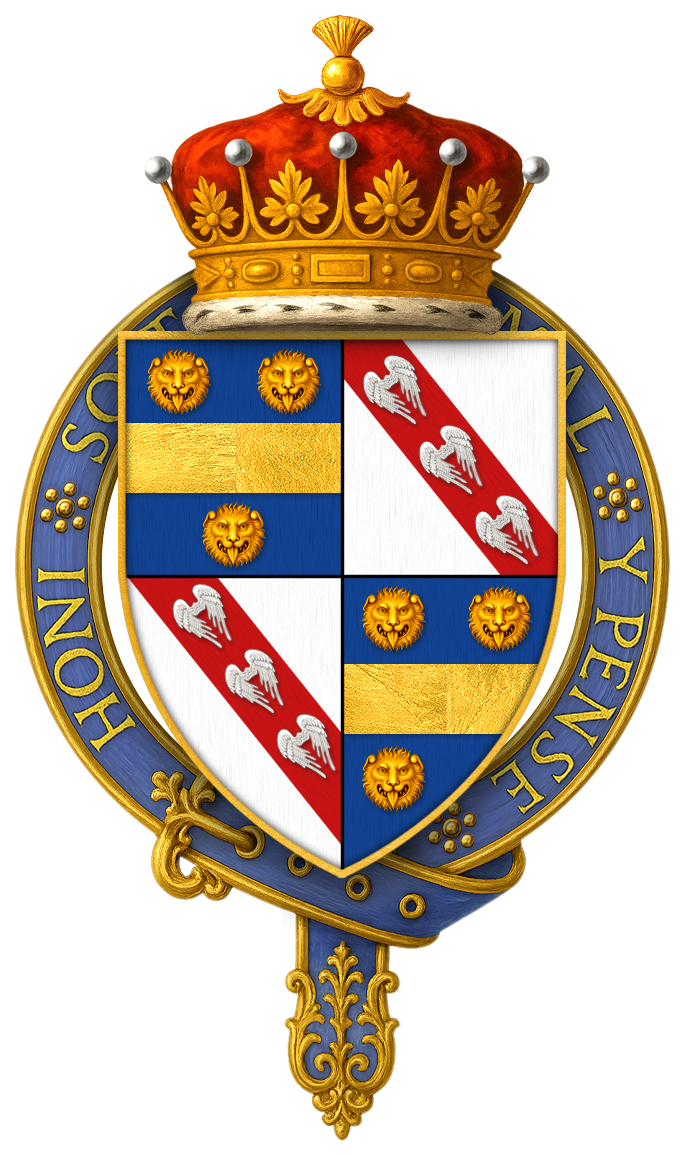
Arms of William de la Pole, 1st Earl of Pembroke (sixth creation)

Arms of Tudor, Jasper Tudor, 1st Earl of Pembroke (seventh creation)

Arms of Herbert, Earls of Pembroke (eighth creation)

Arms of Prince Edward, 1st Earl of Pembroke (ninth creation)

Arms of Anne Boleyn, 1st Marquess of Pembroke

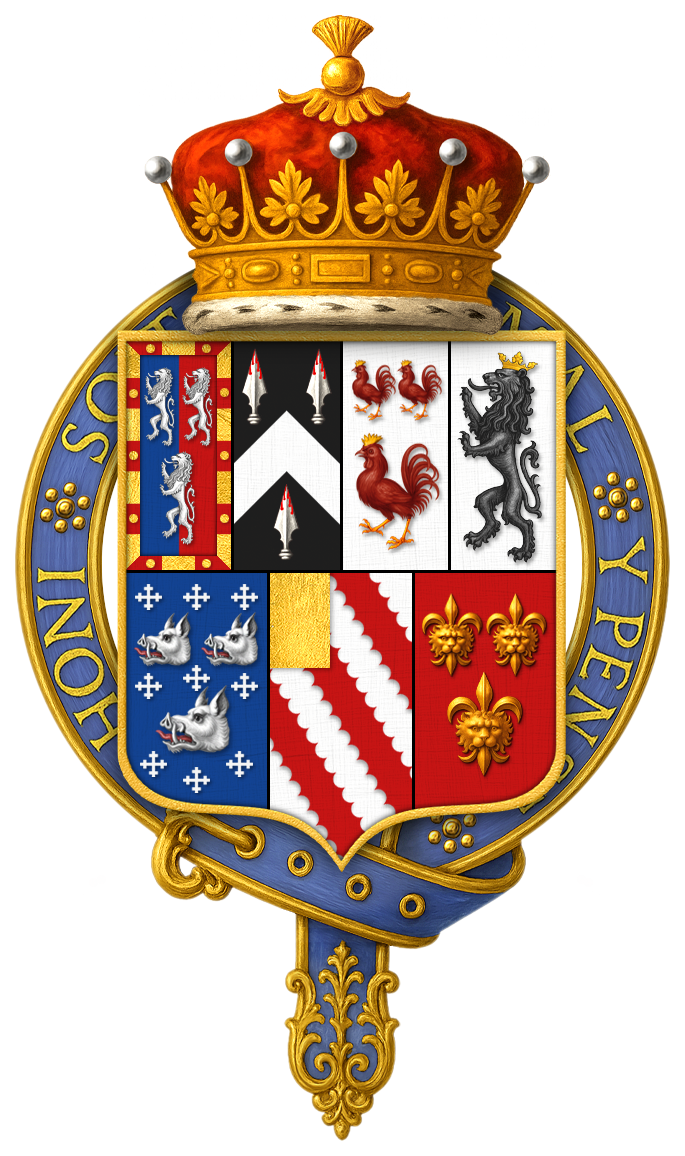
Quartered Arms of Sir William Herbert, 1st Earl of Pembroke (tenth creation)

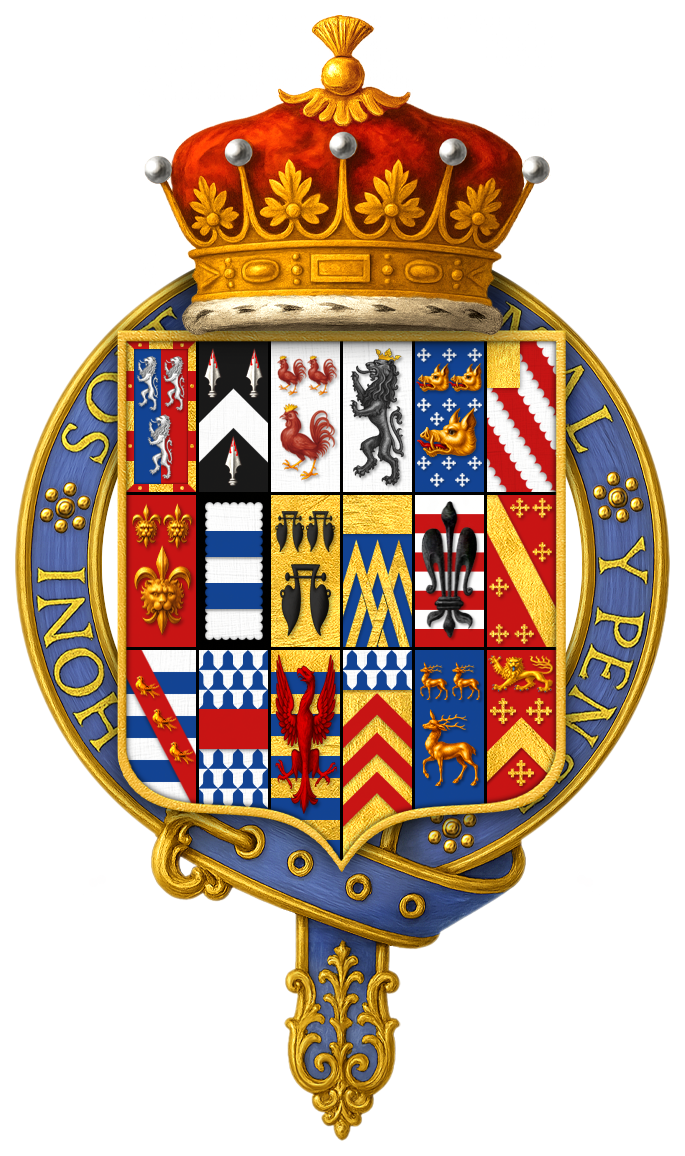
Quartered Arms of Sir Henry Herbert, 2nd Earl of Pembroke (tenth creation)

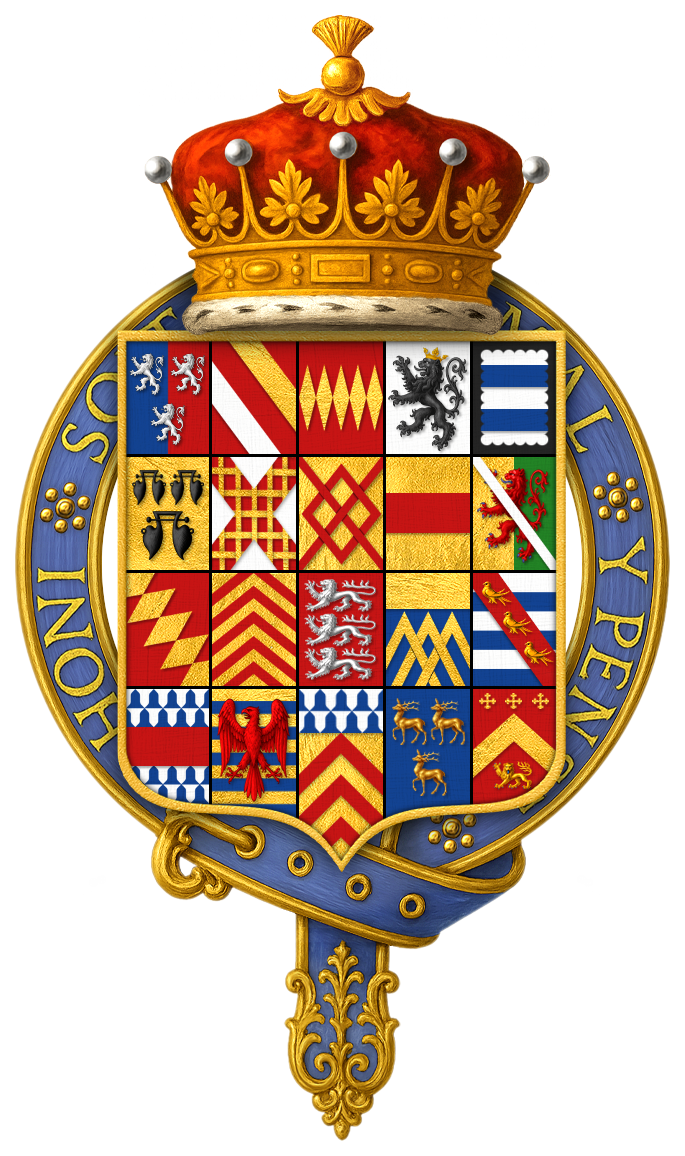
Quartered Arms of Sir William Herbert, 3rd Earl of Pembroke (tenth creation)

Arms of Herbert, Earls of Pembroke from circa 1618 (tenth creation)

== Namesakes ==
Pembroke College, Cambridge, established in 1347, is named for its founder, Marie de St Pol, Countess of Pembroke, (1303–1377), wife of Aymer de Valence, 2nd Earl of Pembroke of the third creation.

Pembroke College, Oxford, is named for William Herbert, 3rd Earl of Pembroke, of the tenth creation, Chancellor of the University of Oxford at the time of its founding in 1624.

Pembroke College in Brown University in Providence, Rhode Island, U.S., was named for Pembroke College, Cambridge, the alma mater of Roger Williams, the Puritan founder of Providence Plantations.

The city of Pembroke Pines, Florida, is thought to have been named after the Earl of Pembroke, an early landowner in Broward County.

Pembroke, New Hampshire, was named after the ninth Earl by Governor Benning Wentworth.

Pembroke, Kentucky, was not named for any of the earls of Pembroke as is sometimes claimed, but for the character of Pembroke Somerset who appeared in the popular 1803 novel Thaddeus of Warsaw, which described the 1790s uprisings in Poland. There is an all-male dorm on the campus of Belmont University in Nashville, Tennessee, Pembroke Hall, that is named after this city, as an original Trustee of the building was from the city.

Pembroke, Ontario, is named in honour of Secretary of State for the Colonies Sidney Herbert, 1st Baron Herbert of Lea, younger son of George Herbert, 11th Earl of Pembroke of the tenth creation.

Pembroke Parish, Bermuda, is named for William Herbert, 3rd Earl of Pembroke, of the tenth creation.

Pembroke, Malta, was named for Robert Herbert, 12th Earl of Pembroke of the tenth creation, and was authorised in 1859 by Sidney Herbert, 1st Baron Herbert of Lea, his younger brother, then Secretary at War.

== Notes ==
The seventh Earl was twice involved in trials for murder: in 1677–78, and the killing of William Smeethe, a London Officer of the Watch, in 1680.

== Sources ==
- G. T. Clark, The Earls, Earldom and Castle of Pembroke (Tenby 1880)
- Planche, J. R. (1855). "The Earls of Strigul". The Proceedings of the British Archaeological Association. x: 265–274.
- G. E. Cokayne, Complete Peerage, vol. vi. (London, 1895).
- Giraldus Cambrensis, Expugnatio Hibernica
- The Song of Dermot, edited by G. H. Orpen (1892).
- The metrical French life, Histoire de Guillaume le Marchal (ed. P. Meyer, 3 vols., Paris, 1891–1901)
- The Minority of Henry III, by G. J. Turner (Trans. Royal Hist. Soc., new series, vol. xviii. pp. 245295)
- W. Stubbs, Constitutional History, chs. xii. and xiv. (Oxford, 1896–1897).
