= William Herbert, 18th Earl of Pembroke =

English peer

The Right Honourable The Earl of Pembroke
- Predecessor: Henry Herbert
- Other titles: 15th Earl of Montgomery
- Born: William Alexander Sidney Herbert; 18 May 1978 (age 48)
- Residence: Wilton House, near Salisbury, Wiltshire; London
- Spouse: Victoria Bullough (m. 2010)
- Issue: Lady Alexandra Herbert; Reginald Herbert, Lord Herbert; Hon. Louis Herbert; Lady Beatrice Herbert
- Heir: Reginald Herbert
- Parents: Henry Herbert, 17th Earl of Pembroke; Claire Pelly

William Alexander Sidney Herbert, 18th Earl of Pembroke, 15th Earl of Montgomery (born 18 May 1978), styled as Lord Herbert until 2003, is an English peer.

== Early life ==
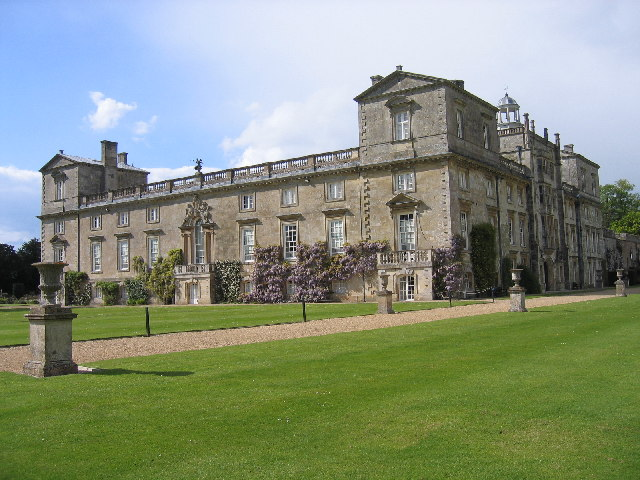
Wilton House

Pembroke is the only son of Henry Herbert, 17th Earl of Pembroke, by his first wife, Claire.

He has three older sisters (including Lady Emma Herbert) and three younger half-sisters by his father's second marriage. He was educated at Bryanston School, and then at the University of Leeds for two years, where he took a foundation course in 3D computer graphics design. He then pursued a course in industrial design at Sheffield Hallam University and became the first Herbert to graduate with a first class honours degree.

In 2003, his father died, and he inherited the ancestral titles and estates, based on Wilton House, the family seat in Wiltshire.

== Career ==
After graduating, Pembroke worked with Terence Conran as an industrial designer. In October 2004, a year after his father's death, he left that job to assume the responsibilities of managing the house and estate at Wilton. In an interview with The Observer in July 2005, he spoke frankly of the responsibilities and difficulties in managing a historic home and estate. He wanted to increase the number of celebrity events, such as Madonna's birthday party, at Wilton House to increase revenues; however, opening the property to more tourists does not pay in the long run, he said, as it increases wear-and-tear on the house. He also spoke of the need for him to marry and father a son to secure the succession, for the sake of his immediate family and also of the estate and house and all those who depend on them for a livelihood. His heir presumptive at that time was a distant cousin, the present George Herbert, 8th Earl of Carnarvon (born 1956).

As of 2006, the Wilton estate had around 30 employees. Its 14,000 acres are divided into 14 farms, one of which is run by the estate, and more than 200 residential properties. Although the house is open to the public, Pembroke and his wife occupy about a third of the house privately.

Since 2006, he has held the position of President of the Stars Appeal, a fundraising charity for Salisbury district hospital, and an active member of its fundraising committee. Since 2010, in partnership with his wife Victoria, he has overseen an extensive programme of renovation both externally and internally at Wilton along with its surrounding buildings and structures. The work has subsequently received a number of awards and accolades. In 2021 Pembroke completed an MSc in Rural Estate Management at the Royal Agricultural University, Cirencester.

== Motoring ==
A keen car and motor racing enthusiast, Pembroke has raced at Le Mans in a Jaguar D-Type and in the Funcup endurance series since 2009. In 2011, he had a class win in the Spa 25 hour race against 120 international teams. He used to hold an annual Classic and Supercar show in the grounds of Wilton House but it was cancelled in 2017 for unknown reasons. He has owned various classic cars, and his road car collection includes a Mercedes 300SL, an Invicta Type-S 'Low Chassis' and a Porsche 911.

In a 2019 interview with Campden FB, he offered advice to those looking to diversify their investment portfolios with the addition of vintage cars, highlighting the taxable benefits, but also some of the potential pitfalls.

== Personal life ==
In April 2009, Pembroke announced his engagement to his long-time girlfriend, Victoria Bullough. They were married on 29 May 2010 at the parish church of St Mary and St Nicholas in Wilton, near Salisbury.

Their first child, Lady Alexandra Eloise Ekaterina, was born on 3 April 2011. A son and heir apparent, Reginald Henry Michael, Lord Herbert, was born on 21 October 2012. A third child, Louis Charles Alexander Herbert, was born on 20 September 2014, and a fourth, Lady Beatrice Aurelia Skye Herbert, on 15 March 2016.

The Countess of Pembroke is a daughter of Michael Bullough, the former owner of McEwens, a department store in Scotland. Her mother, Sandra Lee-Graham Bullough, is a former model. She grew up in Huntingtower, Perth, and was educated at Glenalmond College, and then studied interior architecture at Chelsea College of Art and Design. While there, she appeared in Country Life and met Lord Pembroke. She is now a patroness of the Royal Caledonian Ball.

Pembroke is collaterally related to the Meyrick Family, who seat a number of nearby Lordships.

== Succession ==
Since Herbert's father had no brothers, and his grandfather's brothers died unmarried, and other lines of descent from earlier earls have become extinct, the heir presumptive to the earldoms of Pembroke (created 1551 by Edward VI) and Montgomery (created for the brother of the 3rd Earl, who succeeded him as 4th Earl) was the 8th Earl of Carnarvon (born 10 November 1956), holding the earldom created in 1793 for the first son of the second surviving son of the 8th Earl. However, since their marriage in 2010, the 18th Earl and Countess have produced two daughters and two sons; the heir apparent is Reginald, Lord Herbert, born in 2012.

== Sources ==
Articles

- July/August 2009 issue: Apollo, The International Magazine for Collectors. "Tradition with a Twist", by Michael Hall. Includes 2007 official portrait of William Herbert, 18th Earl of Pembroke by American painter and portraitist, Adrian Gottlieb
- Interview with "William Herbert, 18th Earl of Pembroke, 15th Earl of Montgomery, 18th Baron Herbert of Cardiff, 15th Baron Herbert of Shurland and 7th Baron Herbert of Lea."
- Lynn Barber. ""Heirs and Graces," The Observer, 31 July 2005.
- Edward Lewine. Includes photographs of the earl and interiors of Wilton House.

Genealogy

- Further heirs in Carnarvon E branch

Portraits

- Gallery of paintings by Adrian Gottlieb including Official Portrait of William Herbert, 18th Earl Pembroke (2007), and Intimate portrait of Miss Victoria Bullough commissioned by Lord William Herbert (2007).
- Official Portrait of William Herbert, 18th Earl Pembroke, 15th Earl Montgomery © 2007 By Adrian Gottlieb
- Tori, Portrait of Victoria Bullough ©2007 By Adrian Gottlieb

Peerage of England
Preceded by Henry Herbert	Earl of Pembroke; Earl of Montgomery; 2003–present	Incumbent; Heir apparent: Reginald Herbert
