= Henry Herbert, 17th Earl of Pembroke =

British noble and film director (1939–2003)

The Earl of Pembroke
- 17th Earl of Pembroke; 14th Earl of Montgomery
- Predecessor: Sidney Herbert, 16th Earl of Pembroke
- Successor: William Herbert, 18th Earl of Pembroke
- Other titles: Lord Herbert (1960–69)
- Other names: Henry Herbert
- Born: Henry George Charles Alexander Herbert; 19 May 1939
- Died: 5 October 2003 (aged 64)
- Spouses: Claire Pelly (m. 1966; div. 1981) Miranda Kendall Oram (m. 1988)
- Issue: 7, including Lady Emma Herbert and William Herbert, 18th Earl of Pembroke
- Parents: Sidney Herbert, 16th Earl of Pembroke; Mary Dorothea Hope
- Occupation: Film director and producer

Henry George Charles Alexander Herbert, 17th Earl of Pembroke, 14th Earl of Montgomery (19 May 1939 – 7 October 2003), styled Lord Herbert between 1960 and 1969 and often known simply as Henry Herbert, was a British landowner, member of the House of Lords, film director, and producer.

== Background and education ==
Herbert was the only son of the 16th Earl of Pembroke and 13th Earl of Montgomery and his wife, Mary (a daughter of the 1st Marquess of Linlithgow) and a godson of Prince George, Duke of Kent. Through the 11th Earl of Pembroke, he descended from Countess Catherine Vorontsov. He was educated at Eton and Christ Church, Oxford and briefly served with the Royal Horse Guards from 1958 to 1960 before, in 1969, inheriting his father's titles and estate centred on Wilton House in Wiltshire.

== Career in the film industry ==
Herbert began to take an interest in the film business in the 1960s and worked on the set of The Heroes of Telemark (1965). After making documentaries about musicians, the first feature film he directed was Malachi's Cove (1974), also known as The Seaweed Children, starring Donald Pleasence and Arthur English, but he is best remembered for his second film, Emily (1976), a picture set in the 1920s starring Koo Stark. He also worked on episodes of the TV series Shoestring and Bergerac, as well as directing the film Crossmaheart (1998). In 1997 he co-produced The Girl with Brains in Her Feet.

In their book Great Houses of England & Wales (1994), Hugh Massingberd and Christopher Simon Sykes commented that "The present Lord Pembroke is (as Henry Herbert) a film and television director, best known for the Civil War drama series By the Sword Divided and for Emily."

== Family ==
On 20 January 1966, he married Claire Rose, daughter of Douglas Gurney Pelly, scion of the Pelly baronets. They had four children:

- Lady Sophia Elizabeth Herbert (10 December 1966); married Alexander Murray Threipland in 2001. They have one son:
  - Finnian Wyndham Murray Threipland (13 April 2004)
- Lady Emma Louise Herbert (12 March 1969); married Robin Vickers in 2005. They have two children:
  - Vanessa Esvedra Rose Vickers (2006)
  - Vincent Sidney Vickers (2009)
- Lady Flora Katinka Herbert (22 September 1970)
- William Alexander Sidney Herbert, 18th Earl of Pembroke (18 May 1978); married Victoria Bullough on 29 May 2010. They have four children.

The couple divorced in 1981. Lady Pembroke married Stuart Wyndham Murray Threipland (1947-2023), the father of her son-in-law, in 1984.

In 1988 Pembroke married Miranda Juliet (born 1962), daughter of Lt John Somerville Kendall Oram, of Whitwick Manor, Ledbury, Herefordshire, and his first wife, Juliet Hermione, daughter of John Roland Abbey, of Redlynch House, Salisbury, the former High Sheriff of Sussex. They had three daughters.

- Lady Jemima Juliet Davies, née Herbert (4 October 1989), married (2021) Hugo Davies at Wilton House
  - Delfina Davies (2022)
  - Mariella Davies (2025)
- Lady Alice Mary Herbert (10 November 1991)
- Lady Katie Ella Herbert (26 August 1997)

Pembroke died in 2003, and his titles and estates passed to his only son, William Herbert.

Peerage of England
Preceded by Sidney Herbert	Earl of Pembroke; Earl of Montgomery; 1969–2003	Succeeded by William Herbert
