= Sidney Herbert, 16th Earl of Pembroke =

British peer

The Earl of Pembroke
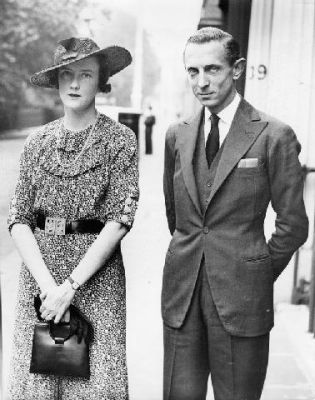
- Sidney Herbert, 16th Earl of Pembroke and his wife, Mary
- Reign: 1960–69
- Predecessor: Reginald Herbert
- Successor: Henry Herbert
- Spouse: Lady Mary Dorothea Hope
- Issue: 2
- Father: Reginald Herbert, 15th Earl of Pembroke
- Mother: Beatrice Eleanor Paget
- Occupation: Comptroller and Private Secretary to the Duchess of Kent

Sidney Herbert, 16th Earl of Pembroke, 13th Earl of Montgomery CVO (9 January 1906 – 16 March 1969) was a British peer.

== Life and career ==
Herbert was the son of Reginald Herbert, 15th Earl of Pembroke and Beatrice Eleanor Paget (of the marquesses of Anglesey). His ancestor, the 11th Earl of Pembroke, married Countess Catherine Vorontsov, the daughter of a prominent aristocratic Russian family.

Pembroke was educated at Eton and Pembroke College, Oxford. He served in World War II in the Royal Artillery. He was Comptroller and Private Secretary to the Duchess of Kent, 1942–1948, as well as Equerry to the Duke of Kent. He was a Trustee of the National Gallery, 1942–1949 and 1953–1960; Trustee of the National Portrait Gallery, 1944–1958; Member of the Historical Manuscripts Commission, 1941–1958. President of Historic Churches Trust. Justice of the Peace, 1954. Lord Lieutenant of Wiltshire, 1954–1969, and an alderman of Wiltshire County Council, 1954–1967.

On 27 July 1936 he married Lady Mary Dorothea Hope, daughter of the late John Hope, 1st Marquess of Linlithgow and the Dowager Marchioness of Linlithgow. The couple had two children: Lady Diana Mary Herbert (19 April 1937 – 24 November 2008) and Henry George Charles Herbert (19 May 1939 – 7 October 2003). He was succeeded by his son.

Honorary titles
Preceded by The Duke of Somerset	Lord Lieutenant of Wiltshire; 1954–1969	Succeeded by The Lord Margadale
Peerage of England
Preceded by Reginald Herbert	Earl of Pembroke; Earl of Montgomery; 1960–1969	Succeeded by Henry Herbert
