= Ministry of Defence Main Building (United Kingdom) =

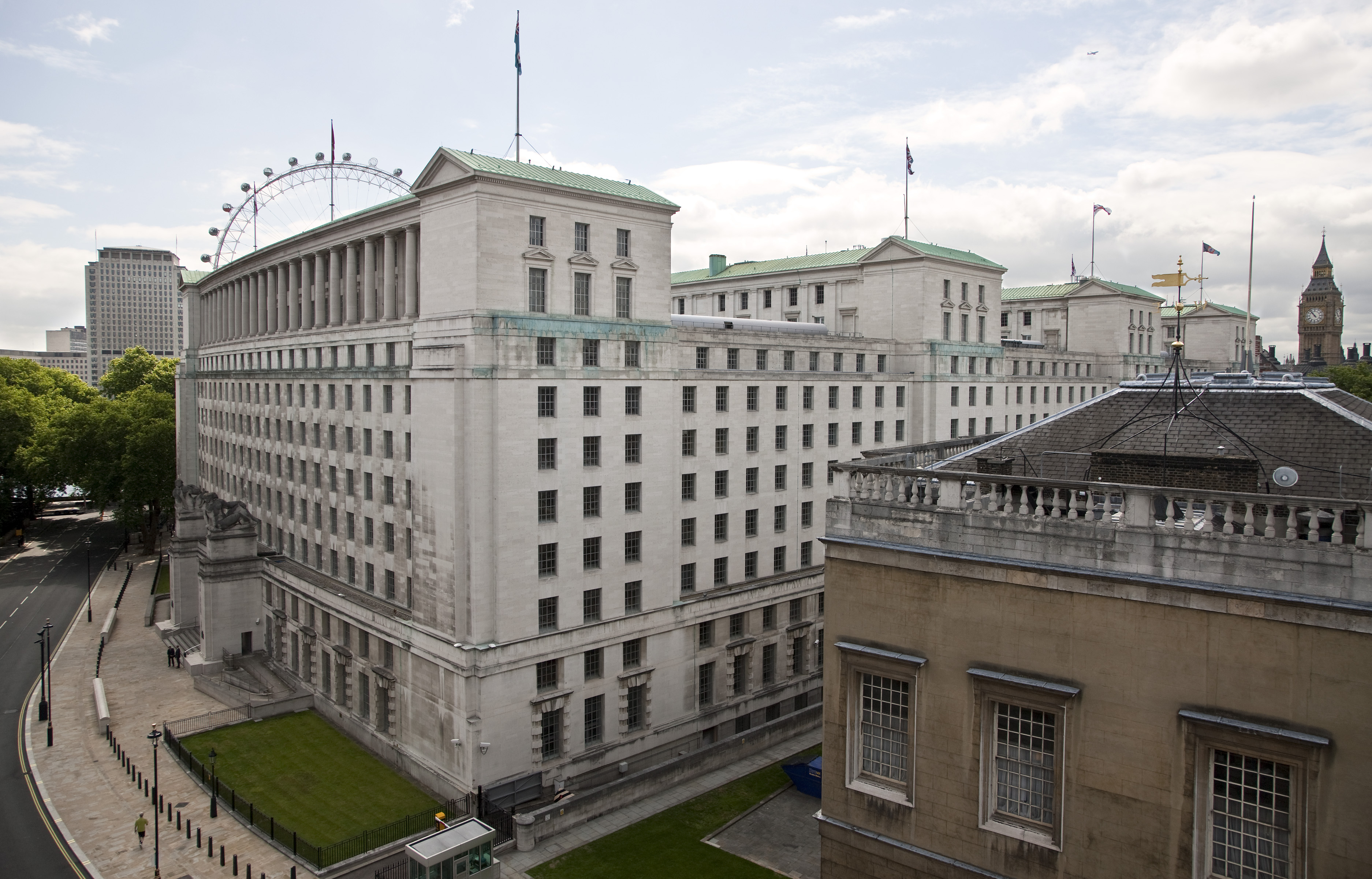
- The Ministry of Defence Main Building in 2011
- Former names: Whitehall Gardens Building

General information
- Status: Completed
- Type: Government office
- Location: Whitehall; City of Westminster; SW1A 2HB, London, United Kingdom
- Coordinates: 51.5040°N 0.1249°W
- Current tenants: Ministry of Defence (MOD)
- Completed: 1959; 67 years ago
- Renovated: 2000–2004
- Renovation cost: £746 million
- Owner: HM Government

Height
- Architectural: Neoclassical

Technical details
- Material: Portland stone and copper roof
- Floor count: 13 (10 above ground and 3 below)

Design and construction
- Architect: E. Vincent Harris
- Developer: HM Government
- Other designers: Sir Charles Wheeler (Sculptor); David McFall (Sculptor)
- Main contractor: Trollope & Colls

Renovating team
- Architect: HOK
- Renovating firm: Ministry of Defence and Modus Services
- Structural engineer: Alan Baxter
- Services engineer: WSP
- Main contractor: Skanska

Other information
- Public transit: Westminster; Westminster Millennium Pier

Listed Building – Grade I
- Official name: Ministry of Defence, containing Sixteenth Century undercroft and historic rooms numbers 13, 24, 25, 27 and 79
- Designated: 14 January 1970
- Reference no.: 1278223

The Ministry of Defence Main Building or MOD Main Building, also known as MOD Whitehall or originally as the Whitehall Gardens Building, is a Grade I listed government office building located on Whitehall in London. The building was designed by E. Vincent Harris in 1915 and constructed between 1939 and 1959 on part of the site of the Palace of Whitehall, specifically Pelham House, Cromwell House, Montagu House, Pembroke House and part of Whitehall Gardens. It was initially occupied by the Air Ministry and the Board of Trade before becoming the current home of the Ministry of Defence in 1964.

By the 1990s the building was no longer considered fit for purpose and had become expensive to maintain. A major refurbishment was therefore undertaken between 2000 and 2004 through a private finance initiative contract.

== Location ==
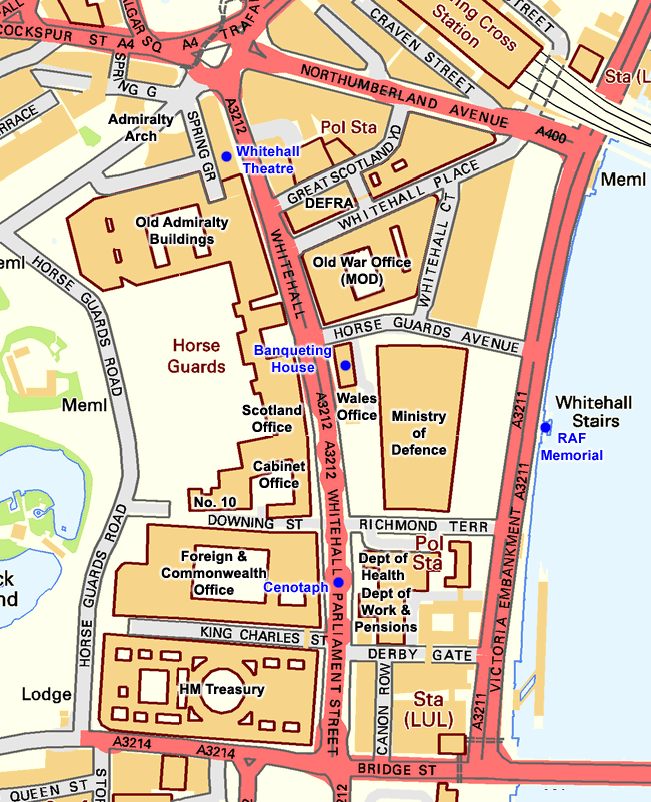
Map of Whitehall showing the MOD Main Building in relation to other government buildings and the River Thames

Comprising a site of 3 hectares (7.4 acres), the building is located on Whitehall within the City of Westminster, central London. Whitehall is lined with numerous government departments and offices and is close to the Houses of Parliament. Whitehall is located to the west. Between Whitehall and Main Building is Banqueting House which is the only remaining component of the Palace of Whitehall to survive intact. To the north is Horse Guards Avenue. The street is home to Whitehall Court and also the Old War Office building, former government offices which have been converted into mixed use development including a hotel, restaurants and apartments. The building is separated from Victoria Embankment and the River Thames to the east by public gardens known as Whitehall Gardens. Richmond Terrace is to the south and is now used as a private car park, although a public pedestrian route is maintained. Adjacent to Richmond Terrace is the Curtis Green Building, the headquarters of the Metropolitan Police Service since November 2016 and otherwise known as New Scotland Yard. The neighbouring building, Richmond House, provides additional office space for Parliament.

The building is located within the Whitehall Conservation Area, and was identified by Westminster City Council as a landmark building within their 2003 audit of the conservation area.

Queen Mary's Steps, once part of the Palace of Whitehall, are near the north east corner of the building. They indicate the position of the river before the Thames Embankment was built.

== Early history ==
=== Previous use of site ===
The building is located on the site of the Palace of Whitehall, which was the main residence of the English monarchs in London from 1530 until 1698 when most of its structures were destroyed by a fire. Despite some rebuilding, financial constraints prevented large-scale reconstruction. In the second half of the 18th century, much of the site was leased for the construction of town houses. By the early 19th century some of the Georgian town houses were occupied as government offices.

=== Design and construction ===
In 1909, a decision was taken to construct a new significant government building on the Whitehall Gardens site, primarily to be used by the Board of Trade. Architect E. Vincent Harris won a national competition in 1915 to design the building. The selected site was proposed to extend over Whitehall Gardens and ground adjacent to Victoria Embankment. Opposition to this idea however led to the southern building-line extending no further than that of the neighbouring Whitehall Court and National Liberal Club buildings to the north. This resulted in a reduction of proposed floor space of approximately 10,000 square feet (930 m^{2}). Due to the outbreak of the First World War the start of work was delayed.

The Office of Works issued a requirement in 1933 for a significantly larger building and Harris was again selected as architect. The building was to comprise a single block in the Neoclassical design, faced in Portland stone, some 128 feet (39 m) high and 570 feet (170 m) long, with a depth of 205 feet (62 m), widening to 300 feet (91 m) feet. It was to be formed as four internal blocks of ten storeys surrounding three internal courtyards with the two main elevations facing Whitehall and the Victoria Embankment.

Work was again delayed due to the interwar economic depression. However, activity started on site in 1938 when town houses in Whitehall Gardens were demolished. Five rooms from Pembroke House, Cromwell House and Cadogan House were dismantled and incorporated into the building as conference rooms. The rooms are now known as the "Historic Rooms" and are located on the third and fourth floors (see Historic Rooms section).

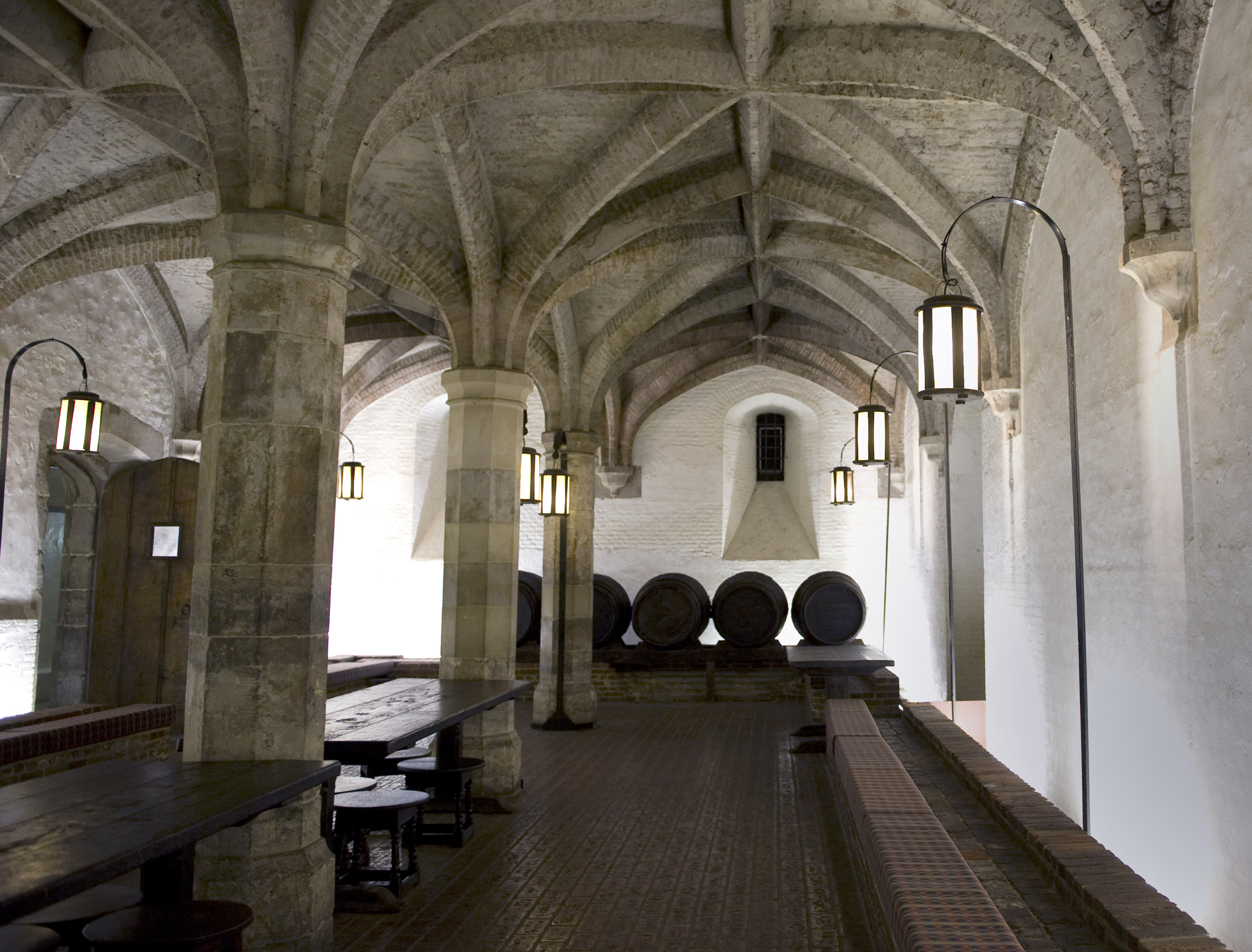
Henry VIII's wine cellar beneath Main Building

Due to the wishes of Queen Mary and after providing assurances to Parliament, arrangements were made for the preservation of a 16th-century Tudor brick-vaulted wine cellar which had originally been located in Cadogan House, the York Place home of Cardinal Wolsey. The 70 feet (21 m) long and 30 feet (9.1 m) wide cellar consists of 10 bays with 4 octagonal piers and had been incorporated into Whitehall Palace by Henry VIII. The cellar was similar in design and construction to the wine cellar at Hampton Court Palace, featuring brick with stone dressings. Prior to the redevelopment of the site it had been used as a luncheon room by the Ministry of Transport. The existing position of the cellar was not compatible with the plans for the new building so it was decided to move it so it could be incorporated into the basement.

Construction progress on the building was short-lived as work largely stopped in 1939 at the outbreak of the Second World War. Work recommenced at the end of hostilities and in 1949 the wine cellar was encased by the contractor, Trollope & Colls, in protective layers of concrete, steel and brick and placed on mahogany cushions, carriage rails and steel rollers. It was then moved 43 feet 6 inches (13.26 m) to one side onto a specially designed steel frame so that a 20-foot (6.1 m) hole could be created on its original site. The 1,000 ton structure was lowered on screwjacks, and then moved 33 feet 10 inches (10.31 m) back to its final position.

=== Opening and operational use ===
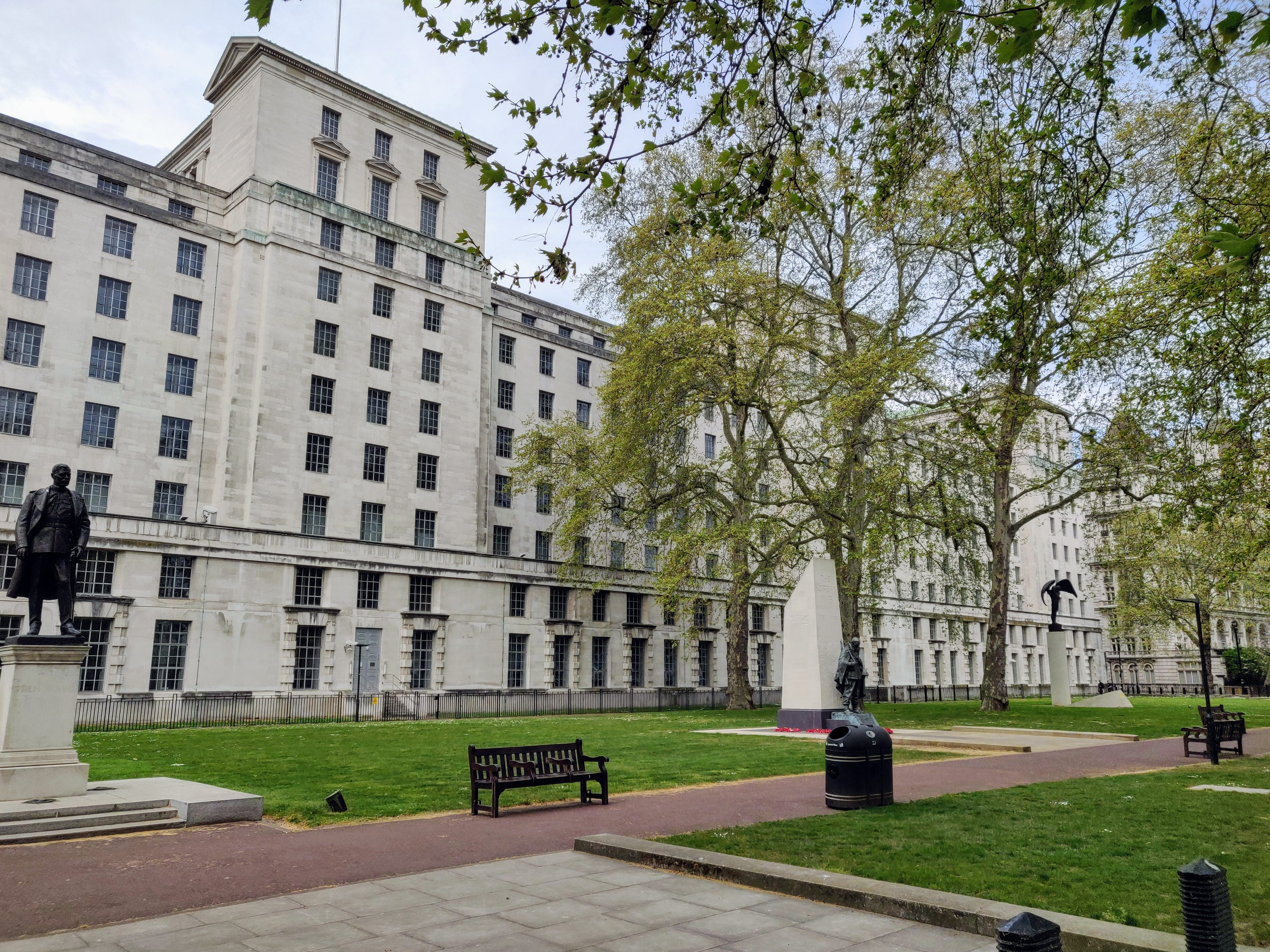
Main Building with Whitehall Gardens in the foreground

In 1951, the northern end of the building was ready for occupation by the Board of Trade. The Air Ministry took occupation of the southern part of the building when it was completed in 1959.

The Whitehall Gardens Building, as it was known when it opened, was Harris' last major work and the last significant neoclassical style government building. The September 1951 edition of Building magazine praised the new building; however, it became known as the 'Whitehall Monster' and was described by architectural historian Nikolaus Pevsner as a 'monument of tiredness'.

In 1964, the former incarnation of the Ministry of Defence, the Admiralty, the War Office and the Air Ministry, were combined to form the modern Ministry of Defence. This generated a requirement for a single large building to accommodate staff for the new ministry and the Whitehall Gardens Building was identified as the preferred option, with the Board of Trade moving to the Victoria area of London.

On 14 January 1970, the building was Grade I listed by English Heritage as a building of exceptional interest.

== Redevelopment ==
=== Contract ===
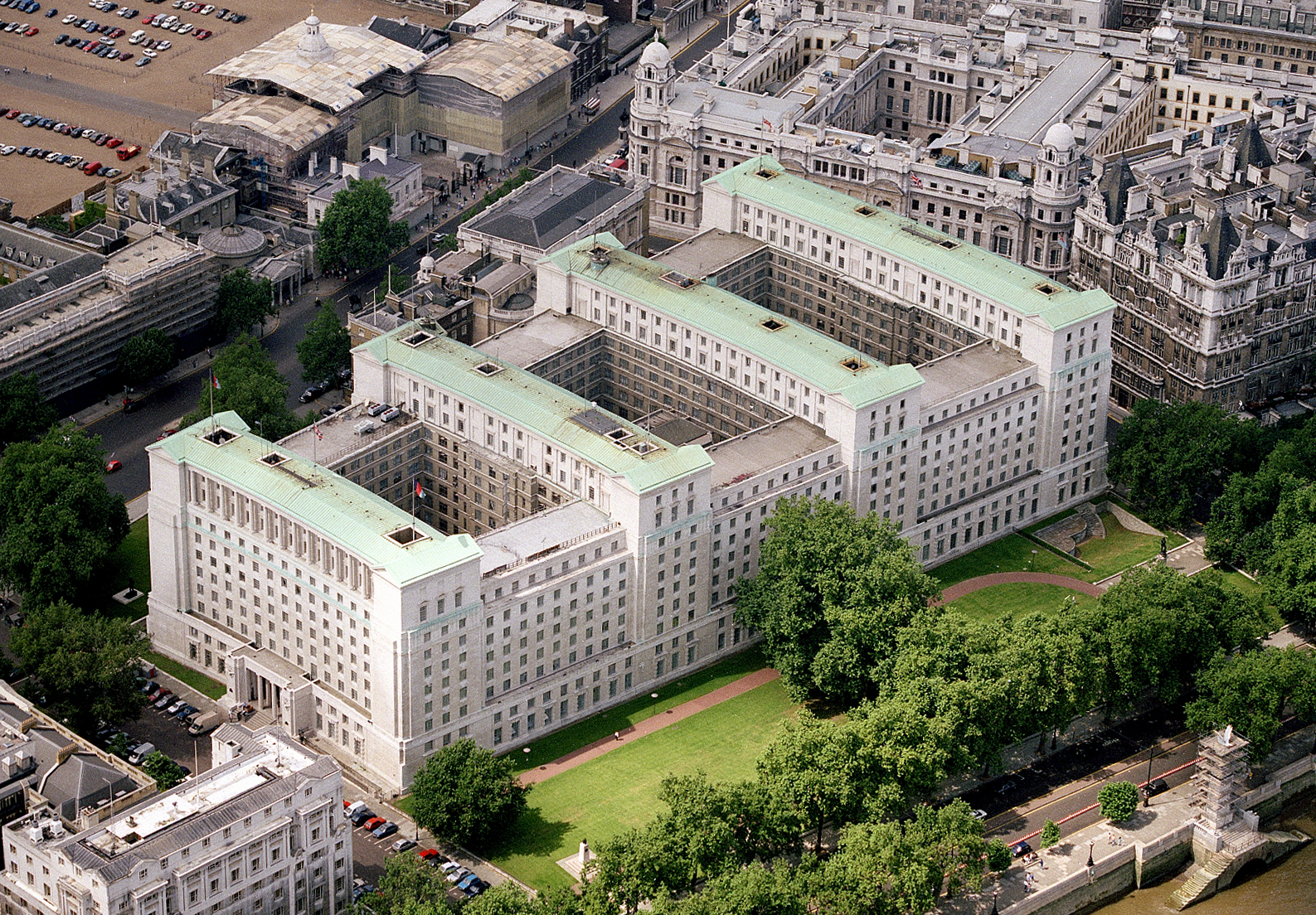
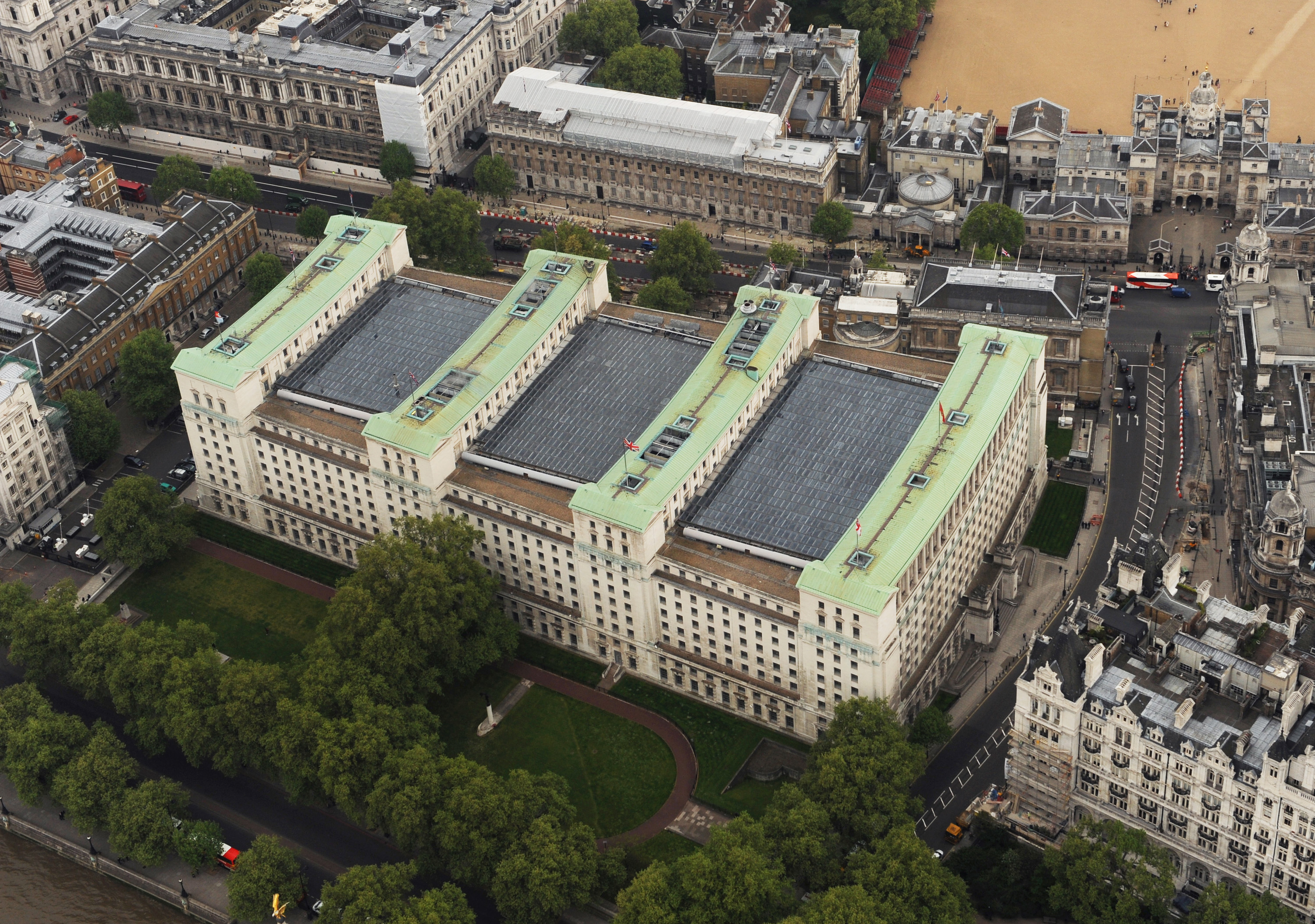
The three internal courtyards were enclosed to create atriums as part of the building's redevelopment in the early 2000s

In the early 1990s, the MOD recognised that the condition of Main Building was no longer fit for modern business requirements. Maintenance had become expensive and inefficient and the building no longer met modern safety standards. At the same time, the MOD was seeking to reduce the number of staff it had within London so that it could make savings by consolidating its built estate. The decision was therefore made to redevelop Main Building and a 30-year long private finance initiative (PFI) contract for its redevelopment and ongoing maintenance & facilities management was awarded in May 2000. The contract also included the refurbishment, maintenance and running of three central London MOD offices (Northumberland House, Metropole Building and St Giles' Court) for the temporary accommodation of staff decanted from Main Building during the redevelopment. The capital expenditure involved was £531 million.

The contract winner, Modus, was a consortium consisting of Innisfree PFI Funds (40.1% shareholding), Laing Investments (40.1%) and Amey Ventures (19.9%). American firm HOK was selected as architecture and interior design consultant, Alan Baxter as structural engineers and WSP as mechanical & electrical engineers. Kværner Construction were the main construction contractor; however, in August 2000 Kværner was bought over by Swedish multinational Skanska.

=== Construction ===
The decant of staff to other buildings was completed in August 2001. In September of that year a ceremony took place to mark the commencement of works when Skanska's CEO Keith Clarke and Chief of Defence Staff Admiral Sir Michael Boyce assisted Secretary of State for Defence Geoff Hoon to demolish a wall of his old office.

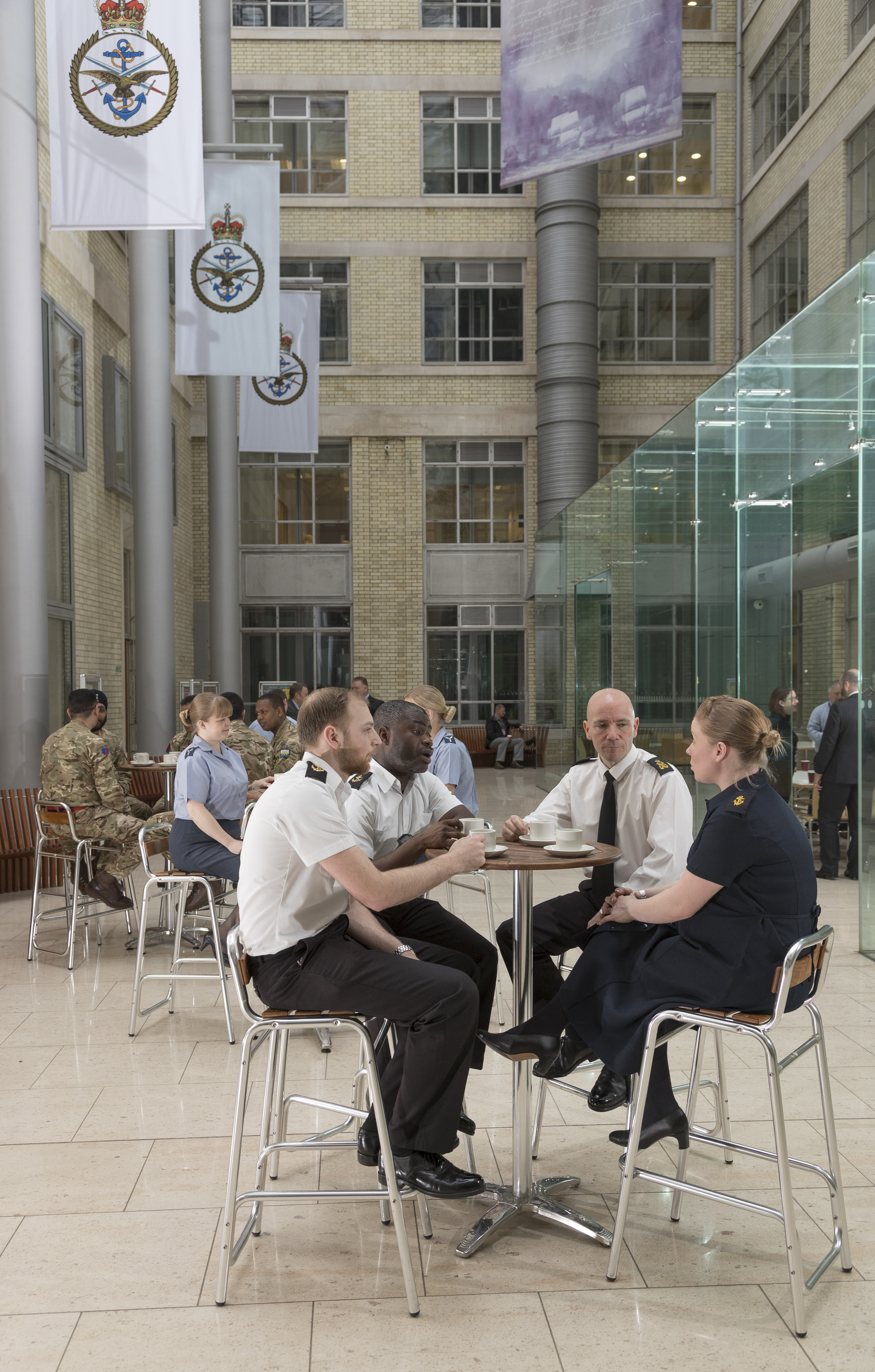
Staff within an atrium area at Main Building

The redevelopment saw the existing cellular room layout changed into an open-plan office layout to improve collaboration between staff and the working environment. All mechanical and electrical services were upgraded along with IT networks. New communal spaces were created including a library, restaurant, coffee shop, business & press suite and nursery. The internal courtyards were enclosed to create three new atria within the building. Security and anti-terrorism measures were integrated into the building, with the MOD changing such requirements after the 9/11 terrorist attacks. Original historic features of the building were protected and restored during the redevelopment, such as the replacement of oak doors and terrazzo marble floor of the Pillared Hall. All 2,494 metal windows in the building were refurbished and repaired.

The capacity of the building was increased from 2,800 to 3,300 staff. This allowed the MOD to dispose of five buildings in central London, these being Northumberland House, the Metropole Building, Great Scotland Yard, St. Giles Court and St Christopher House.

The building was handed back to the MOD in July 2004 and re-occupation by 3,150 staff was completed in September 2004, two months ahead of schedule.

=== Controversy ===
The MOD were accused of excessive spending on the redevelopment project. Specific allegations included the cost of Herman Miller Aeron office chairs which had a retail price of £1,050 each, lavish spending on the refurbishment of historic features and the provision of staff facilities including the coffee shop, restaurant and quiet rooms. In response, the MOD said that chairs were purchased at a large discount (approximately a third of the normal price); many of the aspects of the refurbishment relating to historic features were required by English Heritage, reflecting the building's Grade I listed status; and that staff facilities were generally not subsidised and were required to ensure an acceptable level of staff welfare and to provide a suitable working environment.

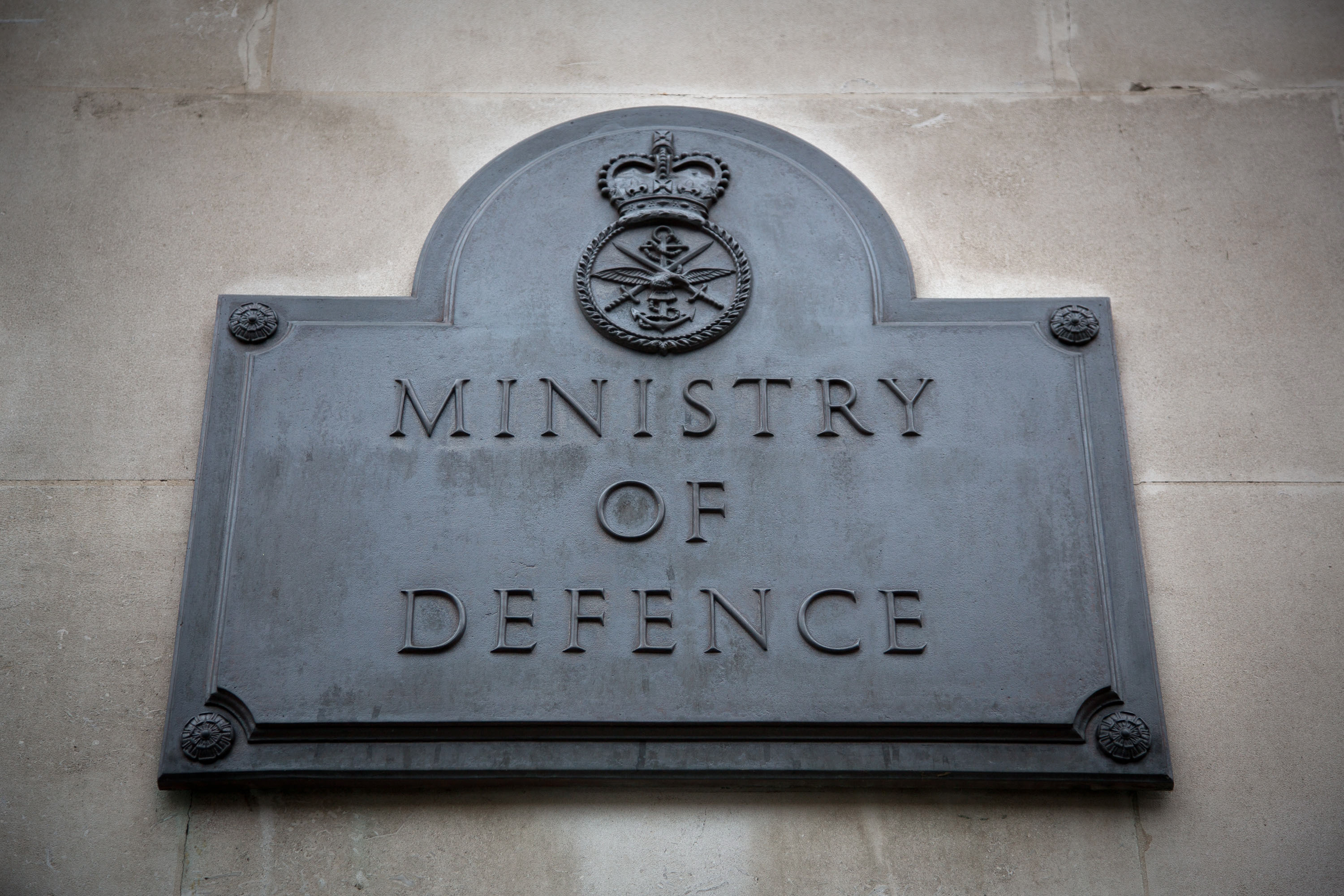
The Ministry of Defence plaque outside the south door of Main Building

In April 2002, whilst redevelopment was still under way, the National Audit Office (NAO) considered the extent to which the PFI contract was likely to deliver value for money and the effectiveness of MOD's management of the project. The NAO report was generally favourable and found that the contract would provide what the MOD wished to procure, that the benefits of the contract would be similar in cost to that estimated for conventional procurement (other factors had tipped the balance in favour of PFI) and that the management of the project had been good.

A subsequent report by the House of Commons Public Accounts Committee in January 2003 was less favourable. The committee was critical of the MOD's choice of PFI over other forms of procurement and considered that there was no guarantee that the contract, valued at £2.4 billion over its lifetime, will deliver value for money. The report also criticised the MOD for delays in concluding the final contract which resulted in increased costs and for poor forward planning, which resulted a separate deal being required to accommodate 500 additional staff in London.

== Architectural features ==
=== Architectural sculpture ===
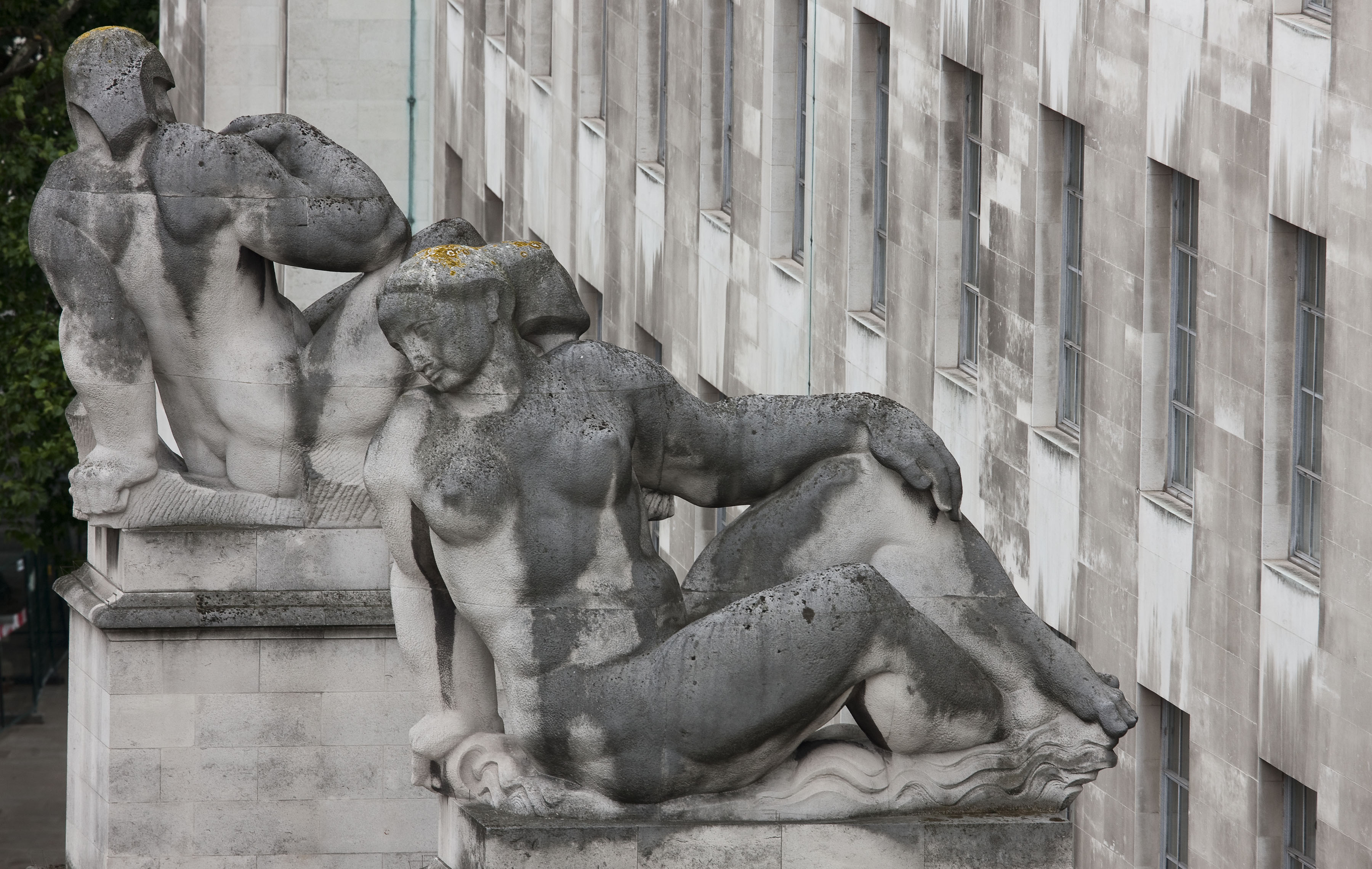
Earth and Water, located at the northern entrance.

The northern tetrastyle portico entrance to the building, on Horse Guards Avenue, is flanked by two large statues, Earth and Water, by the sculptor Sir Charles Wheeler. The figures weigh 40 tonnes each and cost £12,600. Similar figures representing "air" and "fire" were intended to be installed at the south end of the building; however, these were never constructed. During the 1950s, building staff nicknamed the statues "Mr and Mrs Parkinson", after Cyril Northcote Parkinson, the Board of Trade civil servant who devised Parkinson's Law which states "work expands so as to fill the time available for its completion". More recently MOD staff refer to the statues as the "Two Fat Ladies".

The badge of the RAF is carved into stone columns either side of the southern entrance to the building, reflecting its initial use by the Air Ministry. The badge, featuring an Eagle superimposed on a circlet which is surmounted by a crown, was sculpted by David McFall.

=== Statues ===
Several military statues exist in the grounds of the building or in close proximity.

- A statue of Major General Gordon of Khartoum dating from 1887 to 1888, sits at the Horse Guards Avenue end of Whitehall Gardens. The Grade II listed statue by Sir Hamo Thornycroft is made from bronze and sits on a Portland stone base.
- Marshal of the RAF Hugh Trenchard, 1st Viscount Trenchard (1873–1956) is commemorated by a 1961 bronze statue situated in Whitehall Gardens.
- The Royal Air Force Memorial dating from 1923 is located at the Whitehall Steps on Victoria Embankment. Designed by Sir Reginald Blomfield and sculpted by Sir William Reid Dick, the memorial is constructed from Portland stone and features a gilt bronze eagle.
- Whitehall Gardens features the Fleet Air Arm Memorial designed by James Butler. It was unveiled on 1 June 2000 by Charles, Prince of Wales.

=== Historic Rooms ===
Five rooms from buildings which were previously on the site were dismantled and incorporated into the building as conference rooms when the building was originally built. They are now known as the "Historic Rooms".

- Historic Room No.13 dates from around 1757 and was a reception room from Pembroke House. It features a decorative plaster ceiling with modillion cornicing. There is an Ionic columned and pilastered framed alcove and female mask keystone within the arch beneath entablature and flanking bays. There are 6-panel doors placed on circular panels.
- Historic Room No. 24 dates from 1757 and was also part of Pembroke House. It is similar to room no.13, but has an elaborated alcove opposite a bay window in three part arrangement with decorative doors on each side in a frame of fluted Ionic columns sitting on pedestals. There is a decorative plasterwork ceiling with spider's web design and modillion cornicing and a carved arabesque ornamented window shutter panels.
- Historic Room No. 25 is the former dining room from Pembroke House. It dates from 1773 and was designed by Sir William Chambers and features a decorated plasterwork ceiling and an elaborate chimneypiece designed by William Kent, which is believed to originate from Cadogan House.
- Historic Room No. 27 is the former saloon of Pembroke House and dates from 1760. It was also designed by Sir William Chambers and features an elaborate Palladian style compartmented plasterwork ceiling and Corinthian columned and pedimented doorway with carved detailing.
- Historic Room No. 79 was formerly part of Cromwell House and dates from around 1722. It is a completely panelled room with decorated modillion cornicing, the north wall featuring elaborated carved architrave central panel, the east wall has a formerly open three part pilastered arcade and an ornate carved pine chimneypiece. There are consoles supporting the mantle, carved with eagle heads and a pedimented overmantel.

== Facilities ==
Beneath Main Building is a three-storey bunker complex housing the Defence Crisis Management Centre (DCMC), otherwise known as "Pindar" after the ancient Greek poet. The DCMC provides the government with a protected crisis management facility. Government ministers, senior military and civilian personnel, service and civilian operational and support staff are allocated space within the complex. The DCMC cost £126.3 million to construct and fit-out and became operational on 7 December 1992.

== Security ==
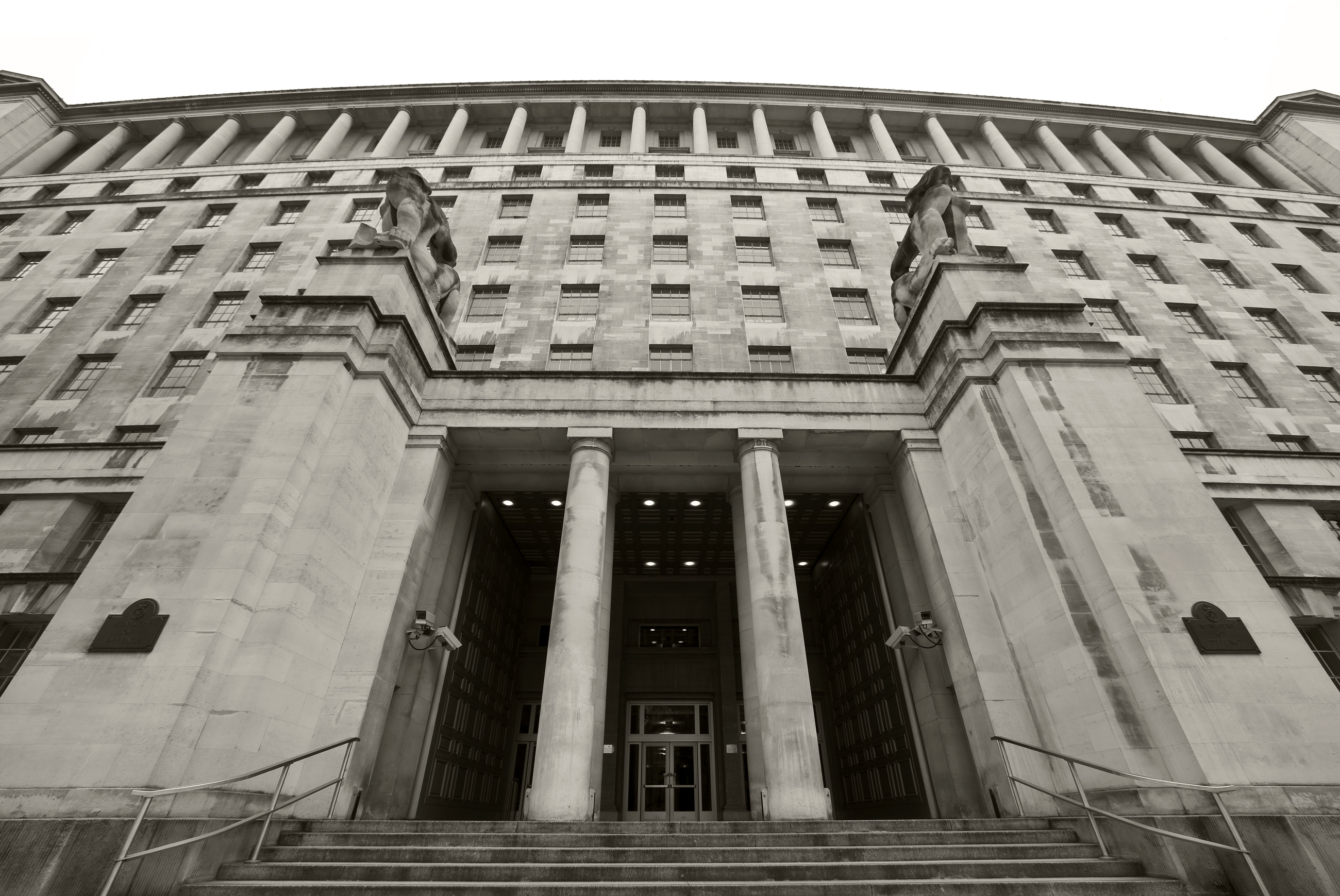
The northern entrance to Main Building

On 1 June 2007, the building was designated as a protected site for the purposes of Section 128 of the Serious Organised Crime and Police Act 2005. The effect of the act was to make it a specific criminal offence for a person to trespass into the building. The restriction also includes the wall and vehicle ramps on the west side of the building adjoining Whitehall Gardens and Raleigh Green; however, it does not include the steps, ramps and porticos that give access to the inside of the building.

In August 2016, The Times newspaper reported that the specialist armed unit of the Ministry of Defence Police which guards Main Building could cease to carry out such duties. The MOD would only confirm that it was reviewing security arrangements at Main Building.

Protestors from Palestine Action and Youth Demand sprayed red paint on the walls of the building on 10 April 2024. Several people were arrested on suspicion of criminal damage. The MOD estimated that it would cost at least £60,000 to remove the paint.
