= Pembroke House =

London residence of the earls of Pembroke

Coordinates: 51.5042°N 0.1247°W

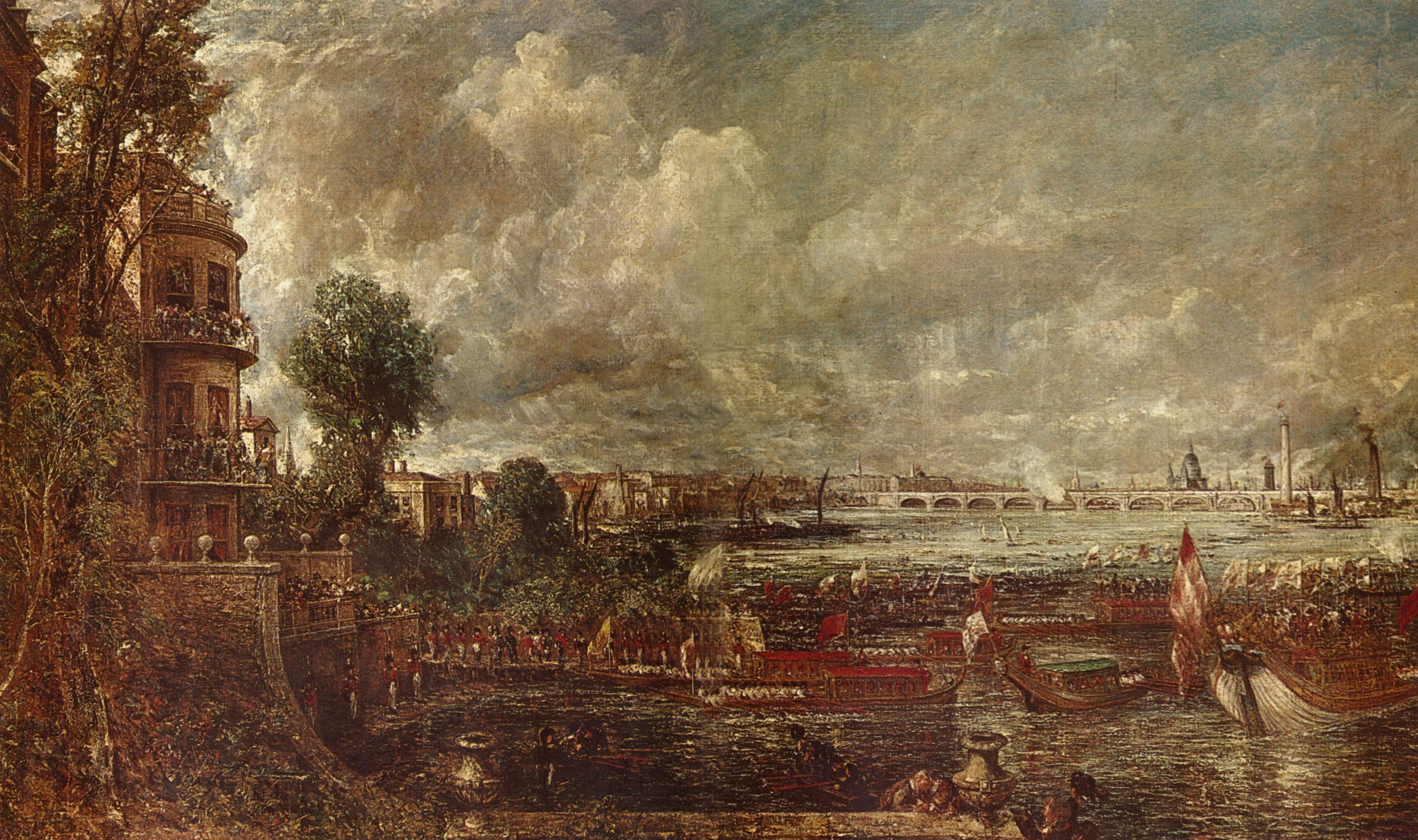
The Opening of Waterloo Bridge, 1832, by John Constable

Pembroke House, located on Whitehall, was the London residence of the earls of Pembroke.

== History ==
It was built by the architect earl Henry Herbert in 1723–24 (under Colen Campbell and latterly his assistant Roger Morris), on ground leased by the earl in 1717 and 1729 amidst the ruins of the parts of Whitehall Palace that burned down in 1698 (and still covered in its rubble). Its design may have inspired the 9th earl's designs for Marble Hill House. The 9th earl died here in 1733, as did his great-grandson the 11th Earl, in 1827.

It was the subject of a major rebuild by the 10th Earl in 1756–59, and in 1762 Lady Hervey wrote that it was "taken for the Duc de Nivernois, the French Ambassador". Gardens were created in 1818 by demolishing the house's riding-house and stables, and the main floor-level terrace (including the portion over the water-gate) was retained. The lease was repeatedly renewed (passing to Dudley Stanhope, 9th Earl of Harrington) until in or around 1853, when the land and house became crown freehold (housing the Ministry of Transport c.1930, (Note: An accident report held by the Railways Archive for an incident at Wapping station in 1921, shows the Ministry of Transport being based at 7 Whitehall Gardens, London S.W. 1. According to British History Online, this is the address of Pembroke House suggesting it was being used as government offices.) and later parts of what would become the Ministry of Defence). It was demolished to build the Ministry of Defence main building in 1938. Several buildings nearby were also demolished to permit this development. Some of the rooms from Pembroke House survive as 'Historic Rooms' within the MOD building.

== See also ==
- List of demolished buildings and structures in London

== Bibliography ==
- Steven Brindle, 'Pembroke House, Whitehall', in The Georgian Group Journal, vol. VIII, 1998, pp. 88–113.
- 'Pembroke House', Survey of London: volume 13: St Margaret, Westminster, part II: Whitehall I (1930), pp. 167-179.
- 'Whitehall: Precinct and gardens', Old and New London: Volume 3 (1878), pp. 376-382.
