= Horse Guards Avenue =

Street in the City of Westminster, London

Coordinates: 51.5049°N 0.1249°W

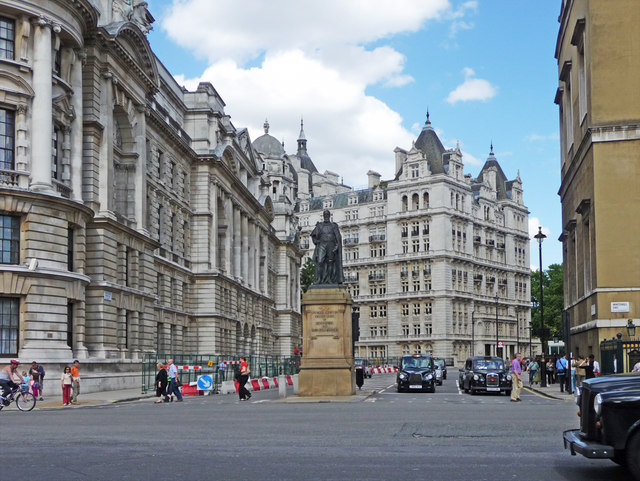
- Horse Guards Avenue from Whitehall
- Interactive map of Horse Guards Avenue
- East end: Victoria Embankment
- West end: Whitehall

Horse Guards Avenue is a road in the City of Westminster, London, linking the major thoroughfares of Whitehall and Victoria Embankment, to the east of the Horse Guards building and parade area. The entrance to the Main Building of the Ministry of Defence (MoD), flanked by its monumental Earth and Water statues, opens onto Horse Guards Avenue. A statue of a Gurkha soldier, unveiled in 1997, stands as a memorial in front of the Ministry of Defence building.

== History ==
Horse Guards Avenue falls entirely within the area once occupied by the Palace of Whitehall, which was almost completely destroyed by fire in 1698, save for the now historic listed building, Banqueting House. It was originally a narrow street called Whitehall Yard on which stood a number of houses, most notably Carrington House, the residence of Lord Carrington. The area was cleared in 1896 to make room for the widening of the street preparatory to the construction of the War Office building. The avenue was planned as part of a subsequent project to build a large government building, begun in 1909 but not completed until 1951. On completion, the avenue formed the northern boundary of this new building, which has been used as the Main Building of the Ministry of Defence (MoD) since 1964.

== Road layout ==
Horse Guards Avenue, running from west to east, connects the major north–south thoroughfares of Whitehall and Embankment. Beginning at a T junction with Whitehall at a point opposite the Horse Guards building, the avenue continues eastward to another T junction on Embankment. Approximately 600 feet (180 m) long, it provides for a single lane of widely separated traffic in each direction, with a slight curve bowing its course to the north midway along.

Other than Whitehall and the Embankment, the only other public road connecting with Horse Guards Avenue is Whitehall Court, a one way road joining the avenue from the north as another T-Junction, midway along its length. A small private access road, Whitehall Gardens, is located at its western end, running south. Horse Guards Road is not connected to Horse Guards Avenue, being approximately 700 feet (210 m) away beyond the Horse Guards building and parade ground.

== Adjoining buildings ==
Horse Guards Avenue is overlooked by four buildings – the MoD Main Building and Banqueting House on the south side, separated by Whitehall Gardens, and the Old War Office Building and Whitehall Court on the north side, separated by Whitehall Court road. The north frontage of the MoD building and its entrance dominates the south side of the avenue, with the smaller Banqueting House situated to the west in the corner with Whitehall. To the north, the Old War Office Building lies on the west side of Whitehall Court road fronting onto Whitehall, while the Whitehall Court building lies on the opposite side. Towards Embankment, the frontages of both the Whitehall Court building and the MoD building end at the same place, with Horse Guards Avenue continuing on to the junction with Embankment through the public gardens that line the west side of Embankment.

== Other landmarks ==
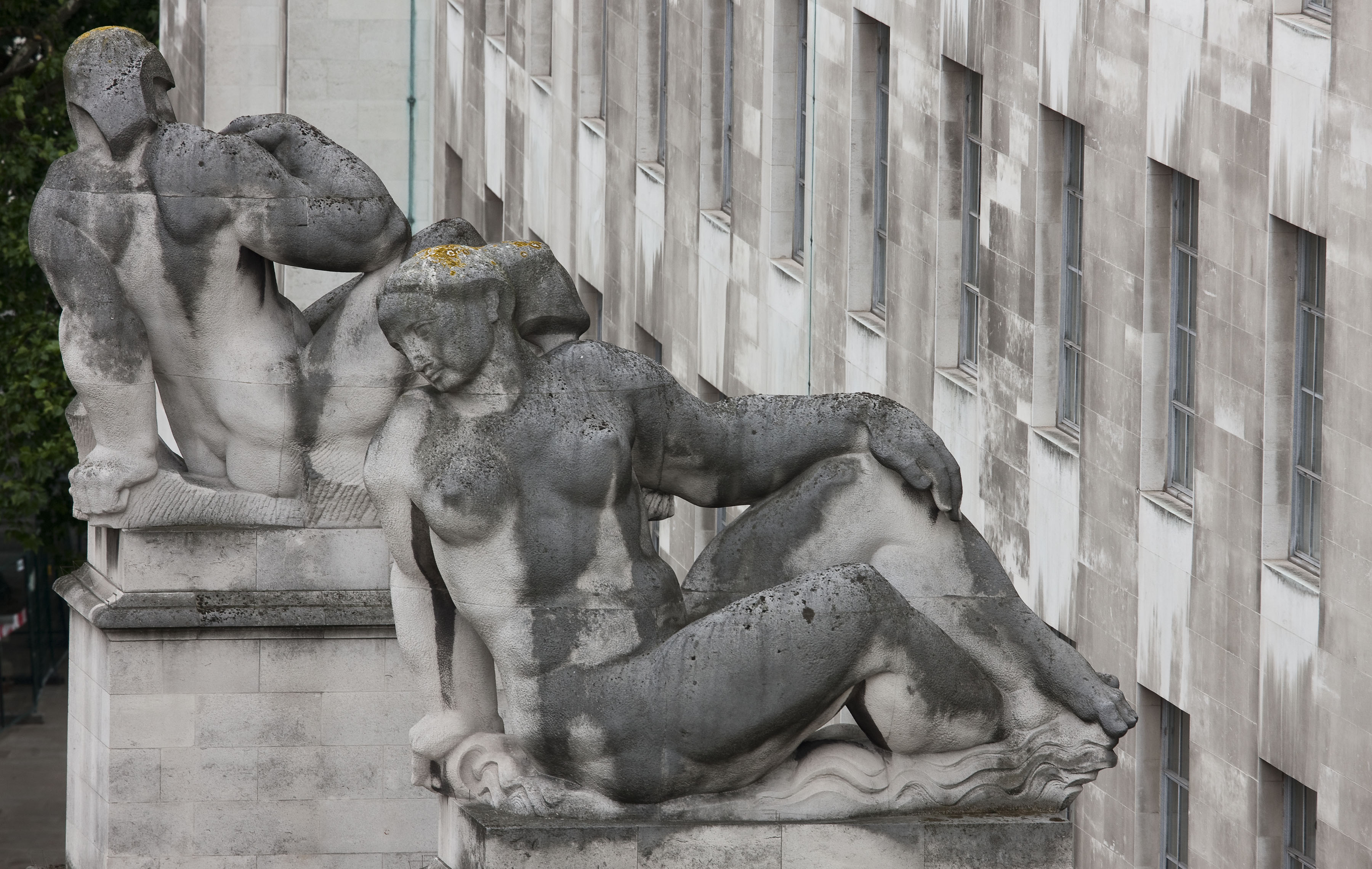
Charles Wheeler's architectural sculptures of Earth and Water

A statue of Spencer Cavendish, 8th Duke of Devonshire by Herbert Hampton stands in the middle of the Avenue at the Whitehall end, facing Horse Guards. Opposite the MoD building entrance stands the Gurkha Monument, on the corner of the avenue and Whitehall Court road, with the soldier statue facing west looking towards Whitehall. Sculpted by Philip Jackson, it was unveiled in 1997 by Queen Elizabeth II. The entrance to the MoD building itself is flanked by two monumental statues, Earth and Water, by Charles Wheeler.

== IRA mortar attack ==
Horse Guards Avenue was the launch site of the IRA's 1991 Downing Street mortar attack. A transit van was parked on the Avenue near the corner with Whitehall, and the mortar launch occurred minutes later. The incident led to a ban on street parking in the area.
