= Henry Herbert, 9th Earl of Pembroke =

English peer and courtier

Lieutenant-General The Right Honourable The Earl of Pembroke PC DL FRS
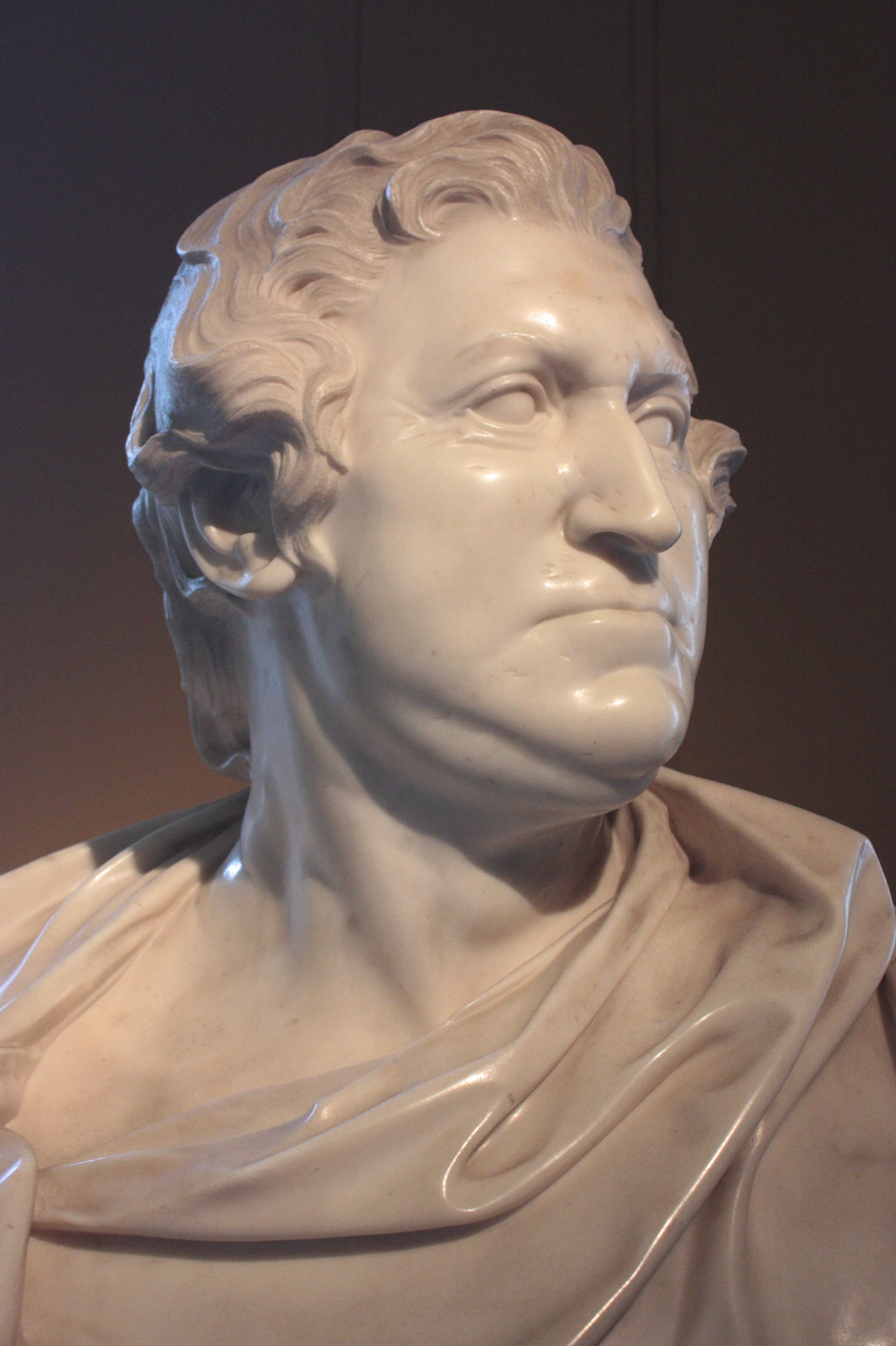
- Bust by Louis-François Roubiliac, c. 1747, Victoria and Albert Museum
- Born: Henry Herbert, Lord Herbert; 29 January 1693
- Died: 9 January 1749 (aged 55) Pembroke House, London, England
- Spouse: Mary Fitzwilliam
- Children: Henry Herbert, 10th Earl of Pembroke

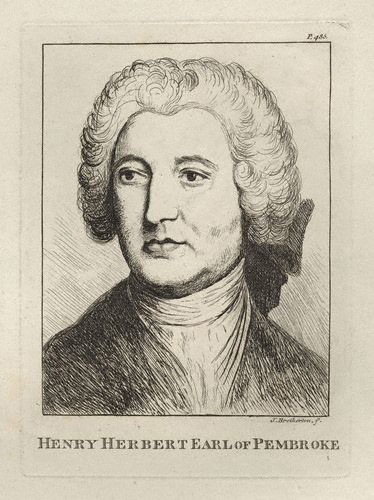
The Earl of Pembroke

Lieutenant-General Henry Herbert, 9th Earl of Pembroke, 6th Earl of Montgomery, PC, FRS (29 January 1693 – 9 January 1749) was an English peer and courtier. He was the heir and eldest son of Thomas Herbert, 8th Earl of Pembroke and his first wife Margaret Sawyer. He was styled Lord Herbert from birth until he inherited his father's earldoms of Pembroke and Montgomery in 1733. He also became Lord of the bedchamber to King George II of the House of Hanover.

== Life ==
Studying at Christ Church, Oxford up to 1705 in a milieu of classicist architecture (its dean, Henry Aldrich, was then at work on his Elementa architecturae and on overseeing construction of the Peckwater quadrangle, Palladian before Palladianism was popular in England) he went on a grand tour in 1712 (meeting Lord Shaftesbury in Naples, William Kent in Rome, and also going to Venice).

He was appointed lord of the bedchamber to George II during his time as the prince of Wales. He was made a deputy lieutenant of Worcestershire on 29 January 1715, and was commissioned captain & lieutenant-colonel in the Coldstream Guards on 12 August 1717. On 20 September 1721, he was promoted to the rank of colonel, and made captain & colonel of the 1st Troop of Horse Guards.

Upon the accession of George II in 1727, Herbert remained his close associate, and was made first lord of the bedchamber. After acceding to the earldom on 9 January 1733, Pembroke left the Horse Guards and was appointed colonel of The King's Own Regiment of Horse (22 June 1733). Later that year (24 August), he was appointed Lord Lieutenant of Wiltshire. George II continued to favour Pembroke, who was appointed groom of the stole on 8 January 1735 and sworn a Privy Councillor the next day. However, he proved unsuccessful in his attempts to mediate between George and his son prince Frederick. Though he exercised powerful patronage in Wilton, his local constituency, Pembroke played only a slight role in national politics.

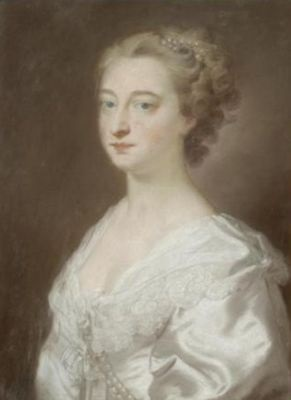
William Hoare of Bath's portrait, For Lord Pembroke at Whitehall, of Mary FitzWilliam, wife of 9th earl of Pembroke, circa 1738.

He shared his father's antiquarian tastes (commissioning Andrew Fountaine to supervise the cataloguing of his father's collections), but expressed them through architecture rather than collecting. He is known to have designed seven buildings, two of which are no longer standing, these are the Earl's own house, Pembroke House, Whitehall of 1717, demolished 1756-7 and Wimbledon House 1732–3, Surrey for the Duchess of Marlborough, burnt down in 1785. Opinions of his talents in that area were mixed – Horace Walpole stated that "no man had a purer taste in building" but Sarah, Duchess of Marlborough wrote that the Earl's talent was little more than to "imitate ill whatever was useless" in Inigo Jones and Palladio's buildings Although he designed the Column of Victory at Blenheim Palace erect 1727–30 for the Duchess of Marlborough as a memorial to her late husband. As one of the "architect earls", he collaborated with Roger Morris to design Marble Hill House (1724–29), the White Lodge, Richmond (1727–28), and the Palladian Bridge over the little River Nadder at Wilton House (1736/7). He also designed the water tower at Houghton Hall (c.1730) in the form of a garden temple, with a pedimented portico raised on a high rusticated base.

The mason William Townsend executed the Earl's design for the Column of Victory, at Blenheim Palace and the water tower at Houghton Hall. The Earl also inspected Townsend's design of Westcombe House, Blackheath, Kent (1727–28) and as well as parts of the design of Castle Hill, Devon (1729). He also redecorated a few of the rooms in the south front of Wilton House. Though he was uninvolved in its design, he also acted as an energetic promoter of the project to build Westminster Bridge, getting the relevant Act of Parliament through in 1738, laying the first stone in January 1739 (and the last stone of the main structure in 1747), attending 120 meetings of the bridge commissioners (the last on the morning of his death), and consistently supporting its designer Charles Labelye and his caisson design against long and fierce opposition (after the subsidence of one pier in 1747, The Downfall of Westminster Bridge, or, My Lord in the Suds mocked him for this support, but he was ultimately vindicated).

Lord Pembroke enjoyed swimming, played tennis every day, generally remained continually active and healthy, and (as seen in Roubiliac's portrait bust of him at Wilton) was strong and powerfully built. He seems to have developed asthma (Walpole mentions this in his detailed account of the Earl's death) and spent some weeks at Bath in winter 1743, during which he experienced breathing difficulties. Pembroke was promoted lieutenant-general on 18 February 1742, and became a Fellow of the Royal Society on 15 December 1743. During the king's trip to Hanover in 1748, he served as one of the Lord Justices. He died at Pembroke House in 1750.

== Diet ==
Herbert attempted to live on a diet of only beetroot and watercress which he kept in a bag wig used as a knapsack. In 1729, he was seen walking the streets of Paris with his bag wig eating beetroot and watercress at regular intervals. He nearly died because of the diet.

He has been described as a "pioneer vegetarian" and a "proto-vegan". James Lees-Milne noted that Herbert "became a fanatical vegetarian to the extent of practically starving himself to death."

== Marriage and issue ==
He and Mary FitzWilliam (eldest daughter of Richard FitzWilliam, 5th Viscount FitzWilliam and Frances Shelley), married on 28 August 1733. They only had one child, Henry, who inherited his father's earldoms. When the Fitzwilliam family died out in the male line in 1833, the Pembroke family inherited large estates in Dublin; they are still substantial landowners there.

== Gallery of architectural works ==
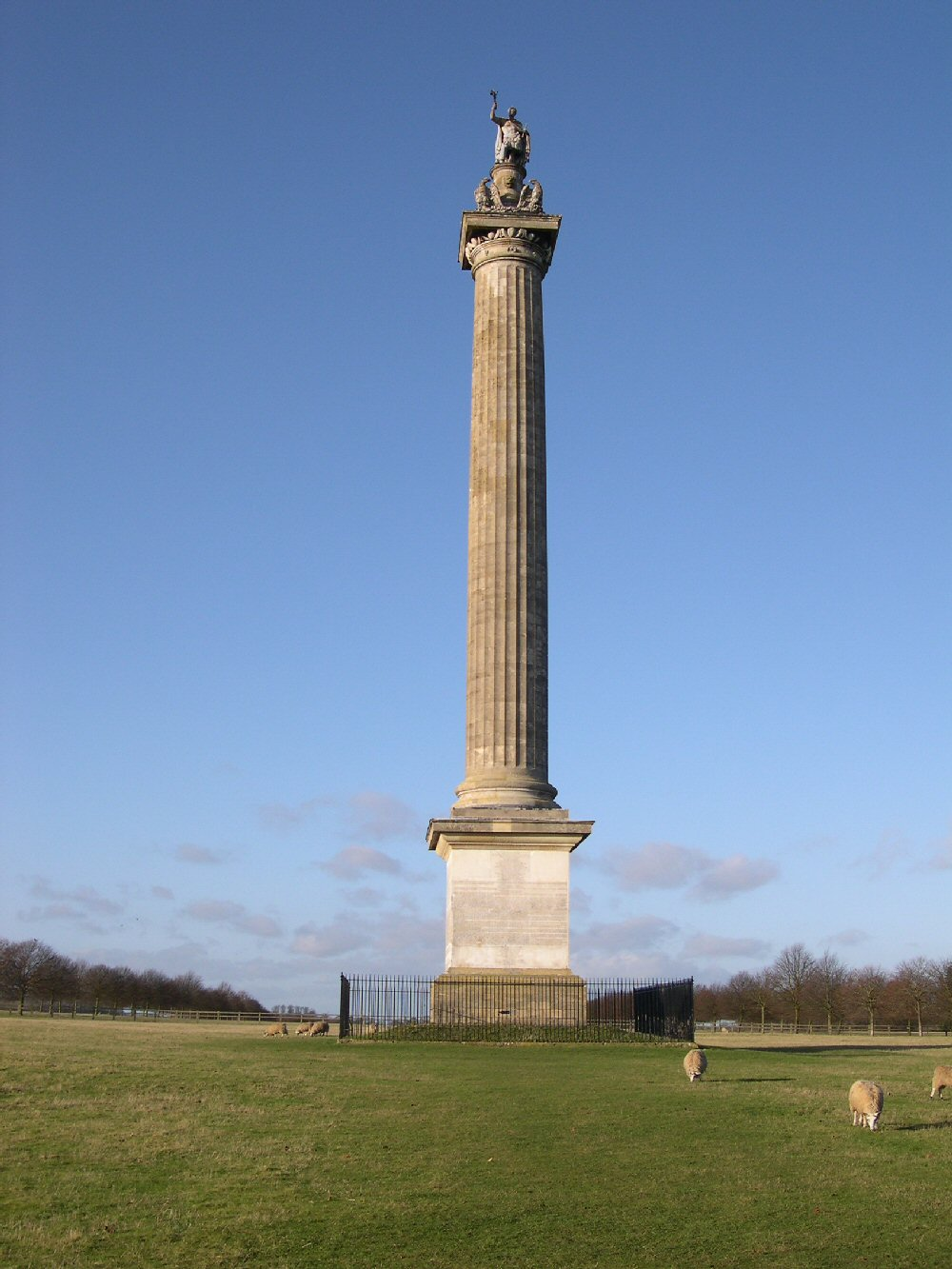
Column of Victory, Blenheim Palace

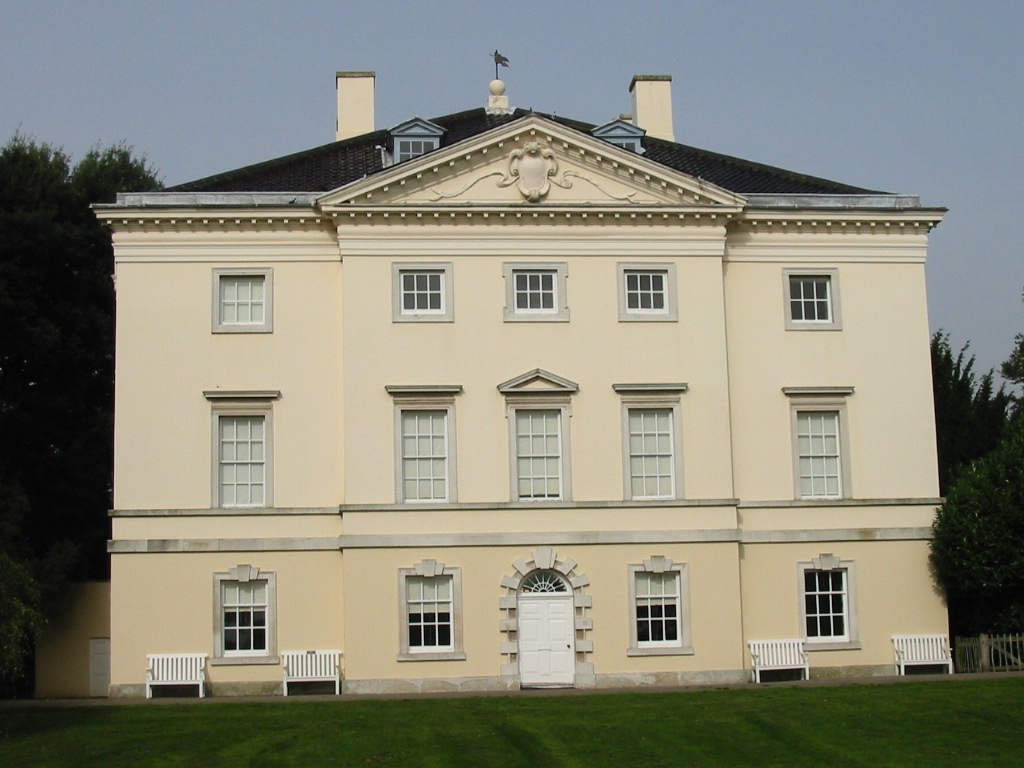
Marble Hill House

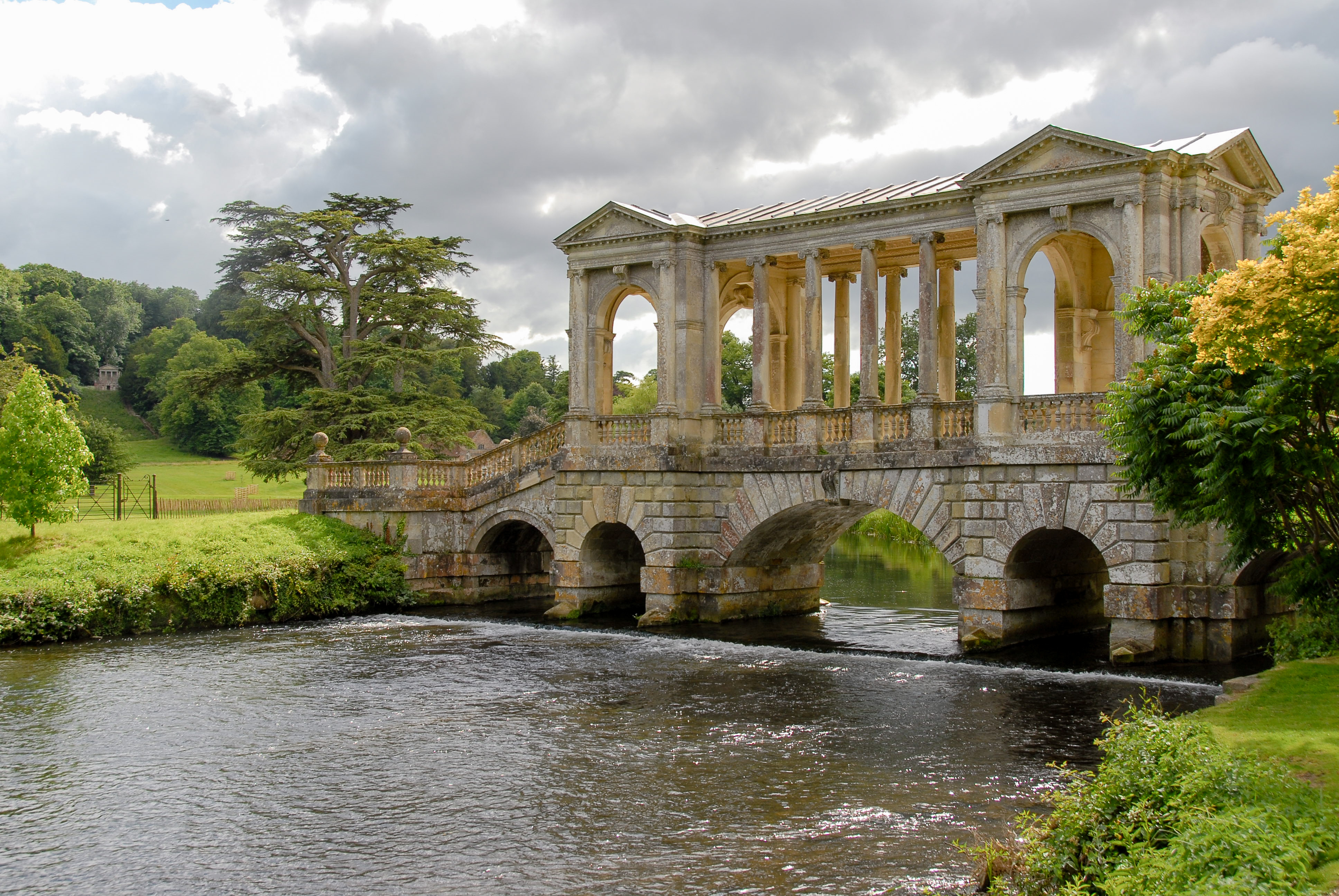
Palladian bridge

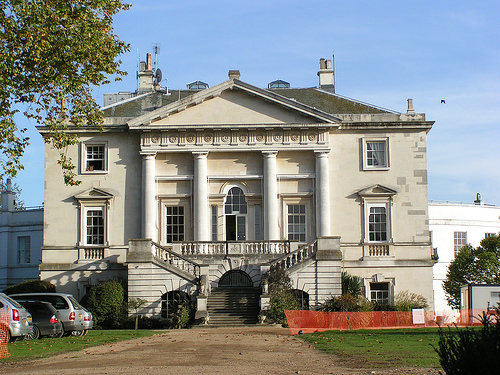
White Lodge

Military offices
Preceded by The Duke of Montagu	Captain and Colonel of His Majesty's Own Troop of Horse Guards; 1721–1733	Succeeded by The Lord Catherlough
Preceded by The Viscount Cobham	Colonel of The King's Own Regiment of Horse; 1733–1743	Succeeded by Sir Philip Honywood
Court offices
Preceded by The Earl of Godolphin	Groom of the Stole; 1735–1750	Succeeded by The Earl of Albemarle
Honorary titles
Preceded by The Earl of Yarmouth	Lord Lieutenant of Wiltshire; 1733–1750	Succeeded by Robert Sawyer Herbert
Peerage of England
Preceded by Thomas Herbert	Earl of Pembroke; Earl of Montgomery; 1733–1750	Succeeded by Henry Herbert
