= Submarine Delivery Agency =

The Submarine Delivery Agency (SDA) is an executive agency of the Ministry of Defence and is responsible for the procurement, in-service support and disposal of the UK Government's nuclear submarines.

The SDA was created in April 2018 to manage the delivery of two submarine replacement programmes:

- The Aukus-class submarine, a fleet submarine developed jointly with Australia as the successor to the Astute-class submarine.
- The Dreadnought-class submarine, a ballistic missile submarine as the successor to the Vanguard-class submarine.
