= Ministry of Defence (United Kingdom) =

UK Government department responsible for defence

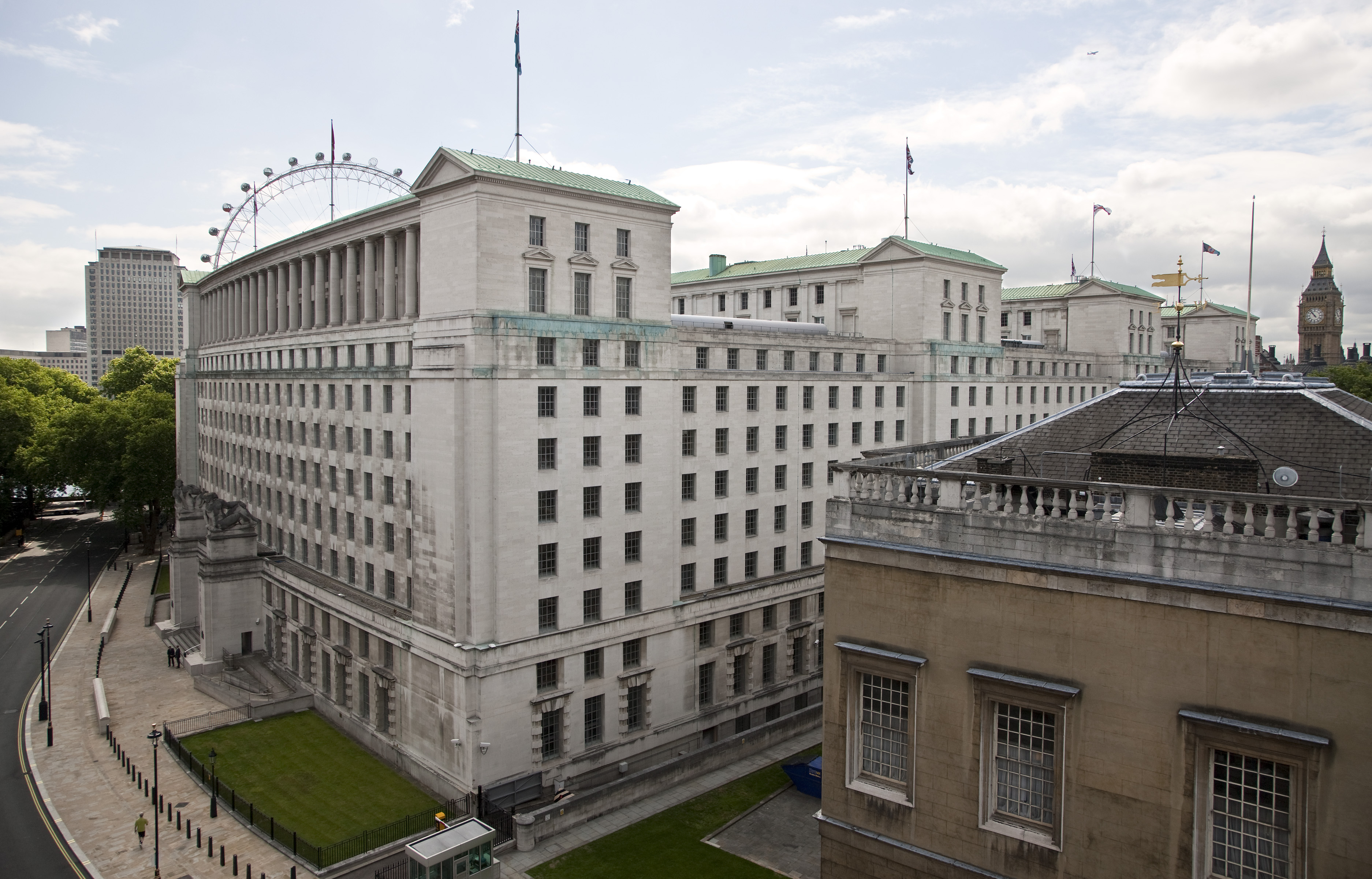
- MoD Main Building, Westminster

Department overview
- Formed: 1 April 1964 (as modern department)
- Jurisdiction: Government of the United Kingdom
- Headquarters: Main Building, Whitehall, Westminster, London; 51°30′14″N 0°07′30″W
- Employees: 55,351 (FTE) civilian staff (April 2026); 182,980 military personnel (July 2026)
- Annual budget: £66 bn GBP FY 2026 ($90 bn USD)
- Secretary of State responsible: Wes Streeting, Secretary of State for Defence
- Department executives: Air Chief Marshal Sir Richard Knighton, Chief of the Defence Staff; Jeremy Pocklington, Permanent Secretary
- Child agencies: Defence Equipment and Support; Defence Science and Technology Laboratory; Submarine Delivery Agency; United Kingdom Hydrographic Office
- Website: gov.uk/mod

The Ministry of Defence (MOD or MoD) is a ministerial department of the Government of the United Kingdom. It is responsible for implementing the defence policy set by the government and serves as the headquarters of the British Armed Forces.

Its principal objectives are to defend the United Kingdom of Great Britain and Northern Ireland and its interests, promote national interests globally and to strengthen international peace and stability. The MOD also manages day-to-day running of the armed forces, contingency planning and defence procurement.

The expenditure, administration and policy of the MOD are scrutinised by the Defence Select Committee, except for Defence Intelligence which instead falls under the Intelligence and Security Committee of Parliament.

The Ministry of Defence has been involved in commercial activities; an example of which is their 2025 announcement to supply Norway with warships, the UK's largest warship export deal by value.

== History ==
During the 1920s and 1930s, British civil servants and politicians, looking back at the performance of the state during the First World War, concluded that there was a need for greater co-ordination between the three services that made up the armed forces of the United Kingdom: the Royal Navy, the British Army and the Royal Air Force. The formation of a united ministry of defence was rejected by the coalition government of David Lloyd George in 1921, but the Chiefs of Staff Committee was formed in 1923, for the purposes of inter-service co-ordination. As rearmament became a concern during the 1930s, Stanley Baldwin created the position of Minister for Co-ordination of Defence. Ernle Chatfield, 1st Baron Chatfield held the post until the fall of the Chamberlain government in 1940. His success was limited by his lack of control over the existing Service departments, and his lack of political influence.

On forming his government in 1940, Winston Churchill created the office of Minister of Defence, to exercise ministerial control over the Chiefs of Staff Committee and to co-ordinate defence matters. The post was held by the Prime Minister of the day until Clement Attlee's government introduced the Ministry of Defence Act of 1946. After 1946, the three posts of Secretary of State for War, First Lord of the Admiralty, and Secretary of State for Air were formally subordinated to the new Minister of Defence, who had a seat in the Cabinet. The three service ministers – Admiralty, War, Air – remained in direct operational control of their respective services, but ceased to attend Cabinet.

From 1946 to 1964, five Departments of State did the work of the modern Ministry of Defence: the Admiralty, the War Office, the Air Ministry, the Ministry of Aviation, and an earlier form of the Ministry of Defence. The Ministry of Supply existed from 1939 to 1959. Those departments merged in 1964, and the defence functions of the Ministry of Aviation Supply were merged into the Ministry of Defence in 1971. Thereafter the MoD Procurement Executive was established as a separate organisation to supervise all military procurement. The unification of all defence activities under a single ministry was motivated by a desire to curb interservice rivalries and followed the precedent set by the American National Security Act of 1947.

=== Fraud ===
The most notable fraud conviction has been that of Gordon Foxley, Director of Ammunition Procurement at the Ministry of Defence from 1981 to 1984. Police claimed he received at least £3.5m in total in corrupt payments, such as substantial bribes from overseas arms contractors aiming to influence the allocation of contracts.

=== Germ and chemical warfare tests ===
A government report covered by The Guardian newspaper in 2002 indicated that between 1940 and 1979, the Ministry of Defence "turned large parts of the country into a giant laboratory to conduct a series of secret germ warfare tests on the public" and many of these tests "involved releasing potentially dangerous chemicals and micro-organisms over vast swathes of the population without the public being told." The Ministry of Defence claims that these trials were to simulate germ warfare and that the tests were harmless. However, families who have been in the area of many of the tests are experiencing children with birth defects and physical and mental handicaps and many are asking for a public inquiry. The report estimated these tests affected millions of people, including during one period between 1961 and 1968 where "more than a million people along the south coast of England, from Torquay to the New Forest, were exposed to bacteria including E.coli and Bacillus globigii, which mimics anthrax." Two scientists commissioned by the Ministry of Defence stated that these trials posed no risk to the public. This was confirmed by Sue Ellison, a representative of the Defence Science and Technology Laboratory at Porton Down who said that the results from these trials "will save lives, should the country or our forces face an attack by chemical and biological weapons."

=== Civil action ===
In February 2019, former soldier Inoke Momonakaya won £458,000 payout after a legal battle for the racial harassment and bullying he received while serving in the army. In August 2019, A Commons Defence Select Committee report revealed that several female and BAME military staff have raised concerns regarding discrimination, bullying and harassment. In September 2019, two former British army soldiers Nkululeko Zulu and Hani Gue won a racial discrimination claim against the Ministry of Defence (MoD). In November 2019, mixed race soldier Mark De Kretser sued MoD for £100k claiming he was subjected to "grindingly repetitive" racist taunts from colleagues.

=== Territorial Army cuts ===
In October 2009, the MOD was heavily criticised for withdrawing the bi-annual non-operational training £20m budget for the Territorial Army (TA), ending all non-operational training for six months until April 2010. The government eventually backed down and restored the funding. The TA provides a small percentage of the UK's operational troops. Its members train on weekly evenings and monthly weekends, as well as two-week exercises generally annually and occasionally bi-annually for troops doing other courses. The cuts would have meant a significant loss of personnel and would have had adverse effects on recruitment.

=== Overspending ===
In 2013, it was found that the Ministry of Defence had overspent on its equipment budget by £6.5bn on orders that could take up to 39 years to fulfil. The Ministry of Defence has been criticised in the past for poor management and financial control. Specific examples of overspending include:

- Eight Boeing Chinook HC3 were ordered in 1995 as dedicated special forces helicopters. The aircraft were to cost £259 million and the forecast in-service date was November 1998. However, although delivered in 2001, the Mk3 could not receive airworthiness certificates as it was not possible to certify the avionics software, and would not enter service until 2017. The procurement was described by Edward Leigh, then Chairman of the Public Accounts Committee, as "one of the most incompetent procurements of all time" and the National Audit Office (NAO) issued a scathing report on the affair, stating that the whole programme was likely to cost £500 million.
- In 2010, the Nimrod MRA4 maritime patrol aircraft procurement was cancelled after £3.4 billion had been spent on the programme. In addition there were termination costs which were not disclosed. In January 2011 it was reported by the Financial Times that when the decision was taken to scrap the aircraft, "[it] was still riddled with flaws".
- Failure to manage stocks of supplies and spare parts, resulting in excess inventory being held. The NAO raised concerns about inventory management from 1991 onwards, but a Committee of MPs argued in 2013 that "the root causes of the problem [had] not been addressed". MoD officials accepted that the department had "much to do" but informed MPs that "it has already introduced its own internal control measures to prevent over-ordering of inventory, some of which are showing early signs of success". The Department told the MPs that it was "on track to reduce spending on inventory by £300 million in 2012–13, and that it [planned] to reduce it by £500 million a year within the next three years".

Following the 2025 Strategic Defence Review, which suggested increased spending and large changes to the armed forces particularly toward autonomous weapons, the Defence Investment Plan, expected in autumn 2025, was delayed amid warnings that there was a £28 billion funding gap over the next four years.

Spending on renewing the continuous at sea nuclear deterrent and other nuclear submarine programmes through the Defence Nuclear Enterprise is projected to increase to between 20% and 25% of the MOD budget in the late 2020s, putting cost pressure on other spending.

=== Hacking ===
In May 2024, the ministry's payroll system was reportedly targeted multiple times in a cyberattack in which personnel and their bank details were compromised. While initial reports attributed the cyberattack to China, the Defence Secretary Grant Shapps said it would take some time to conclude who was to blame.

== Ministerial team ==
The Ministers in the Ministry of Defence are as follows, with cabinet ministers in bold:

Minister	Portrait	Office	Portfolio
Wes Streeting MP		Secretary of State for Defence	Strategic policy and operational oversight including as a member of the National Security Council; Nuclear deterrent (CASD) and operations policy and enterprise; Strategic overview of the Strategic Defence Review Implementation and Defence Investment Plan; Defence budget; Euro-Atlantic strategy and planning; Defence strategy, planning, programme, and resource allocation; Relationships with strategic international partners: US, France, Germany, Australia, Ukraine; One Defence Reform Programme; Oversight of Veterans; Service Personnel deaths on duty and letters of condolence; Strategic multilateral programmes – AUKUS and GCAP; Regulatory functions; Support on Afghan Inquiry
Luke Pollard MP		Minister of State for Defence Readiness and Industry	Implementation of relevant SDR Vision and Recommendations; oversight of the National Armaments Director Group; departmental communications strategy and reform; armed forces readiness and stockpiles; Defence procurement, including reform and UK Defence Innovation; submarine delivery; Defence Industrial Strategy implementation and growth; Defence Exports Campaign and Office; Defence Readiness Bill; Ukraine support - military aid and industrial partnerships, including HIRST and KINDRED; Defence industry relationships and the Defence Industrial Joint Council; acquisition reform/UK Defence Innovation; climate change and sustainability; Defence estates, accommodation and Defence Infrastructure Organisation; artificial intelligence and innovation; science and technology; Defence Afghanistan Relocation and Assistance Programme (ARAP) including eligibility applications and asylum; oversight of Parliamentary engagement
Vernon Coaker, Baron Coaker		Minister of State for Defence	Corporate governance including transformation programme; single departmental plan, risk reporting and health, safety and security; EU relations, including Brexit (excluding No Deal planning); engagement with retired senior Defence personnel and wider opinion formers; arms control and counter-proliferation, including strategic export licensing and chemical and biological weapons; UK Hydrographic Office; Statutory Instrument programme; Australia, Asia and Far East defence engagement; Defence Fire and Rescue; safety and security; Scotland, Wales and Northern Ireland devolved authorities; ship wrecks, museums and heritage; Ministry of Defence Police; ministerial correspondence and PQs
Captain Louise Sandher-Jones MP		Parliamentary Under-Secretary of State for the Armed Forces	Implementation of relevant SDR Vision and Recommendations; oversight of Military Strategic Headquarters (MSHQ); legislation (including Armed Forces Bill); Northern Ireland Legacy; Ukraine support – operations; autonomy and drones, including Drone Centre of Excellence; Force Posture and Deployment; Intelligence; Global Operational policy and commitments; North Atlantic Treaty Organisation (NATO) operations and planning; crisis response; Permanent Joint Operational Bases and Overseas Bases (including Cyprus, Falkland Islands and Gibraltar); Military Aid to Civilian Authority (MACA); Homeland Defence; UN Peacekeeping and Human Security Call Out Orders; Overseas Security and Justice Assistance Reports
Wing Commander Calvin Bailey MP		Parliamentary Under-Secretary of State for Veterans and People	Implementation of relevant SDR Vision and Recommendations; recruitment and renewing the contract between the nation and those who serve; Veterans policy and delivery (including VALOUR); Office for Veterans Affairs; Armed Forces Commissioner; Armed Forces People and Families; civilian workforce (including RFA); Defence Business Services (including legal, pensions and compensation); Armed Forces Covenant; retention and incentivisation, including training skills and development; Service resettlement and transition; Reserves; Cadets; Defence culture – including oversight of the Raising our Standards Programme and Equality, Diversity and Inclusion; Armed Forces Parliamentary Scheme; Service Justice System and Service Complaints

== Senior military officials ==
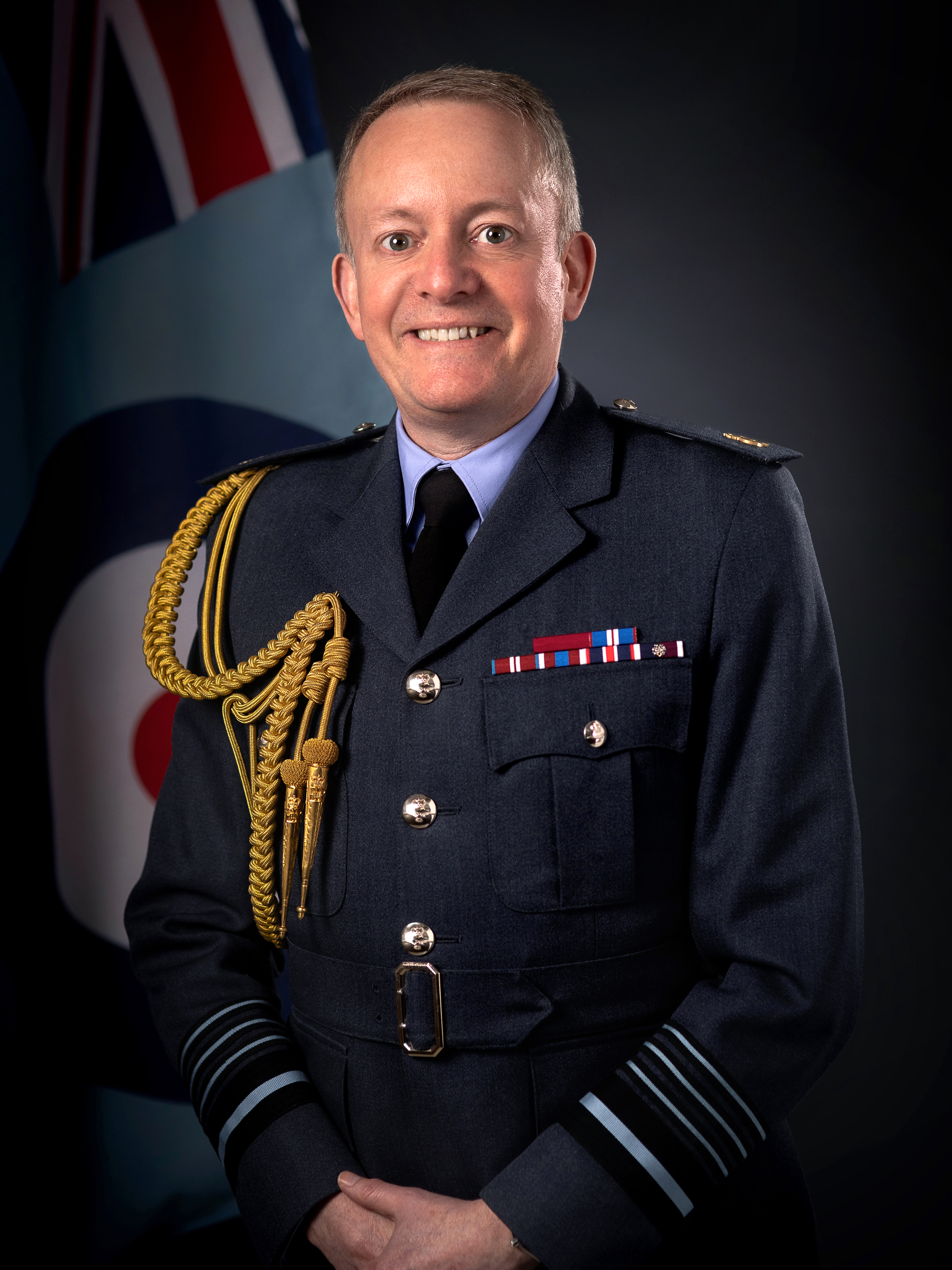
Air Chief Marshal Sir Rich Knighton, Chief of the Defence Staff since September 2025

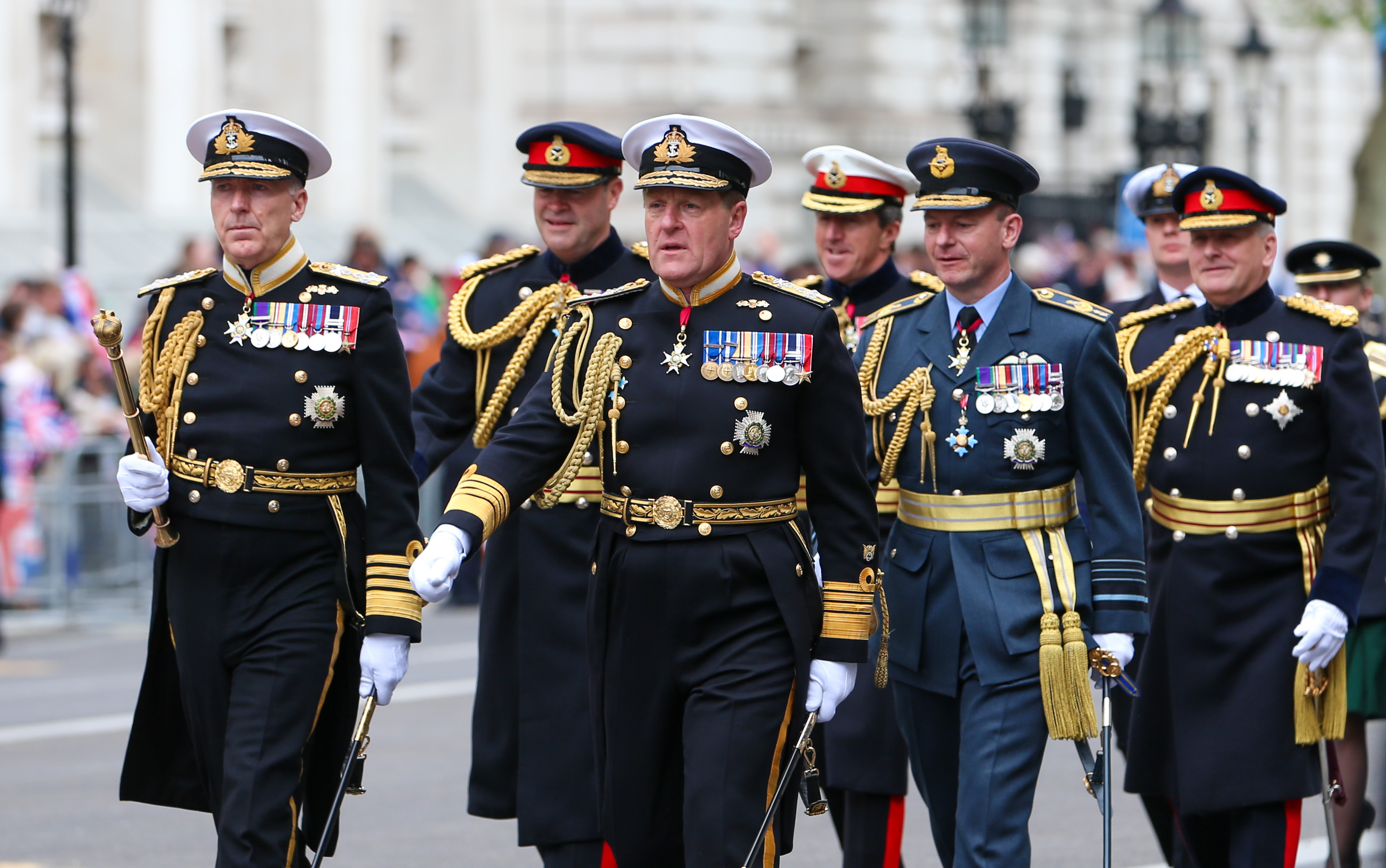
Defence chiefs at the Coronation of Charles III in 2023

=== Chiefs of the Defence Staff ===
The Chief of the Defence Staff (CDS) is the professional head of the British Armed Forces and the most senior uniformed military adviser to the Secretary of State for Defence and the Prime Minister.

The CDS is supported by the Vice Chief of the Defence Staff (VCDS) who deputises and is responsible for the day-to-day running of the armed services aspect of the MOD through the Central Staff, working closely alongside the Permanent Secretary. They are joined by the professional heads of the three British armed services (Royal Navy, British Army and Royal Air Force) and the Commander of Strategic Command. All personnel sit at OF-9 rank in the NATO rank system.

Together the Chiefs of Staff form the Chiefs of Staff Committee with responsibility for providing advice on operational military matters and the preparation and conduct of military operations.

The current Chiefs of Staff are as follows.

- Chief of the Defence Staff – Air Chief Marshal Sir Richard Knighton
- Vice-Chief of the Defence Staff – General Dame Sharon Nesmith
- First Sea Lord and Chief of the Naval Staff – General Sir Gwyn Jenkins
- Chief of the General Staff – General Sir Roland Walker
- Chief of the Air Staff – Air Chief Marshal Sir Harv Smyth
- Commander Cyber & Specialist Operations Command – General Sir Robert Magowan RM

=== Other senior military officers ===
The Chief of Defence Staff is supported by several Deputy Chiefs of the Defence Staff and senior officers at OF-8 rank.

- Chief of Defence People – Vice Admiral Phillip Hally
- Deputy Chief of Defence Staff (Military Strategy and Operations) – Lieutenant General Sir Charles Collins
- Deputy Chief of Defence Staff (Financial and Military Capability) – Lieutenant General Sir Robert Magowan RM
- Chief of Joint Operations – Lieutenant General Sir Charles Stickland, based at Northwood Headquarters
- Defence Senior Adviser Middle East – Air Marshal Martin Sampson
- Chief of Defence Intelligence – Adrian Bird
- Director-General of the Defence Safety Authority – Air Marshal Alan Gillespie

Additionally, there are a number of Assistant Chiefs of Defence Staff, including the Defence Services Secretary in the Royal Household of the Sovereign of the United Kingdom, who is also the Assistant Chief of Defence Staff (Personnel).

== Senior management ==
Permanent Secretary and other senior officials The Ministers and Chiefs of the Defence Staff are supported by several civilian, scientific and professional military advisors. The Permanent Under-Secretary of State for Defence (generally known as the Permanent Secretary) is the senior civil servant at the MOD. Their role is to ensure that it operates effectively as a government department and has responsibility for the strategy, performance, reform, organisation and the finances of the MOD. The role works closely with the Chief of the Defence Staff in leading the organisation and supporting Ministers in the conduct of business in the department across the full range of responsibilities.

- Permanent Under-Secretary of State for Defence – David Williams
- Second Permanent Secretary – Laurence Lee
- Chief Operating Officer – Nina Cope
- Director General Finance – Charlie Pate
- Director General Nuclear – Vanessa Nicholls
- Director General Security Policy – Dominic Wilson
- Director General Commercial – Andrew Forzani
- Director General Strategy and International – Angus Lapsley
- MOD Chief Scientific Adviser – Dame Angela McLean
- MOD Chief Scientific Adviser (Nuclear) – Professor Robin Grimes
- Lead Non-Executive Board Member – Lord Grimstone
- Non-Executive Defence Board Member and Chair of the Defence Audit Committee – Simon Henry
- Non-Executive Defence Board Member and Chair of the Defence Equipment and Support Board – Paul Skinner
- Non-Executive Defence Board Member and Chair of the People Committee – Danuta Gray

== Defence policy ==
The Strategic Defence and Security Review 2015 included £178 billion investment in new equipment and capabilities. The review set a defence policy with four primary missions for the Armed Forces:

- Defend and contribute to the security and resilience of the UK and Overseas Territories.
- Provide the nuclear deterrent.
- Contribute to improved understanding of the world through strategic intelligence and the global defence network.
- Reinforce international security and the collective capacity of our allies, partners and multilateral institutions.

The review stated the Armed Forces will also contribute to the government's response to crises by being prepared to:

- Support humanitarian assistance and disaster response, and conduct rescue missions.
- Conduct strike operations.
- Conduct operations to restore peace and stability.
- Conduct major combat operations if required, including under NATO Article 5.

== Governance and departmental organisation ==
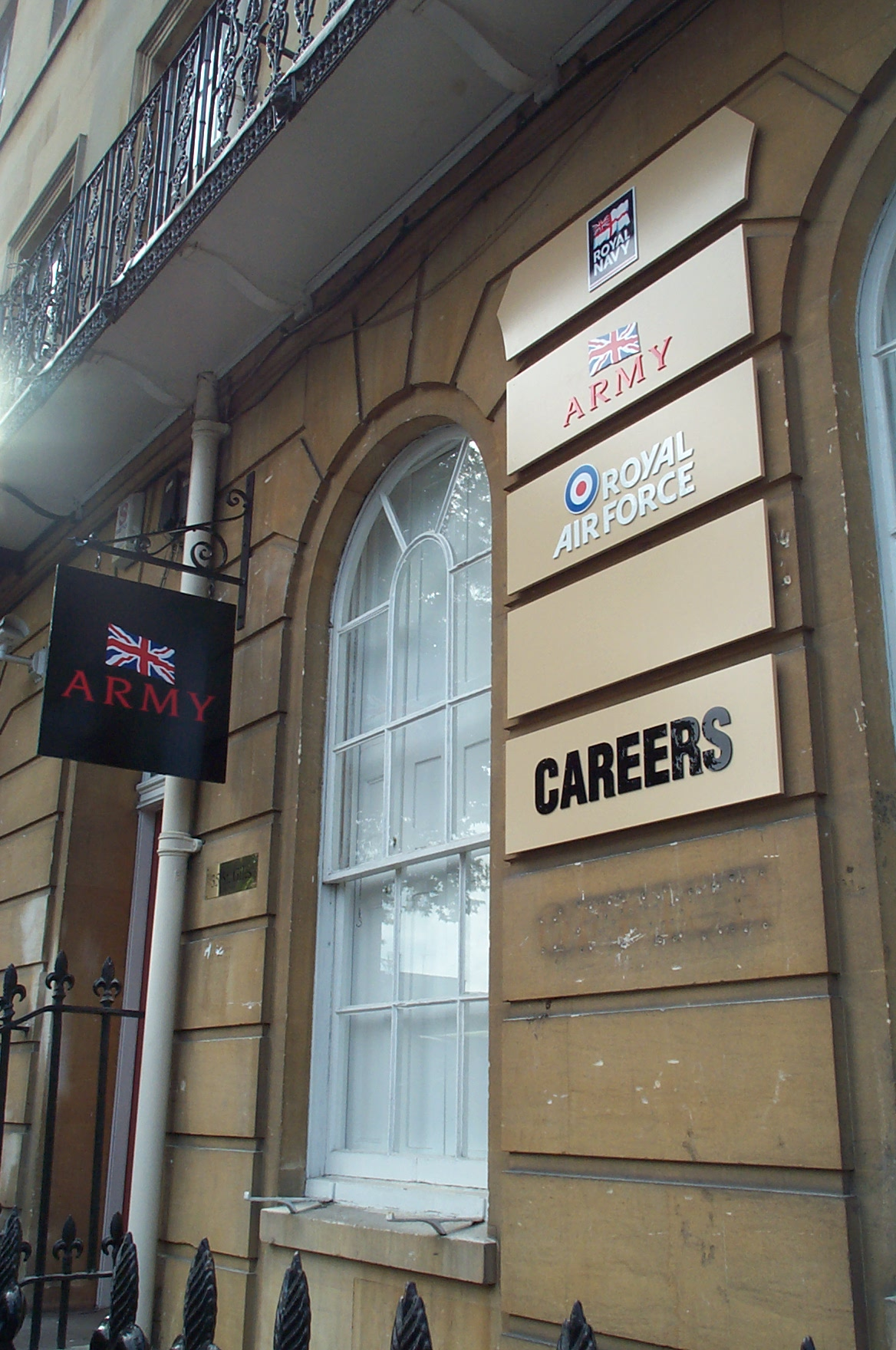
A British armed forces careers office in Oxford

=== Governance ===
Defence is governed and managed by several committees.

- The Defence Council provides the formal legal basis for the conduct of defence in the UK through a range of powers vested in it by statute and Letters Patent. It too is chaired by the Secretary of State, and its members are ministers, the senior officers and senior civilian officials.
- The Defence Board is the main MOD corporate board chaired by the Secretary of State oversees the strategic direction and oversight of defence, supported by an Investment Approvals Committee, Audit Committee and People Committee. The board's membership comprises the Secretary of State, the Armed Forces Minister, the Permanent Secretary, the Chief and Vice Chief of the Defence Staff, the Chief of Defence Materiel, Director General Finance and three non-executive board members.
- Head Office and Corporate Services (HOCS), which is made up of the Head Office and a range of corporate support functions. It has two joint heads the Chief of the Defence Staff and the Permanent Secretary who are the combined TLB holders for this unit they are responsible for directing the other TLB holders.

=== Departmental organisation ===
The following organisational groups come under the control of the MOD.

Top level budgets

The MOD comprises four top-level budgets. These are:

- Operations (Military Strategic Headquarters)
- Readiness (Military Strategic Headquarters)
- Investment (National Armaments Director)
- Defence Nuclear Organisation

Executive agencies

- Defence Equipment and Support (DE&S)
- Defence Science and Technology Laboratory (DSTL)
- Submarine Delivery Agency (SDA)
- UK Hydrographic Office (UKHO) – also has trading fund status.

Executive non-departmental public bodies

- AWE Nuclear Security Technologies
- Armed Forces Covenant Trust Fund
- National Museum of the Royal Navy
- National Army Museum
- Royal Air Force Museum
- Single Source Regulations Office (SSRO)

Advisory non-departmental public bodies

- Advisory Committee on Conscientious Objectors
- Advisory Group on Military Medicine
- Armed Forces Pay Review Body
- Defence Nuclear Safety Committee
- Independent Medical Expert Group
- National Employer Advisory Board
- Nuclear Research Advisory Council
- Scientific Advisory Committee on the Medical Implications of Less-Lethal Weapons
- Veterans Advisory and Pensions Committees

Other bodies

- Central Advisory Committee on Compensation
- Commonwealth War Graves Commission
- Defence Academy of the United Kingdom
- Defence and Security Media Advisory Committee
- Defence Business Services (DBS)
- Defence Infrastructure Organisation (DIO)
- Fleet Air Arm Museum
- Independent monitoring board for the Military Corrective Training Centre (Colchester)
- Reserve Forces' and Cadets' Associations
- Royal Hospital Chelsea
- Royal Marines Museum
- Royal Navy Submarine Museum
- Service Complaints Ombudsman
- Service Prosecuting Authority
- United Kingdom Reserve Forces Association
- Defence Police
  - Ministry of Defence Police
  - Sovereign Base Area Police
  - Gibraltar Defence Police

Public corporations

- Oil and Pipelines Agency (OPA)
- Sheffield Forgemasters
- AWE Plc

In addition, the MOD is responsible for the administration of the Sovereign Base Areas of Akrotiri and Dhekelia in Cyprus.

=== Contracting ===
Competitive procurement processes are used whenever possible, and all new direct tender and contract opportunities valued over £10,000 are advertised on a system called the Defence Sourcing Portal. A separate internal policy generally operates in respect of low value purchasing below this threshold.

DEFCON contract conditions are numbered defence contract conditions are in contracts issued by the MOD (not to be confused with DEFCON as used by the United States Armed Forces, which refers to a level of military "defence readiness condition").

Examples include:

- DEFCON 534: Subcontracting and prompt payment
- DEFCON 620: a change control procedure
- DEFCON 658 (cyber) applies to all suppliers down the supply chain
- DEFCON 659 relates to security measures for disclosure of "Secret Matters" including within the supply chain, requiring a contractor to ensure that employees "engaged on any work in connection with the Contract have notice that the Official Secrets Acts 1911–1989 apply to them and will continue so to apply after the completion or termination of the Contract", potentially also requiring employees to "sign a statement acknowledging that, both during the term of the Contract and after its completion or termination", they are bound by the Official Secrets Acts 1911–1989 (and where applicable by any other legislation).
- DEFCON 705: the MOD's standard IPR condition for fully funded research and technology contracts.

A full set of the DEFCONs can be accessed via the MoD's Defence Gateway (registration required).

The government noted in 2013 that the MoD's third-party expenditure was characterised by "complex, high-value contracts". Defence purchasing contributes to government ambitions to make supply chains more accessible to small and medium-sized enterprises, but the government commented that it had yet to secure good insight into the supply chain role of SMEs.

=== Consultation ===
The National Defence Industries Council is a UK body through which the Ministry is able to consult strategically with its principal defence suppliers and, through the Council's sub-groups, to consult with bodies in specific industrial sectors. Membership consists of a range of companies and appointments are made "at the discretion of the Secretary of State".

== Property portfolio ==
The Ministry of Defence is one of the United Kingdom's largest landowners, owning 227,300 hectares of land and foreshore (either freehold or leasehold) at April 2014, which was valued at "about £20 billion". The MOD also has "rights of access" to a further 222,000 hectares. In total, this is about 1.8% of the UK land mass. The total annual cost to support the defence estate is "in excess of £3.3 billion".

The defence estate consists of training areas and ranges (84.0%), research and development facilities (5.4%), airfields (3.4%), barracks and camps (2.5%), storage and supply depots (1.6%), and other (3.0%). These are largely managed by the Defence Infrastructure Organisation.

=== Main Building ===
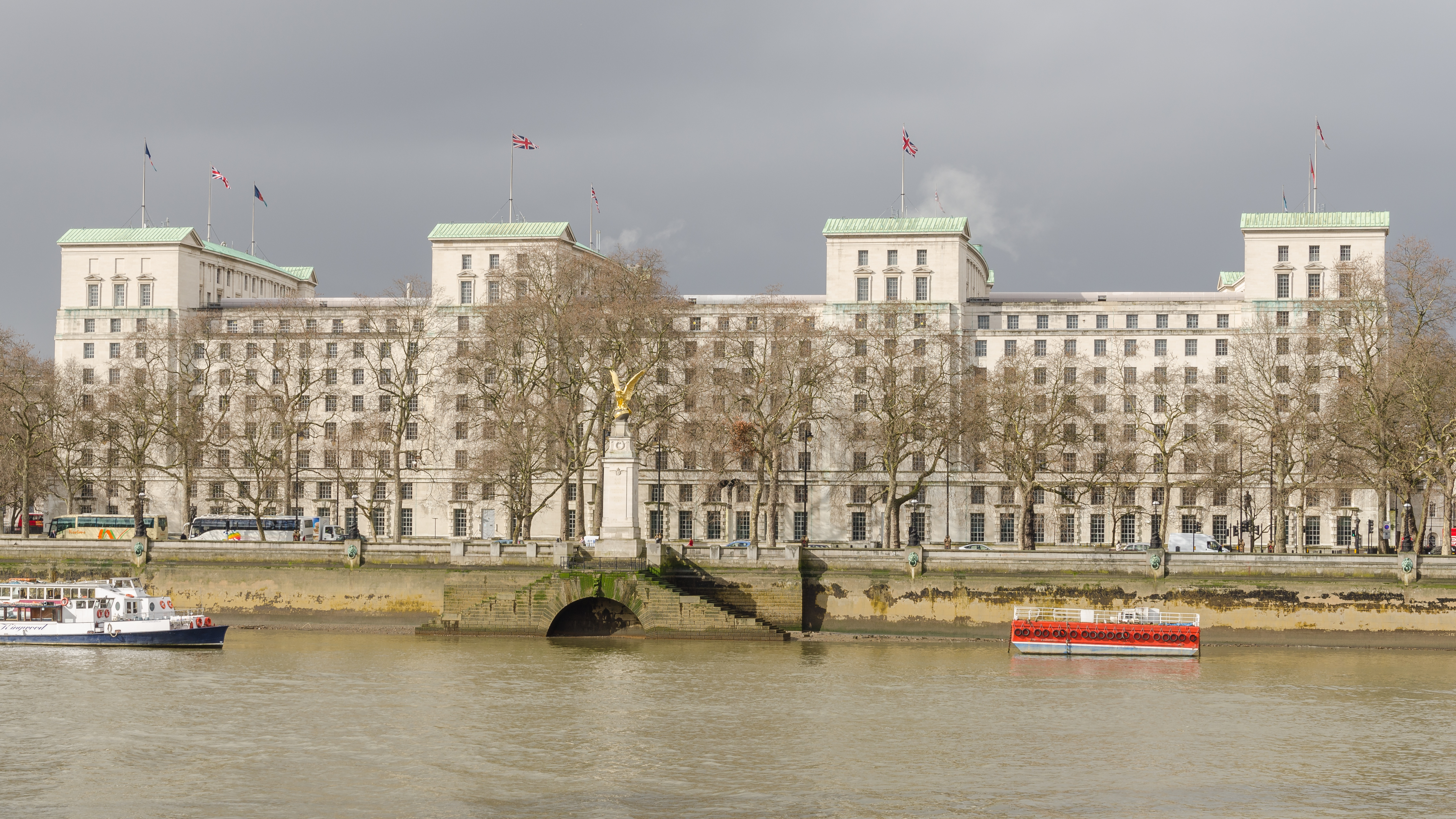
The MOD Main Building, Whitehall, London

The headquarters of the MOD are in Whitehall and is known as MOD Main Building. This structure is neoclassical in style and was originally built between 1938 and 1959 to designs by Vincent Harris to house the Air Ministry and the Board of Trade. A major refurbishment of the building was completed under a Private Finance Initiative contract by Skanska in 2004. The northern entrance in Horse Guards Avenue is flanked by two monumental statues, Earth and Water, by Charles Wheeler. Opposite stands the Gurkha Monument, sculpted by Philip Jackson and unveiled in 1997 by Queen Elizabeth II. Within it is the Victoria Cross and George Cross Memorial, and nearby are memorials to the Fleet Air Arm and RAF (to its east, facing the riverside).

Henry VIII's wine cellar at the Palace of Whitehall, built in 1514–1516 for Cardinal Wolsey, is in the basement of Main Building, and is used for entertainment. The entire vaulted brick structure of the cellar was encased in steel and concrete and relocated nine feet to the west and nearly 19 feet (5.8 m) deeper in 1949, when construction was resumed at the site after World War II. This was carried out without any significant damage to the structure.

== See also ==
- Defence Review – Process by which government of the United Kingdom decides upon its overall defence policy
- Lancaster House Treaties – 2010 treaties between United Kingdom and France
- Stabilisation Unit – Government unit in the United Kingdom
- Budget of the United Kingdom – Balance sheet of the British government
- UK National Defence Association – Pressure group supporting an increase in the UK's defence budget

== Bibliography ==
- Chester, D. N and Willson, F. M. G. The Organisation of British Central Government 1914–1964: Chapters VI and X (2nd edition). London: George Allen & Unwin, 1968.
