= Royal Air Force Memorial =

Memorial in London, England

Coordinates: 51°30′14.35″N 0°7′23.25″W

- Great Britain
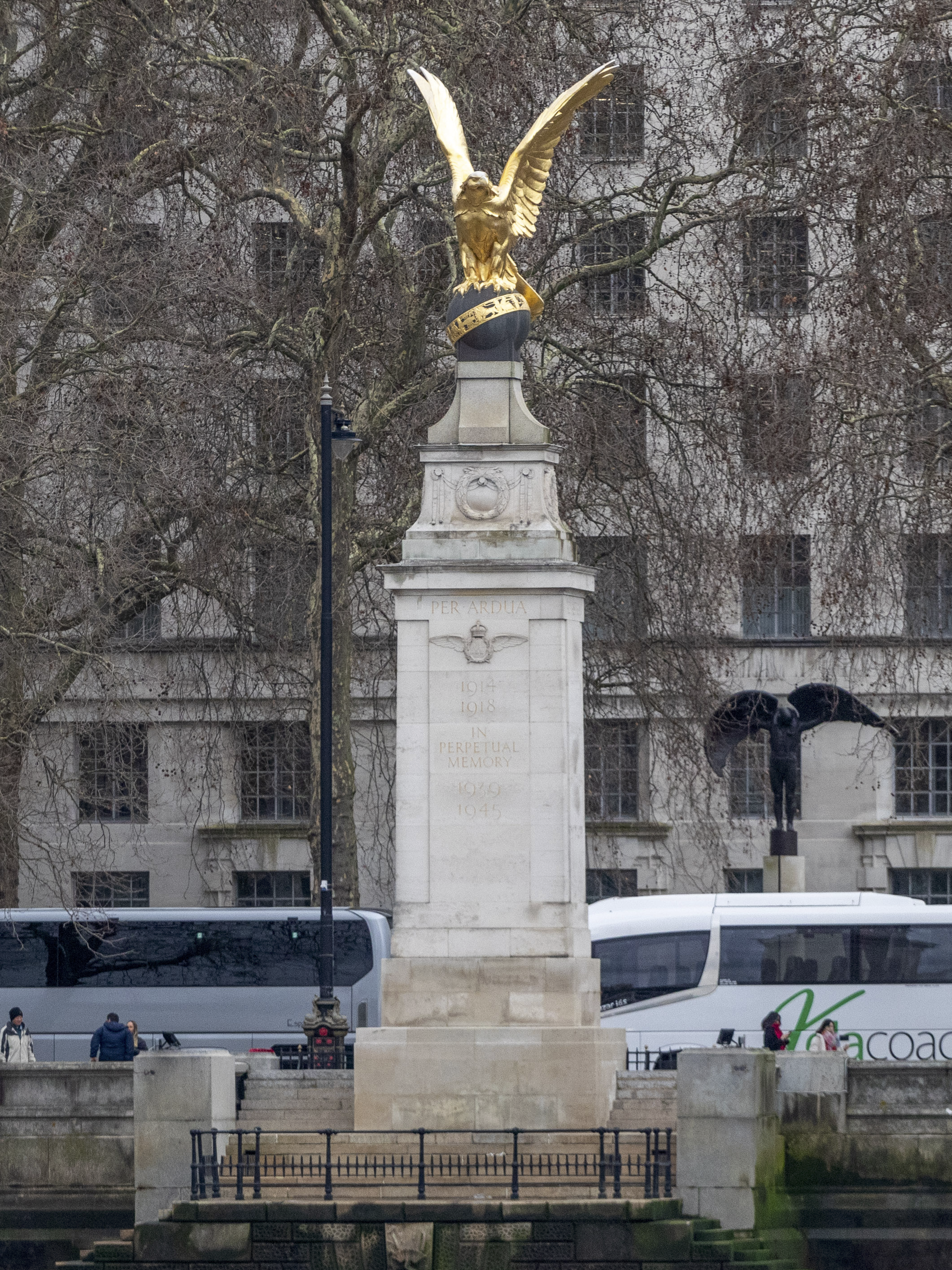
- Royal Air Force Memorial in 2026
- For RAF personnel killed in the two world wars
- Unveiled: 1923; 103 years ago
- Location: London, WC2; United Kingdom
- Designed by: Sir Reginald Blomfield (monument), William Reid Dick (eagle)
- Inscriptions include: "Per ardua ad astra" and "I bare you on eagles wings and brought you unto myself" (Exodus 19:4)

Listed Building – Grade II*
- Official name: The Royal Air Force Memorial
- Designated: 24 February 1958
- Reference no.: 1066171

The Royal Air Force Memorial is a military memorial on the Victoria Embankment in central London, dedicated to the memory of the casualties of the Royal Air Force in World War I and, by extension, all subsequent conflicts. Unveiled in 1923, it became a Grade II listed structure in 1958, and was upgraded to Grade II* in 2018. It is considered to be the official memorial of the RAF and related services.

It is sited at Whitehall Steps, near Cleopatra's Needle, between the north-bank ends of Charing Cross Bridge and Westminster Bridge, and directly to the east of the main Ministry of Defence building on Whitehall. The Fleet Air Arm Memorial and the Battle of Britain Monument are nearby.

== Background ==
A committee to erect an RAF memorial was first established in February 1919, and relaunched in January 1920, led by Lord Hugh Cecil and Air Chief Marshal Sir Hugh Trenchard. Funds to erect a memorial were raised by the RAF Memorial Fund subsequently known as the RAF Benevolent Fund. The memorial was designed by Sir Reginald Blomfield.

The memorial was unveiled on 16 July 1923 by the Prince of Wales (later Edward VIII). The Chief of the Air Staff traditionally places a wreath at the memorial on Battle of Britain Day, 15 September, each year.

== Description ==
The memorial comprises a tapering Portland stone pylon topped by zodiacal globe bearing a gilded eagle, taken from the RAF's badge, with raised wings, facing east towards the River Thames and nominally towards France. The eagle was sculpted by William Reid Dick and cast by the Parlanti Foundry. Blomfield used similar pylons for Torquay War Memorial and Luton War Memorial, topped by different devices.

The pylon bears inscriptions on the sides facing the Embankment to the west and to the river to the east. Further inscriptions were added after the Second World War, unveiled by Trenchard on 15 September 1946.

== Inscriptions ==
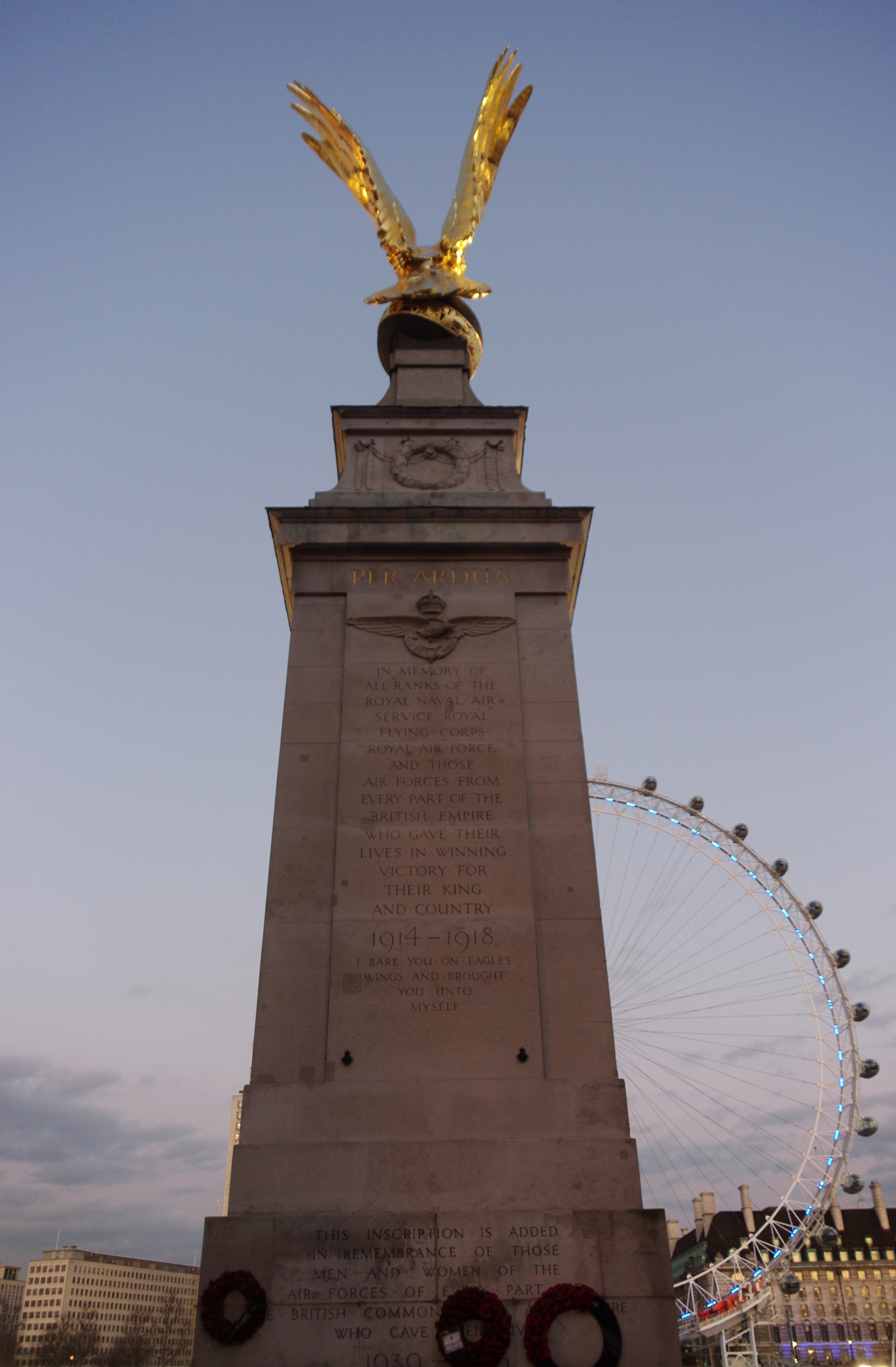
West face with inscriptions

Around the top of the pylon, each face bears alternately the words PER ARDUA and AD ASTRA, from the motto of the RAF, "Per ardua ad astra", which was initially the Royal Flying Corps motto when created in 1912. On the west side of the pylon facing the Embankment, the words "Per Ardua" are picked out in gold, and lower down there is the RAF insignia, and a dedication: IN MEMORY OF/ ALL RANKS OF THE/ ROYAL NAVAL AIR/ SERVICE ROYAL/ FLYING CORPS/ ROYAL AIR FORCE/ AND THOSE/ AIR FORCES FROM/ EVERY PART OF THE/ BRITISH EMPIRE/ WHO GAVE THEIR/ LIVES IN WINNING/ VICTORY FOR/ THEIR KING/ AND COUNTRY/ 1914–1918", and a quotation from Exodus, chapter 19: I BARE YOU ON EAGLES/ WINGS AND BROUGHT/ YOU UNTO/ MYSELF. Further down, on the base, is another inscription THIS INSCRIPTION IS ADDED/ IN REMEMBRANCE OF THOSE/ MEN AND WOMEN OF THE/ AIR FORCES OF EVERY PART OF/ THE BRITISH COMMONWEALTH AND EMPIRE/ WHO GAVE THEIR LIVES/ 1939–1945. The side facing the river bears the RAF insignia again and the inscription: 1914/ 1918/ IN/ PERPETUAL/ MEMORY/ 1939–1945. Thus, the monument was not initially created purely for the RAF, but for all 'Air Services' that served during World War One.

== See also ==
- Grade II* listed war memorials in England

=== Other Royal Air Force Memorials ===
- Royal Air Force Memorial, Albany, Georgia
- South African Air Force Memorial, Swartkop, Tshwane

=== Other RAF memorials ===
- Air Forces Memorial
- RAF Bomber Command Memorial
