= Fleet Air Arm Memorial =

War memorial in London

Coordinates: 51.5040°N 0.1240°W

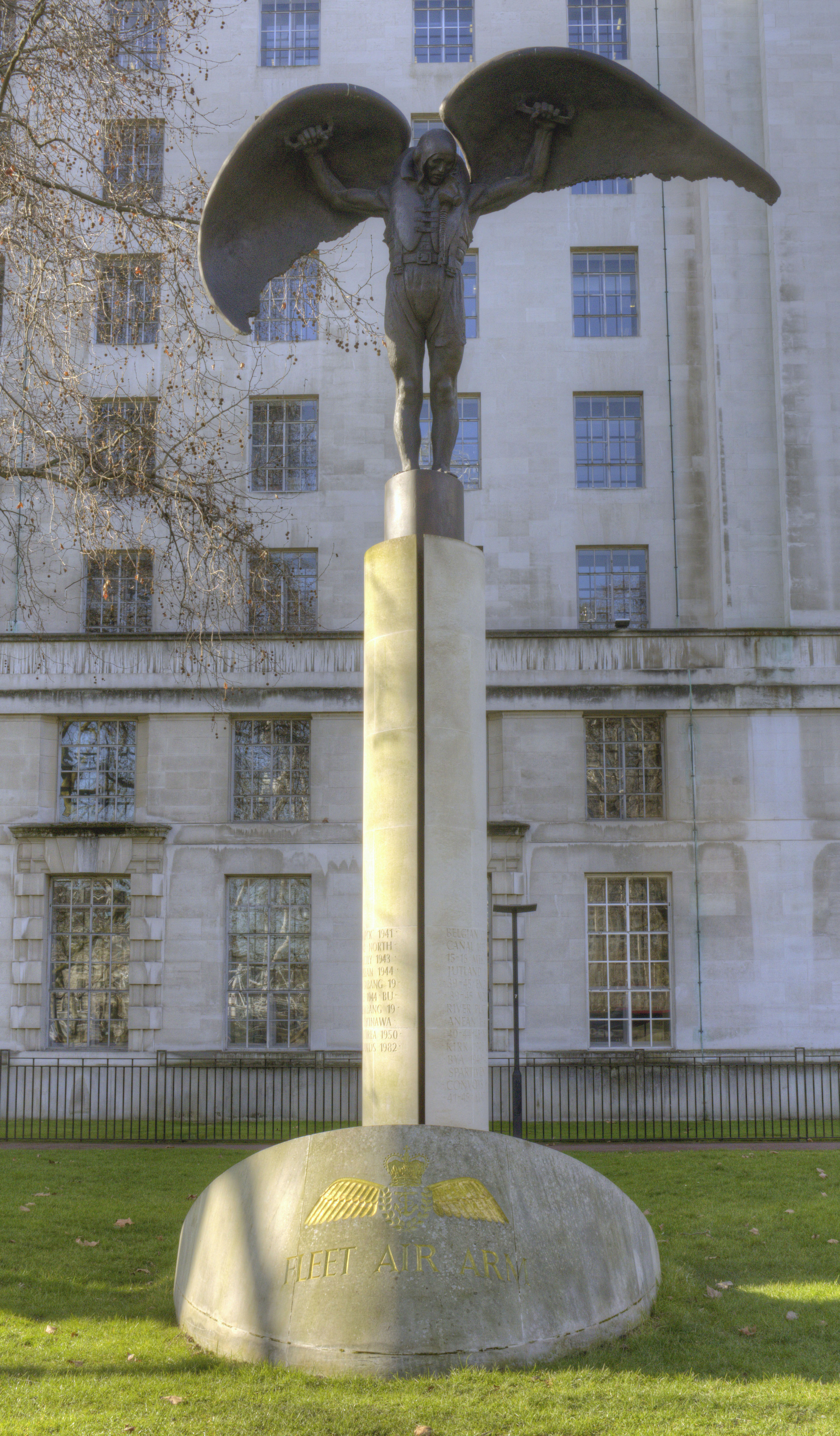

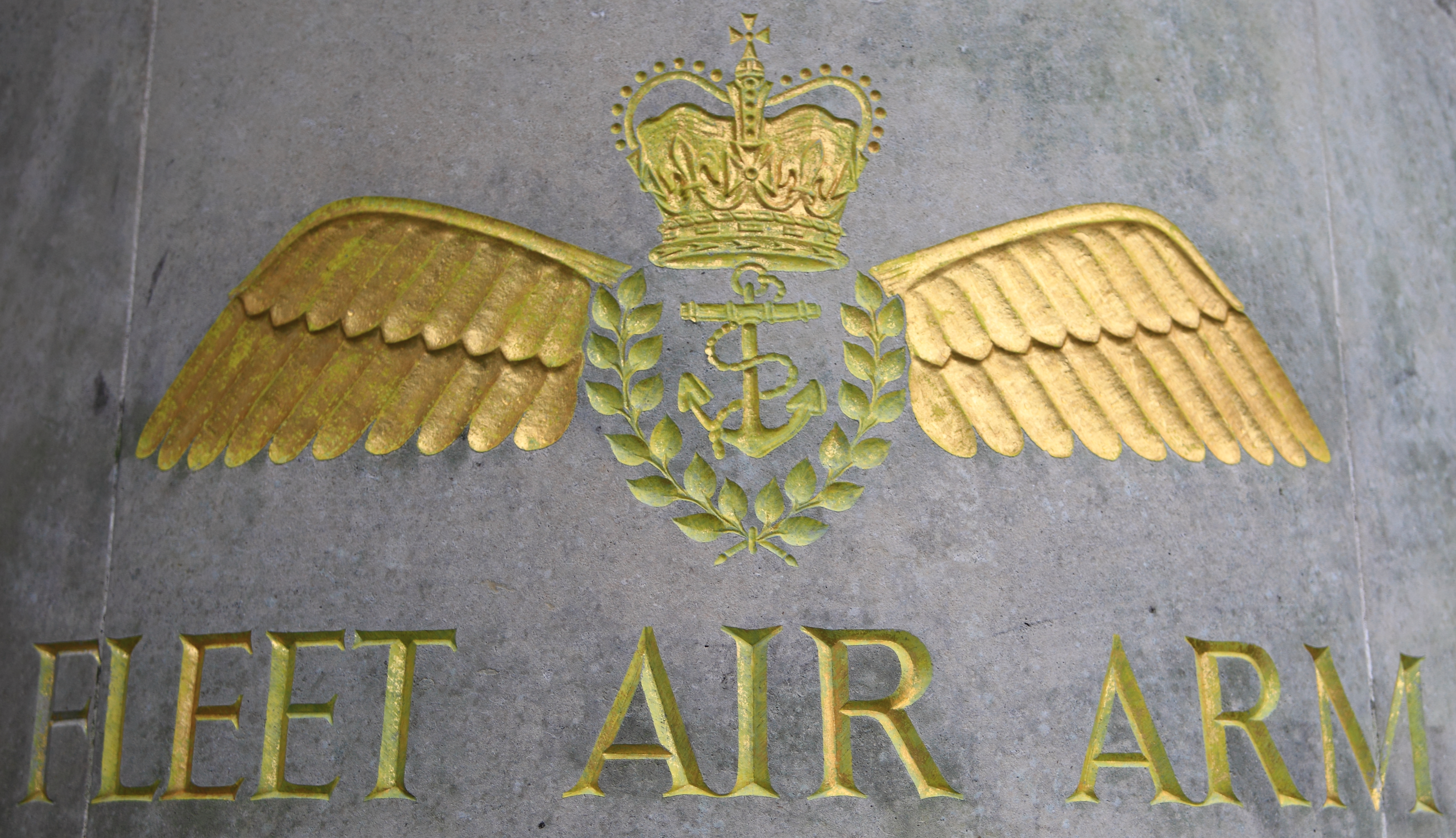

The Fleet Air Arm Memorial, sometimes known as Daedalus, is a war memorial in London, commemorating the service of the Royal Naval Air Service and the Fleet Air Arm from their establishments in 1914 and 1924 respectively, in the First World War, the Second World War, the Korean War, the Falklands War and the Gulf War, including over 6,000 killed in all conflicts. The service of the Fleet Air Arm is also commemorated at the National Memorial Arboretum in Staffordshire, at the former base of the Fleet Air Arm at HMS Daedalus in Lee-on-the-Solent, and at the Church of St Bartholomew, Yeovilton.

The memorial comprises a thin stone column on which stands a bronze statue of a naval airman, wearing a flying suit and helmet, and with wings attached to his arms like Daedalus from Ancient Greek mythology, resembling a winged victory or an angel. The base of the memorial has a gilded inscription of the name and insignia of the Fleet Air Arm. It also bears the names of battles where the units fought, a dedication "To the everlasting memory of all the men and women from the United Kingdom the British Commonwealth and the many Allied Nations who have given their lives whilst serving in the Royal Naval Air Service and the Fleet Air Arm", and a quotation from Psalm 18:10: "He rode upon a cherub and did fly yea he did fly upon the wings of the wind".

It was designed by Tim Kempster of Trehearne Architects with the sculpture of Daedalus by James Butler. It was unveiled on 1 June 2000 by Charles, Prince of Wales, and stands in Victoria Embankment Gardens, between the River Thames and the headquarters of the Ministry of Defence, facing the Royal Air Force Memorial. Also nearby are the Korean War Memorial, the Iraq and Afghanistan Memorial, the Chindit Memorial, and the Battle of Britain Monument.
