= Margaret, Duchess of Norfolk =

English noblewoman (1322–1399)

Margaret of Norfolk

Countess of Norfolk
- Reign: 1338–1399
- Predecessor: Thomas of Brotherton, 1st Earl of Norfolk
- Successor: Thomas de Mowbray, 1st Duke of Norfolk
- Born: c. 1322; Framlingham Castle, Suffolk, England
- Died: 24 March 1399
- Burial: Grey Friars, London
- Spouse: John Segrave, 4th Baron Segrave; Sir Walter Mauny
- Issue: John de Segrave; John de Segrave; Elizabeth de Segrave; Margaret de Segrave; Thomas Mauny; Anne Hastings, Countess of Pembroke; Isabel Mauny
- House: Plantagenet
- Father: Thomas of Brotherton
- Mother: Alice de Hales

Margaret of Norfolk or Margaret of Brotherton, Duchess of Norfolk in her own right (sometimes surnamed as "Margaret Marshal"; c. 1322–24 March 1399), was an English peer, the daughter and eventual sole heir of Thomas of Brotherton, eldest son of King Edward I of England by his second marriage. In 1338, she succeeded to the earldom of Norfolk and the office of Earl Marshal. In 1397, she was created Duchess of Norfolk for life.

== Family ==
Born around 1322, Margaret was the daughter of Thomas of Brotherton and Alice de Hales, who died in or sometime before 1330. Her paternal grandparents were King Edward I and Margaret of France, daughter of King Philip III of France. Her maternal grandparents were Sir Roger de Hales of Hales Hall in Loddon, Norfolk, and his wife Alice Skogan. She had two siblings:

- Edward of Norfolk, who married Beatrice Mortimer, daughter of Roger Mortimer, 1st Earl of March, but died without issue before 9 August 1334.
- Alice of Norfolk, who married Sir Edward Montagu.

== Life ==
In 1335, Margaret was married to John Segrave, 4th Baron Segrave, and had four children - two sons and two daughters - by him. In 1350, she sought an annulment on the grounds that they had been contracted in marriage (in other words, betrothed) before she was of marriageable age, and that she had never consented to cohabit with him. She made known her intention of travelling to the continent in order to plead personally with the Pope for an annulment. King Edward III prohibited her from leaving England, but she set off incognito anyway, having taken care to obtain safe conduct from King Philip VI of France.

Edward III's motivations were also to keep Margaret's children legitimate. If Margaret's marriage to her husband was annulled, then her children with John de Segrave, 4th Baron Segrave, would be considered illegitimate, damaging Edward III's plans for their marriages into the royal House of Plantagenet. John de Segrave, the son and heir of Margaret and the 4th Baron Segrave, was contracted to marry Blanche of Lancaster, the younger daughter and coheiress of Henry of Grosmont, 1st Duke of Lancaster, a second cousin of the King, and one of the King's most trusted captains. However, the marriage contract was later declared void.

Around 1349, a double marriage was solemnized in which John de Segrave married Blanche de Mowbray, the daughter of John de Mowbray, 3rd Baron Mowbray by his first wife, Aline de Brewes, daughter of William de Braose, 2nd Baron Braose; while John de Segrave's sister, Elizabeth de Segrave, married Blanche de Mowbray's brother, John de Mowbray, 4th Baron Mowbray. Pope Clement VI granted papal dispensations for the marriages at the request of Henry of Grosmont, in order to prevent 'disputes between the parents'. John de Segrave died around 1353, making Elizabeth de Segrave the 5th Baroness Segrave suo jure.

Two years after the double marriage, and a year following Margaret's request for an annulment (1351), Edward III charged Margaret with having crossed the English Channel, in contravention of his prohibition. The inquisition, regarding this incident, shows that Margaret unlawfully crossed the Channel and met with a servant of her future husband, Sir Walter Manny, 1st Baron Manny, who broke his lantern with his foot so she could pass unnoticed, and acted as her guardian during her sojourn in France. This incident and the involvement of her future husband's retainer may indicate the real motivation for Margaret seeking an annulment.

The annulment case was ultimately heard by the Pope's auditor, the Dean of St. Hilary's at Poitiers. However, Margaret's first husband died in 1353, before the annulment could be finalized. Shortly thereafter, and just before 30 May 1354, she married Walter Manny, 1st Baron Manny without the King's license. They were married for 18 years, and had three children before he died in London on 8 or 13 January 1372.

On 29 September 1397, Margaret was created Duchess of Norfolk for life, simultaneously with the Duchy of Norfolk's first creation in the person of Thomas de Mowbray, her most senior male grandchild, son of Elizabeth de Segrave, who would not have otherwise inherited her titles as he was a descendant through the female-line. Margaret died 24 March 1399, and was buried in the choir of Grey Friars in the City of London.

The executors of her will are reported to be John Sileby and Walter fitz Piers, who in 1399 were reported to be attempting to recover money due to her estate.

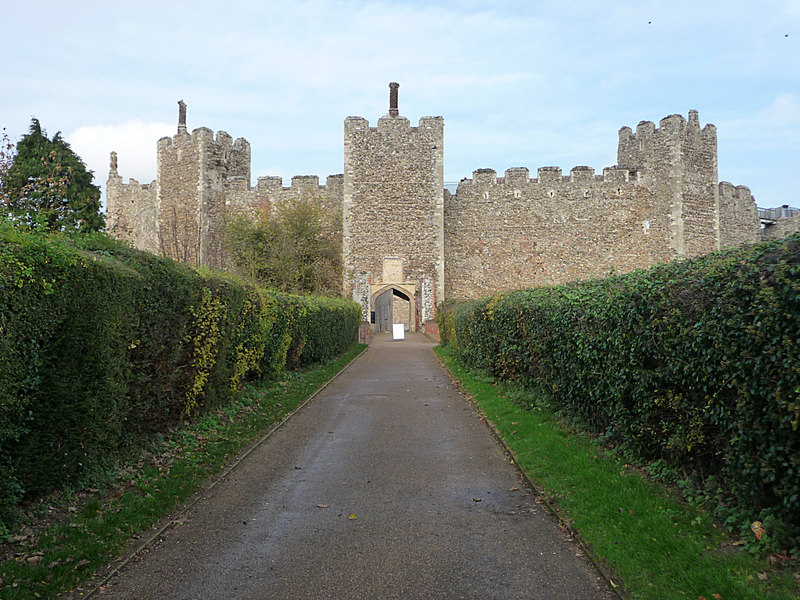
Framlingham Castle

== Residence ==
She was most likely born at Framlingham Castle in Suffolk, England while her father Thomas de Brotherton was the 1st Earl of Norfolk. The castle had been given to her father by her uncle, King Edward II before her birth and so it was her childhood home. She inherited the castle herself on her father's death

== Marriages and issue ==
Margaret married firstly, about 1335, John Segrave, 4th Baron Segrave, by whom she had two sons and two daughters:

- John de Segrave, who died young.
- John de Segrave, second of that name, who was contracted to marry Blanche of Lancaster, younger daughter and coheiress of Henry of Grosmont, 1st Duke of Lancaster. However, the contract was later declared void and Blanche later married John of Gaunt, son of King Edward III. About 1349, a double marriage was solemnized in which John Segrave married Blanche Mowbray, while John's sister, Elizabeth Segrave, married Blanche Mowbray's brother, John. Pope Clement VI granted dispensations for the marriages at the request of Lancaster, in order to prevent 'disputes between the parents', who were neighbours. He died on 1 April 1353.
- Elizabeth de Segrave, 5th Baroness Segrave (d. 1368), who married John de Mowbray, 4th Baron Mowbray.
- Margaret de Segrave, who died young, before 1353.

Shortly before 30 May 1354, Margaret married secondly, and without the King's license, Sir Walter de Manny, 1st Baron Manny, by whom she had a son and two daughters:

- Thomas Manny, who drowned in a well at Deptford at the age of five.
- Anne Manny, 2nd Baroness Manny, who married John Hastings, 2nd Earl of Pembroke. They had one son, John Hastings, 3rd Earl of Pembroke, who married firstly Elizabeth of Lancaster, the daughter of John of Gaunt, in 1380, with the marriage being annulled six years later. Secondly, he married Philippa Mortimer, daughter of Edmund Mortimer, 3rd Earl of March. He died at the age of 17 in a jousting accident without any issue. Upon his death, the Earldom of Pembroke and the Barony of Manny became extinct, while the Barony of Hastings passed to his cousin, John Hastings, 6th Baron Hastings.
- Isabel Manny, who was living in 1358, but died without issue before 30 November 1371.

Margaret was predeceased by many of her children and grandchildren, of whom many also died without issue; by 1390, Margaret's only living descendants were her grandchildren (and great-grandchildren) by her eldest daughter Elizabeth de Segrave. In order of seniority, they were: Margaret de Mowbray and her issue; Joan de Mowbray and her issue; Eleanor de Mowbray and her issue; and Thomas de Mowbray, 1st Duke of Norfolk, and his issue. It would be to Thomas and his line that Margaret's titles would ultimately fall after her death in 1397.

== Distinction ==
As her brother had died without issue, she succeeded to the earldom of Norfolk and the office of Earl Marshal at her father's death in 1338. To date, she is the only woman to have held the latter office.

== Fictional representations ==
Margaret is a character in Georgette Heyer's last novel My Lord John, where she is portrayed sympathetically as a kindly though outwardly formidable old lady. She is saddened by the death of so many of her children and grandchildren, in particular, the death by drowning of her infant son Thomas Mauny. In her last years, she is shown as being gravely concerned for the future of England, due to the misrule of her cousin King Richard II.

== Notes ==
Political offices
Preceded by Earl of Norfolk	Countess Marshal; 1338–1377	Succeeded by Earl of Northumberland
Peerage of England
Preceded by Thomas of Brotherton	Countess of Norfolk; 1338–1399	Succeeded by Thomas Mowbray
