= Kyre Park =

Country house and gardens in Worcestershire, England

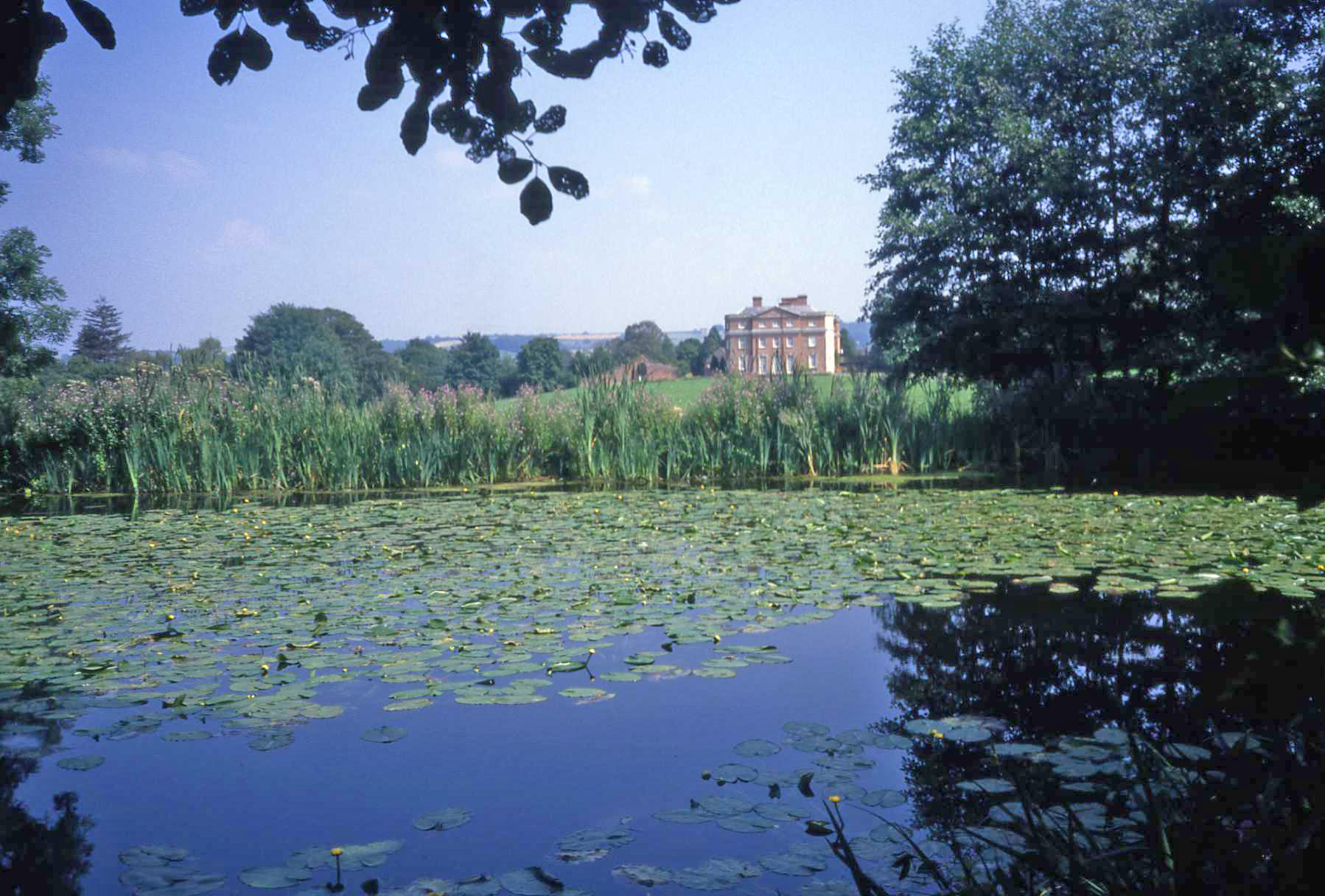

- Location within Worcestershire
- 52°16′7″N 2°32′57″W
- Location: Kyre, Worcestershire
- OS grid reference: SO 626 635

Site notes
- Website: www.kyrepark.com

National Register of Historic Parks and Gardens
- Designated: 28 February 1986
- Reference no.: 1000889

Listed Building – Grade II
- Designated: 18 April 1966
- Reference no.: 1179391

Kyre Park is a privately owned country house, parkland and gardens, about 3 miles (4.8 km) south-east of Tenbury Wells in Worcestershire, England. The parkland and gardens are listed Grade II in Historic England's Register of Parks and Gardens, and the house is a Grade II listed building. The house is closed to the public; the park and gardens are open daily.

== History ==
A royal licence to create a deer park at Kyre was granted in 1275. It is thought that its area was 500 acres (200 ha), this being reduced to 180 acres (73 ha) in the late 18th century.

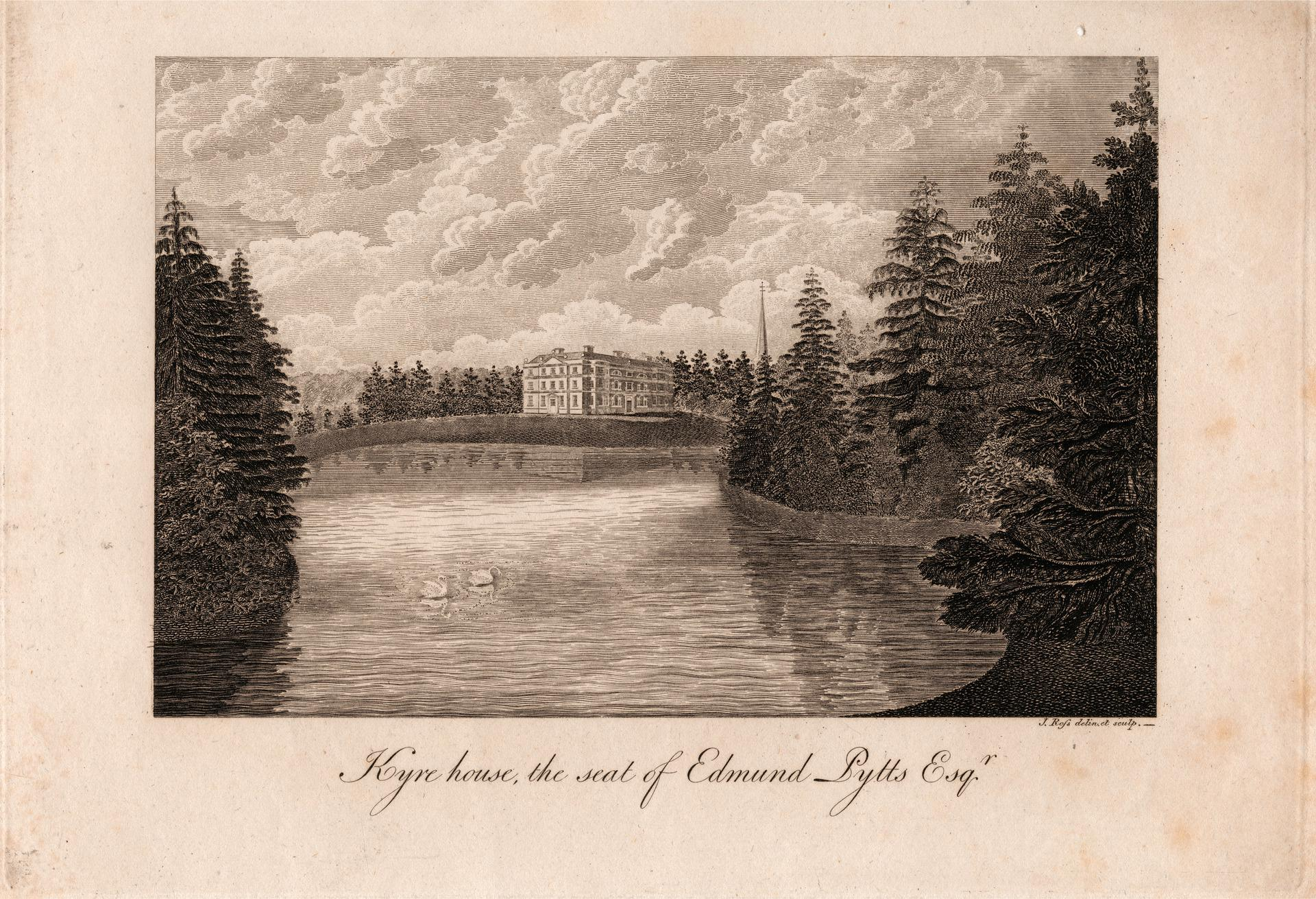
Engraving by James Ross (1745–1821)

The manor was sold by Lord Compton in 1575, when the house was in a ruinous condition, to Sir Edward Pytts. He repaired and extended the house, and his son Sir James Pytts continued the work. It remained in the family, passing to Edmund Pytts, then on his death in 1781 to his brother Jonathan. On the death of Jonathan's widow in 1832 it passed to his second cousin William Lacon Childe of Kinlet. His son, Rev. Edward Baldwyn-Childe, became the owner in 1880, and it passed to his widow Frances Christina Baldwyn-Childe on his death in 1898.

In the 1930s it passed to Birmingham Council, and in 1965 to the Spastics Society. It became privately owned again in 1993.

== The house and adjacent buildings ==
The oldest part of the building, in the west, was a fortified house of the 14th century. The house was remodelled for Edmund Pytts from 1753 to 1756 by W. and D. Hiorne, with a new south front added. From 1880 to 1893 there was further restoration and extension, with the building being extended to the east. In the 1930s the hall, built about 1600, was demolished and a new north front was built.

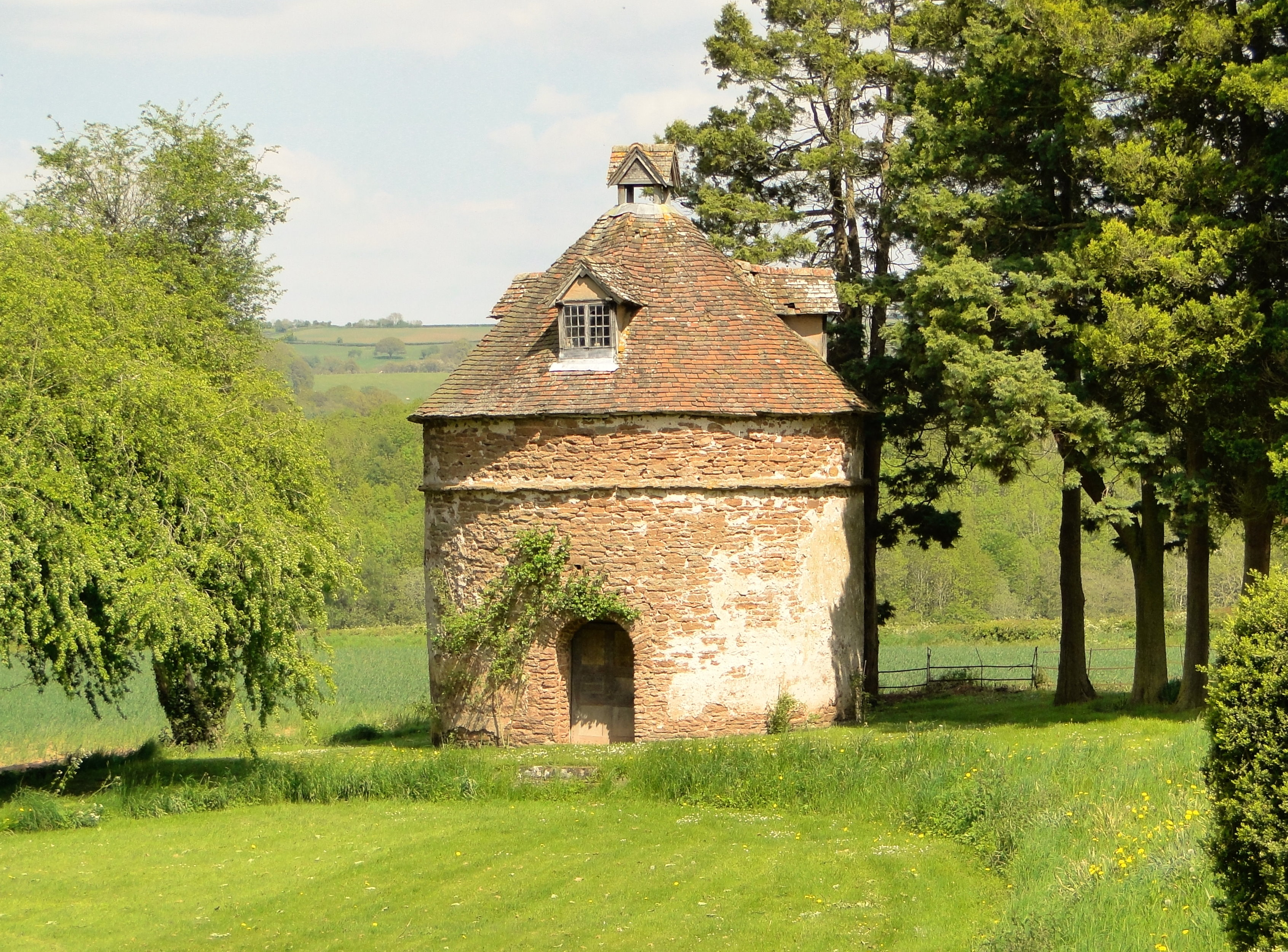
The dovecote

St Mary's Church is immediately to the south of the house. It dates from the 12th century, with additions of the 14th and 18th century, and was restored about 1833. It is a Grade II* listed building. To the north-east of the house is a dovecote, built about 1600 or earlier, Grade II* listed. It was originally on the south side of the house, and was moved here for Edmund Pytts in 1752. It is circular, with a conical tiled roof. To the east of the house is a barn built about 1618 for Sir Edward Pytts, which is Grade II listed. It is 130 feet (40 m) long, built of brick with a tiled roof. It is now occupied by Olive & Barr Kitchens.

== Grounds ==
The grounds were laid out in the second half of the 18th century. There is a semicircular string of five pools looping west from the house; these envelop a lawn of width about 200 metres (660 ft), which slopes gently away from the house. Between the pools there are ornamental cascades and bridges.
