= Listed buildings in Burford, Shropshire =

Burford is a civil parish in Shropshire, England. It contains 13 listed buildings that are recorded in the National Heritage List for England. Of these, one is listed at Grade I, the highest of the three grades, two are at Grade II*, the middle grade, and the others are at Grade II, the lowest grade. The parish contains the village of Burford and the surrounding countryside. Some of the listed buildings are grouped around Burford House and its neighbouring St Mary's Church to the southwest of the village. Otherwise, in and around the village, the listed buildings include a bridge over the River Teme, a hotel, a hospital, a cottage, a former toll house, and two mileposts.

== Key ==
Grade	Criteria
I	Buildings of exceptional interest, sometimes considered to be internationally important
II*	Particularly important buildings of more than special interest
II	Buildings of national importance and special interest

== Buildings ==
Name and location	Photograph	Date	Notes	Grade
St Mary's Church; 52.30877°N 2.61264°W		12th century	The earliest part of the church is the chancel, the nave and tower dating from the 14th century, and the church was extensively restored in 1889–90 by Aston Webb. It is in stone with tile roofs, coped gables, and embattled parapets with corner pinnacles. The church consists of a nave with a south porch, a chancel with a north vestry, and a west tower. The tower has angle buttresses surmounted by crocketed gablets, a west door and window, and a cusped arcaded embattled parapet. The chancel contains Norman features, the nave is in Decorated style and the tower is Perpendicular.	I
Churchyard cross 52.30869°N 2.61239°W		Medieval	The cross is in the churchyard of St Mary's Church, and is set on four octagonal steps and a square plinth with chamfered corners. On this is about 0.45 metres (1 ft 6 in) of the original cross shaft, and above it is a restoration of 1867, consisting of carvings of the Crucifixion and the Nativity.	II
Teme Bridge; 52.31394°N 2.59474°W		14th century	The bridge carries the A4112 road over the River Teme. It was partly rebuilt in the 18th century, widened by Thomas Telford in 1815, and widened again in 1868 and in 1908. It is in stone, with reinforcement in concrete, and has iron balustrading. The bridge has six spans, with segmental arches and cutwaters, and is angled in the centre.	II
Burford House and garden wall 52.30827°N 2.61427°W		1728	A country house in red brick with bands and a tile roof with coped gables and parapets. There are three storeys and a symmetrical front of six bays, a double-depth plan, and a rear parallel extension. In the centre is a projecting porch with Greek Doric columns and an open pediment, and above the doorway is a fanlight. The windows are sashes with gauged brick lintels. Brick garden walls extend from the southeast corner of the house.	II*
Garden House, Burford House; 52.30901°N 2.61547°W	—	1728	An open fronted portico in brick, with four Roman Doric columns, and a pediment that contains a coat of arms in wrought iron. There are flanking parapets with ball finials, and the rear wall is semicircular.	II*
Stable block, Burford House; 52.30861°N 2.61398°W	—	Mid 18th century	The stable block is in brick with tile roofs, and consists of a two-storey square central block with a pyramidal roof, flanked by single-storey gabled wings. On the top is a tower with a clock face, an octagonal round-arched arcade, an ogival lead roof, and a weathervane. There are two French windows, and the other windows are casements.	II
Swan Hotel; 52.31465°N 2.59455°W		18th century	The hotel is in brick, partly rendered, with roofs partly tiled and partly slated, and with two storeys. On the front are two projecting bow windows. The older one, to the right is rendered, and has a curved modillioned cornice and a conical roof. To the right is a wing containing a door with a cornice, flanked by Venetian windows, and in the upper floor are three sash windows with cambered heads. To the left is a later red brick bow window with sash windows and a parapet, and between the bow windows is a recessed doorway. Behind are extensive additions, giving an L-shaped plan.	II
Turnpike Cottage; 52.31301°N 2.60723°W	—	Late 18th century	A former toll house, it is in brick with a hipped and gabled slate roof. There are two storeys, a range parallel to the road with the end bays canted, and a rear range. In the end bay is a first floor niche, and the windows are casements.	II
Harp Bank Cottage; 52.31783°N 2.59877°W	—	c. 1795	Originally built for the Leominster-Stourport Canal, it was altered in about 1858 for the Shrewsbury and Hereford Railway Company. The cottage is in red brick with a tile roof. It has two storeys, a central gable on the front, and a single-storey outshut to the right. The windows are casements.	II
Milepost at NGR SO 5813 6839; 52.31224°N 2.61646°W	—	Early 19th century	The milepost is in cast iron, and has a triangular plan on a support post. On the angled top is the name of the parish, and on the sides is lettering indicating the distances in miles to Tenbury Wells, Ludlow, and Leominster.	II
Milepost at NGR SO 5940 6872; 52.31532°N 2.59699°W	—	Early 19th century	The milepost is in cast iron, and has a triangular plan on a support post. On the angled top is the name of the parish, and on the sides is lettering indicating the distances in miles to Tenbury Wells, Ludlow, and Leominster.	II
Tenbury and District Hospital; 52.31517°N 2.58991°W	—	Early 19th century	A house, later extended and converted into a hospital, it is in brick, rendered at the front, and with a hipped slate roof. There are two storeys, the original part has five bays, there is a late-19th century wing to the left, and extensive later additions to the right. In the centre of the original part is a metal tent-roofed porch on ornate ironwork columns, the windows are sashes, and in the upper floor of the left wing is a verandah.	II
Gates and gatepiers, Burford House; 52.30897°N 2.61359°W	—	19th century	The gate piers are in rusticated stone, and have corniced caps and pyramidal tops. The gates are in cast iron.	II
