= Geoffrey Hayes (disambiguation) =

Geoffrey Hayes (1942–2018) was an English television presenter and actor.

Geoffrey Hayes may also refer to:

- Geoffrey Hayes (cricketer) (born 1950), English cricketer
- Geoffrey Hayes (artist) (1940–2017), American artist

== See also ==
- Geoff Hayes (1933–1994), Australian politician
- Jeff Hayes (born 1959), American football player
