= Burford, Shropshire =

Village in Shropshire, England

Coordinates: 52.317°N 2.594°W

Burford
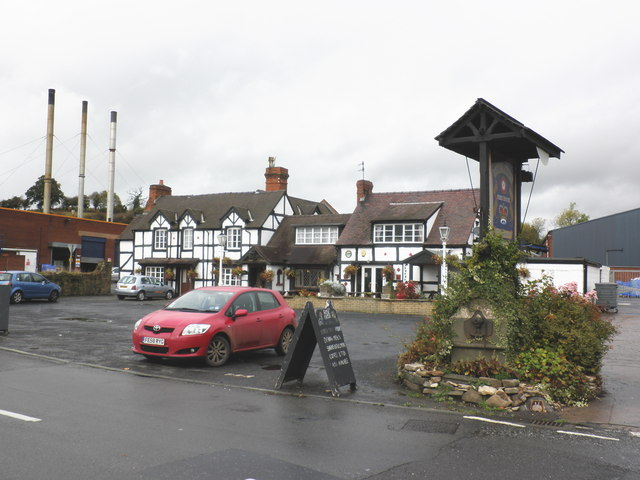
- Burford village

- Location within Shropshire
- Population: 1,392 (2011)
- OS grid reference: SO595689
- Civil parish: Burford
- Unitary authority: Shropshire
- Ceremonial county: Shropshire
- Region: West Midlands
- Country: England
- Sovereign state: United Kingdom
- Post town: TENBURY WELLS
- Postcode district: WR15
- Dialling code: 01584
- Police: West Mercia
- Fire: Shropshire
- Ambulance: West Midlands
- UK Parliament: Ludlow

Burford is a village and civil parish in Shropshire, England.

According to the 2001 census the parish had a population of 1,108, rising to 1,392 at the 2011 Census.

== Location ==
The parish is situated to the north of the River Teme, on the other side of the Teme is the Worcestershire town of Tenbury Wells. To the west, the A456 road bridges Ledwyche Brook, leading to the Herefordshire village of Little Hereford. To the northeast is the Shropshire village and parish of Boraston.

== Amenities ==
Burford House Gardens is a popular destination and is located in the southwest of the parish, where the Ledwyche meets the Teme.

Even though Burford has never been in Herefordshire or Worcestershire, the fire station is run by the Hereford and Worcester Fire Service and the Tenbury Community Hospital is run by the Worcestershire Health and Care NHS Trust. The workhouse serving Burford was built in 1837.

The local civic society (Tenbury and Burford Civic Society) covers Tenbury and Burford, underlining how these settlements form one community, despite being located in different counties.

The parish church is St. Mary's (photo).

There is a public house - the Rose and Crown.

== Notable people ==
- Elizabeth of Lancaster, Duchess of Exeter (1363–1426), daughter of John of Gaunt and ultimately wife of John Cornwall, 1st Baron Fanhope, born and buried at Burford Church.
- William Bowles (1686-1748), English glass manufacturer and Whig politician, builder of Burford House.
- George Rushout, 3rd Baron Northwick (1811–1887), Conservative politician, born at Burford (1811) where his father was then rector.
- Anna Eliza Williams (1873–1987), oldest person in the world in 1987
- Geoffrey Hayes (born 1950), cricketer
- The Hill (de la Hull/de Hull family) were associated with Burford in the medieval period

== See also ==
- Burford Rural District
- Listed buildings in Burford, Shropshire
