= St Mary's Church, Kyre =

Church of St Mary the Virgin
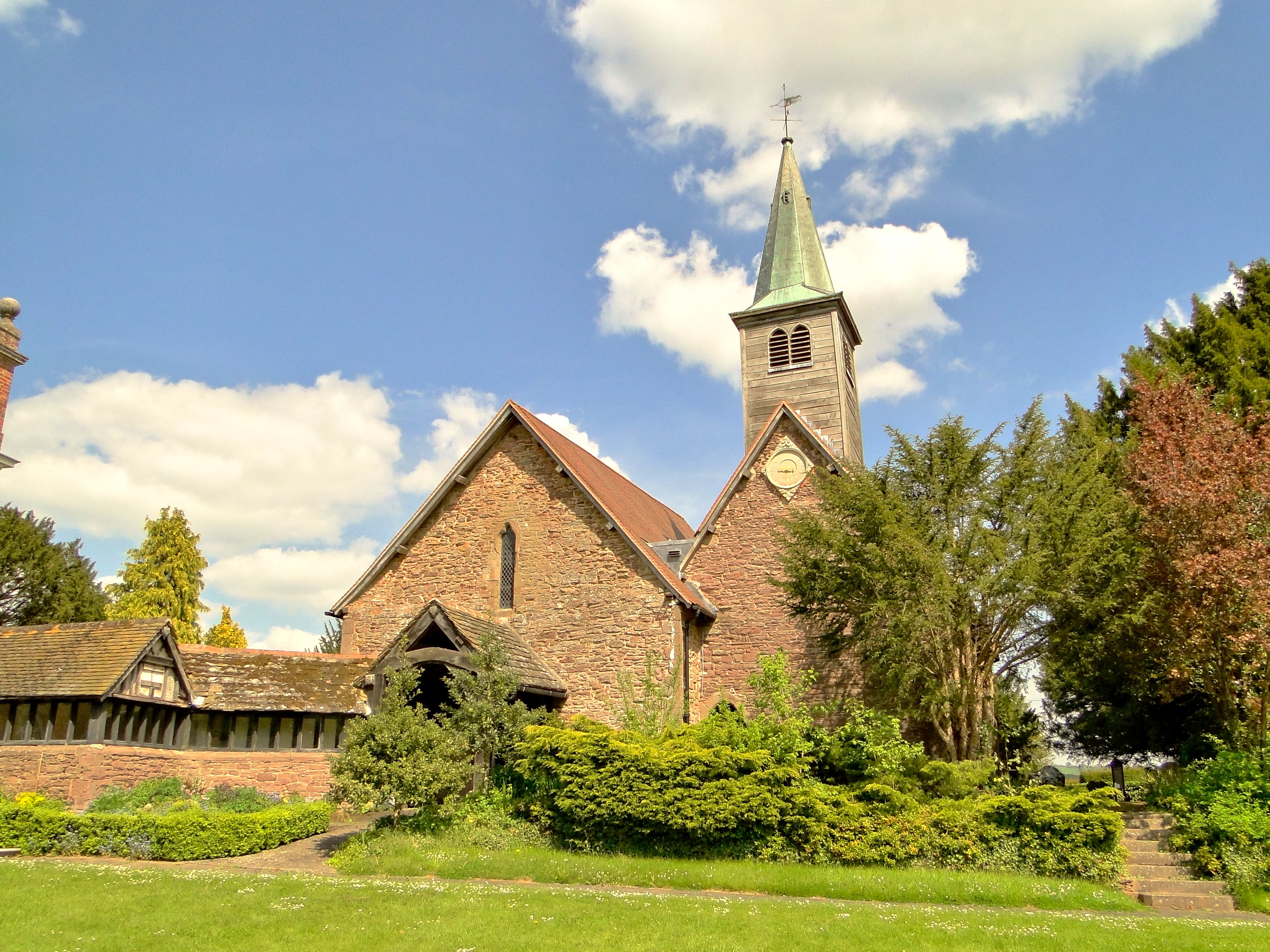
- Church of St Mary the Virgin
- 52°16′06.6″N 2°32′55.72″W
- OS grid reference: SO 62646 63515
- Country: England
- Denomination: Church of England
- Website: www.kyrepark.com/stmaryschurch

Architecture
- Heritage designation: Grade II*
- Designated: 18 April 1966

Administration
- Diocese: Worcester

St Mary's Church is an Anglican church in Kyre, near Tenbury Wells in Worcestershire, England. It dates from the 12th century, with additions of the 14th and 18th centuries, and was restored about 1833. It is in the Diocese of Worcester, and is Grade II* listed.

== History and description ==
St Mary's Church lies immediately to the south of the house at Kyre Park, and is joined to the house by a cloister built in the 19th century. The church is built of sandstone rubble, with ashlar dressing. The nave and chancel date from the 12th century; the chancel is not quite in line with the nave and inclines to the north. There is a south chapel, added in the early 14th century, when the roofs were replaced and buttresses were added to the eastern angles.

The bell-turret, above the west end of the chapel, was built about 1700. The original chancel arch was made wider in 1833. There is a timber-framed porch on the west side, built in 1894.

=== Interior ===
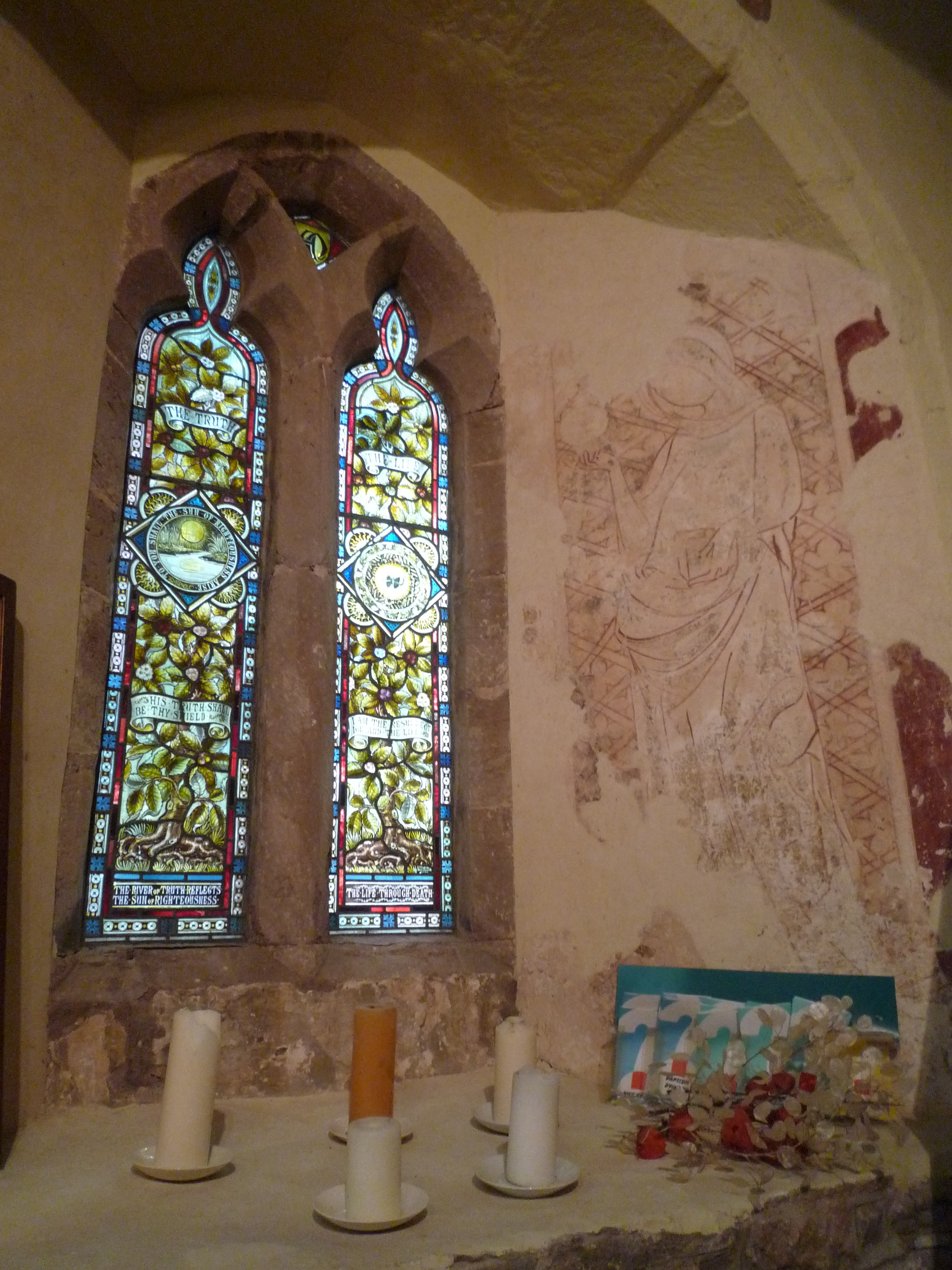
Wall painting on west jamb of south-west window

There is a 14th-century wall painting on the west jamb of the south-west window of the chapel, probably of the Virgin and Child. The font is 12th-century, with a modern base. There is a chest dating from about 1300, carved from a single oak log.

The pews are of oak and date from the 16th century, with 18th-century panelled ends. The altar table is of oak and dates from the 17th century; the alter rails are of about 1750. The stone pulpit is 19th-century. In the church is a copy of the Geneva Bible, printed in 1578.

Memorials include those to members of the Pytts family: these include, in the chancel, a marble monument to Catherine Pytts (died 1702, second wife of Samuel Pytts), and a marble monument to Edward Pytts (died 1672).
