= Tunstall, Kent =

Village in Kent, England

Coordinates: 51.33°N 0.72°E

Tunstall
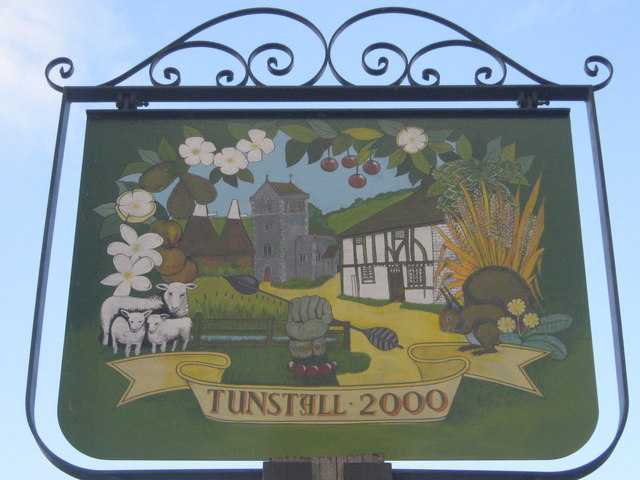
- Tunstall village sign

- Location within Kent
- Population: 884 (2011 Census)
- District: Swale
- Shire county: Kent
- Region: South East
- Country: England
- Sovereign state: United Kingdom
- Post town: Sittingbourne
- Postcode district: ME9, ME10
- Police: Kent
- Fire: Kent
- Ambulance: South East Coast

Tunstall is a linear village and civil parish in Swale in Kent, England. It is about 2 km to the southwest of the centre of Sittingbourne, on a road towards Bredgar.

== History ==
In 1798, Edward Hasted records that it had once been called Dunstall. This comes from the Saxon words dun, or dune, meaning a hill, and stealle meaning a place. It was recorded in the Domesday survey, mistakenly as Stealle.

At that time the parish covered around nine hundred acres of land (about 364 ha), of which about one hundred and forty were woodland.

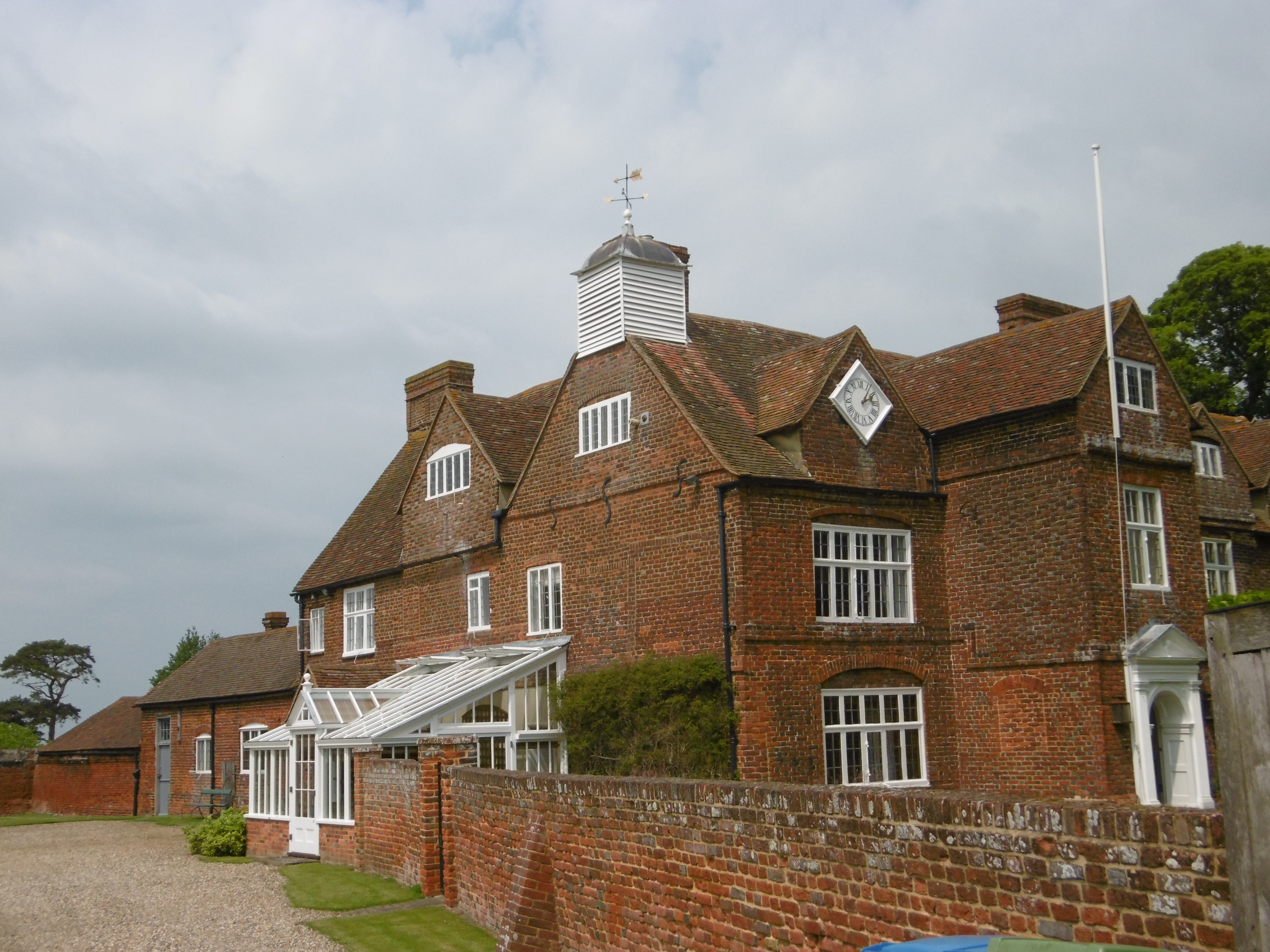
Tunstall House

In 1042, the manor was held by Osward (a Saxon chief) before being given to Odo, Earl of Kent (as the Bishop of Bayeux). After Odo's trial for fraud, the parish passed to 'Hugo de Port'. In the reign of King Henry II (1166), it passed to Manasser Arsic. In 1206, it was sold to Hubert de Burgh, Earl of Kent. His daughter Margaret (who was married at one time to Richard de Clare) inherited and she then passed it to her eldest son 'John de Burgo'.

In 1280, his son John died and his daughter, Margerie (who was married to Stephen de Pencester) inherited the parish. When Stephen died in 1303, Margerie married Robert de Orreby, with whom she had a son John de Orreby (a clerk). In 1347 it was sold to Sir Walter Manny. His only daughter Anne, the wife of John Hastings, 2nd Earl of Pembroke, inherited it after he died. His son, John Hastings, 3rd Earl of Pembroke later became the owner of the parish. It then passed to his cousin Reginald Grey, 3rd Baron Grey de Ruthyn. He sold this manor to John Drue, rector of Harpley, and John Seymour, citizen of London, who later sold it to Sir William Cromer (who was Lord Mayor in 1413 and 1423). His son William Cromer (who was High Sheriff of Kent in 1444). His son Sir James Cromer was also a High Sheriff. When he died in 1613, it passed to Christian, his youngest daughter, who carried it in marriage to John Hales (the eldest son of Sir Edward Hales, knight and 2nd baronet, of Tenterden). Then his grandfather Sir Edward Hales, 1st Baronet inherited the manor and it passed through various members of his family.

Also within the parish is Ufton, which was the family home of Sir Robert de Shurland (who also held Shurland Hall on the Isle of Sheppey). He possessed the manor in the reign of Edward I. He attended the prince in Scotland, to the siege of Caerlaverock, where he was knighted, and in 1300, he then obtained a charter of free warren for his manor of Ufton.

Another estate in the parish is Gore Court. This passed through many generations of the Gore family.

Another small manor is Pitstock, which changed its name to 'Woodstock'. (Note: Hasted explains the change thus: "PITSTOCK, usually called Pistock, is a small manor, situated in the south east part of this parish[Tunstall], adjoining to Rodmersham, which name has been for some years changed to that of Woodstock, by the present owner of it, as being of a more genteel sound.") Thomas Cheney (Treasurer of the Household) was an owner in 1572.

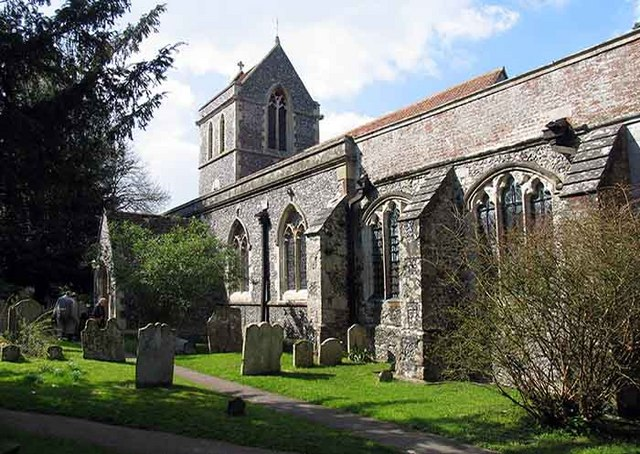
St John the Baptist Church

The church of St John Baptist is in the diocese of Canterbury, and the deanery of Sittingbourne. It is Grade I listed.

== Modern day ==
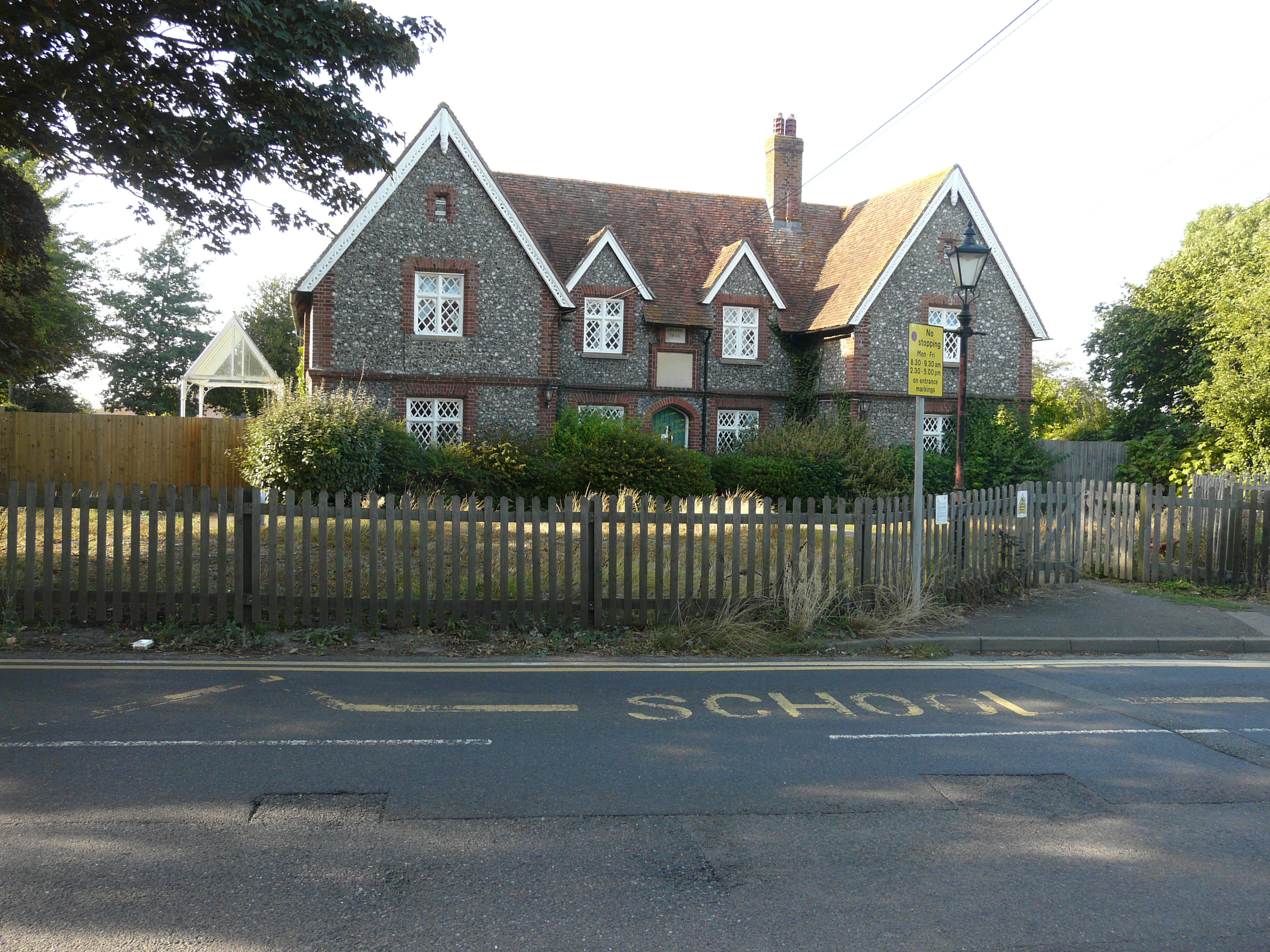
Former school premises

Notable sights include Tunstall Church of England primary school and a large village manor house, and a former police house which is now a private residence. Unusually for an English village, there are no shops or pubs within the village boundaries; these have been prohibited since the Middle Ages. The only amenity is a telephone box.

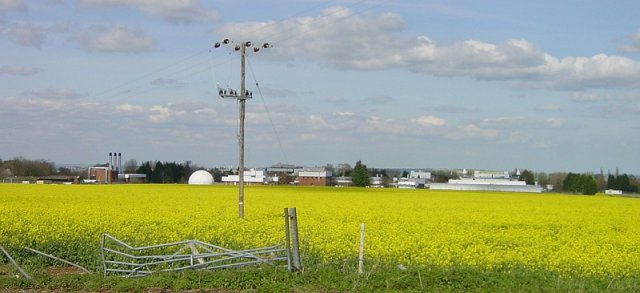
Kent Science Park

The Kent Science Park is in the parish, on a former Shell Research site.
