= Thomas Manny =

English nobility (1357-1362)

- Born: 1357; London, England
- Died: January 1362 (aged 4–5); Deptford, Kent
- Cause of death: Drowning
- Noble family: Manny
- Father: Walter Manny, 1st Baron Manny
- Mother: Margaret, Duchess of Norfolk

Thomas Manny, also known as Thomas de Manny or Thomas of Manny, was the only son and heir of Margaret, Duchess of Norfolk and Walter de Manny, 1st Baron Manny.

== Biography ==
Born in 1357 in London, England, he was the third son of his mother and only son of his father. He was heir to the office of Lord Marshal, Earldom of Norfolk and Barony of Manny. His two other half-brothers had died before being ten years of age; thus, he was his parents' only son.

Thomas died aged five. He drowned in a well in Deptford, Kent in January 1362. He was succeeded as heir of his father's barony by his full sister. Finally, their mother's titles were to be inherited by their older half-siblings and the descendants of them as their mother would die after the Manny title would become extinct.

=== Siblings ===
==== Half-siblings ====
From his mother's first husband John de Segrave, 4th Baron Segrave:

- Edmund de Segrave (died in the cradle)
- Elizabeth Segrave, 5th Baroness Segrave (1338–1368) married John de Mowbray, 4th Baron Mowbray, had issue.
- John de Segrave (13 September 1340 – 1349)
- Margaret de Segrave, Abbess of Barking

==== Full siblings ====
- Anne Hastings, Countess of Pembroke
