= St Mary's Church, Burford =

Coordinates: 52.3088°N 2.6126°W

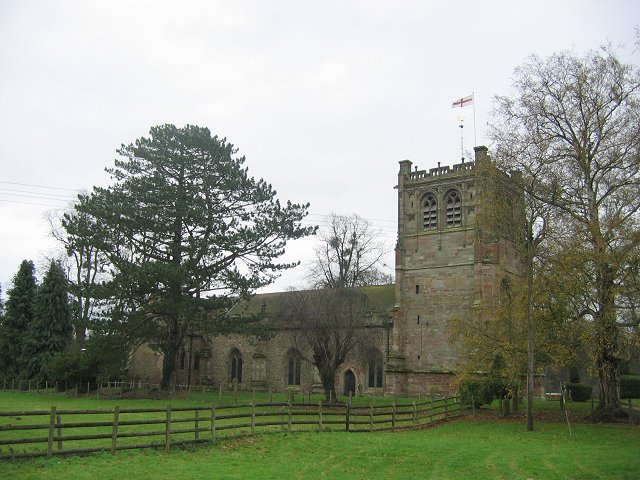
- St Mary's Church, Burford, from the northwest

- Location in Shropshire
- OS grid reference: SO 583 681
- Location: Burford, Shropshire
- Country: England
- Denomination: Anglican
- Website: Tenbury Team Ministry

History
- Status: Parish church

Architecture
- Functional status: Active
- Heritage designation: Grade I
- Designated: 12 November 1954
- Architect: Aston Webb (restoration)
- Architectural type: Church
- Style: Norman, Gothic, Gothic Revival

Specifications
- Materials: Stone, tiled roofs

Administration
- Province: Canterbury
- Diocese: Hereford
- Archdeaconry: Ludlow
- Deanery: Ludlow
- Parish: Burford 3rd portion

Clergy
- Rector: Revd Claire Ann Lording
- Vicar: Revd Sian Harris

St Mary's Church, Burford, is located near to Burford House in Shropshire, England, about 0.7 miles (1 km) to the west of Tenbury Wells. It is an active Anglican parish church in the deanery of Ludlow, the archdeaconry of Ludlow, and the diocese of Hereford. Its benefice is united with those of eleven other parishes to form the Tenbury Team Ministry. The church is recorded in the National Heritage List for England as a designated Grade I listed building.

== History ==
The oldest surviving part of the church is in the chancel, and dates from the 12th century, with the nave and tower from the 14th century. In 1889–90 the church was extensively restored by Aston Webb for the Honourable Georgina Rushout of Burford House. He largely rebuilt the tower, added buttresses and crenellation to the nave and chancel, and replaced the tracery in the windows. Inside the church he rebuilt the chancel arch and roof, adding carvings of angels.

== Architecture ==
=== Exterior ===
The church is constructed in stone with tiled roofs. Webb's additions are in Bromsgrove sandstone. The plan consists of a nave with a south porch, a chancel with a north vestry, and a west tower. The chancel contains Norman features. The nave is Decorated style, and the tower is Perpendicular. The tower has a west doorway with a window above it. In the top stage are bell openings consisting of pairs of louvred lancets.

=== Interior ===
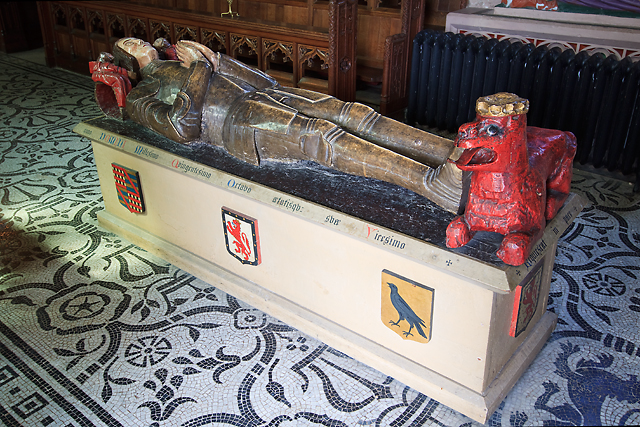
Monument to Edmund Cornwall

In the chancel is a canopied sedilia. By the south door is a medieval stoup. Most of the fittings in the church were designed by Webb. The font is octagonal in Perpendicular style. The chandeliers and other lamps in the church are "large and fantastic", the brass lectern includes a carving of the Virgin, the pulpit has carvings of the Doctors of the Church, and the reredos is in mahogany. Most of the stained glass is by Powell's, and dates from 1890 to about 1902. In the vestry is a panel composed of 14th and 15th-century tiles. Many of the monuments are to the Cornwall family, which were probably repainted in the 19th century; these date from the 14th to the 17th century. Later monuments are to the Rushout family and date from the 19th century; one of these is by Sir Richard Westmacott and another is by his son. A stone wall plaque on a marble shelf with relief carvings of cross, crown and palm leaves, is the parish war memorial to the dead of both World Wars.

== External features ==
To the south of the church is a medieval churchyard cross. Part of the original shaft is set on four octagonal steps. The upper part was restored in 1867 and incorporates carvings of the Crucifixion and the Nativity. It is listed at Grade II. The churchyard contains the war grave of a King's Shropshire Light Infantry soldier of World War I.

== Burials ==
- Elizabeth of Lancaster, Duchess of Exeter

== See also ==
- Grade I listed churches in Shropshire
- Listed buildings in Burford, Shropshire
