= John Cornwall, 1st Baron Fanhope =

English nobleman, soldier and chivalric figure

John Cornwall
- 1st Baron Fanhope and Milbroke
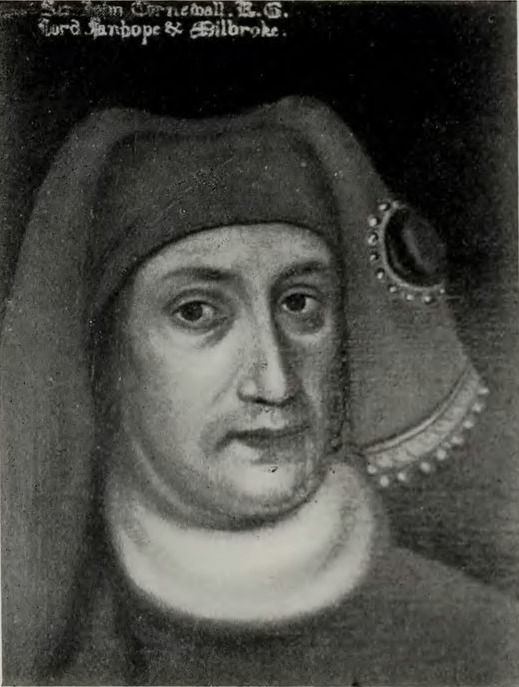
- Portrait, once in the possession of Cecil Foljambe, 1st Earl of Liverpool
- Born: c.1364 Mount's Bay, Cornwall, England
- Died: 11 December 1443; Ampthill, Bedfordshire, England
- Buried: Blackfriars, London
- Spouse: Elizabeth of Lancaster (m. 1400; died 1426)
- Issue: Constance Cornwall, Countess of Arundel; Sir John Cornwaille
- Father: Sir John Cornwaille

John Cornwall, 1st Baron Fanhope and Milbroke (c. 1364 – 11 December 1443; also spelled Cornewall, Cornwaille, Cornewaille, Cornouayl), was an English nobleman and soldier and one of the most respected chivalric figures of his era.

== Early life ==
Sir John was the son of Sir John Cornewaille, a great grandson of Richard of Cornwall, the son of King John. The senior Cornewaille had been in service to John V, Duke of Brittany, and his wife, a niece of the Duke of Brittany. He was born aboard a ship which was docked in Mount's Bay, in Cornwall, and baptised at Marazion, in England.

== Family ==
In 1400, Sir John married the widowed Elizabeth of Lancaster, Duchess of Exeter. Elizabeth was the daughter of John of Gaunt, the third surviving son of King Edward III of England, and the sister of Henry IV of England. She had previously been married to John Holland, 1st Duke of Exeter, with whom she had six children. John Holland was executed for conspiring to assassinate Henry IV during the Epiphany Rising. Sir John's marriage to Elizabeth caused some scandal as he failed to ask the king for permission to marry his sister, which resulted in Sir John's arrest. Their marriage was a happy and loving one.

Sir John and Elizabeth had a son and daughter together. The former, John Cornewaille, was born in 1403 and died in December 1421. Young John Cornewaille was only seventeen when he was killed at the Siege of Meaux. He died next to his father, who witnessed his son's head being blown off by a gun-stone. Sir John was deeply affected by witnessing the death of his son and heir, and vowed never to wage war on Christian princes. The couple's daughter was Constance Cornwall, who married John FitzAlan, 14th Earl of Arundel, and died in 1427. Neither of Sir John's children had any children of their own. Sir John was a father of two illegitimate sons by a "Mistress Ewen", John and Thomas, whom he recognised in his will. Elizabeth died on 24 November 1426 and was buried at St Mary's Church, Burford, Shropshire, England.

== Peerage and military career ==
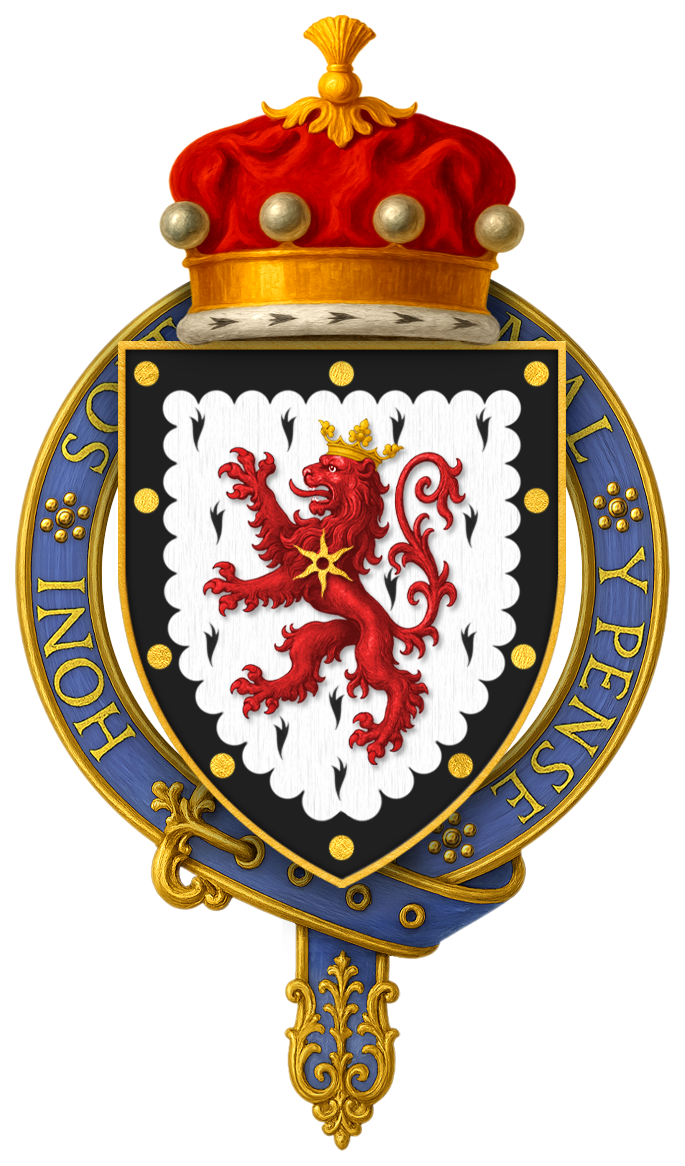
Coat of arms of Sir John Cornwall, 1st Baron Fanhope and Milbroke, KG

Sir John excelled in combat and was victorious in numerous tournaments, defeating many other knights in mêlée combat. During the Middle Ages, tournaments were regarded as the greatest test of a warrior's skill and valour; an idea reinforced by the prominent place that it occupied in popular Arthurian lore of the era.

As a soldier, Sir John had a long and distinguished career, serving in many campaigns. Early in his career, he served for King Richard II in Scotland, fought for the Duke of Lancaster in Brittany, and fought for King Henry IV against Owain Glyndŵr during the Welsh Uprising. Sir John continued his military service for King Henry V and King Henry VI during the Hundred Years' War, most notably during the Battle of Agincourt, where he led the English vanguard on the march from Harfleur. He also served as a diplomat to the Armagnacs in France for his brother-in-law, Henry IV. Sir John held great favour through his relation and service to Henry IV, Henry V and Henry VI. However, he came into conflict with Henry V when his 17-year-old son, also named John, "a fine and valiant squire", was killed during the siege of Meaux; the elder Cornwall was heard to bellow that Henry's war was proceeding "contrary to God and reason", and immediately departed for England, apparently swearing an oath never to fight again.

Sir John amassed a considerable fortune and a great deal of land during his lifetime. He accomplished this through his marriage with Elizabeth, victories in tournaments, and the spoils of war. At the battle of Agincourt, Sir John captured Guillebert de Lannoy, and Louis, Count of Vendôme, whom he ransomed for large sums for money; and from 1429 to 1432, Henry VI granted custody of Charles, Duke of Orléans to Sir John. He profited greatly from the ransoms of prisoners, and used the spoils to build Ampthill Castle, Bedfordshire, and to buy Oyster Hill Manor from the Mayor of London, William Walworth. Sir John also became heavily involved in the mercantile community in London.

King Henry IV made Sir John Cornwall a Knight of the Garter in 1409. He was created Baron Fanhope and a member of the King's Privy Council on 17 July 1433, and Baron Milbroke on 30 January 1442, by King Henry VI. Sir John's titles became extinct on his death, as he left no legitimate issue.

== Death ==
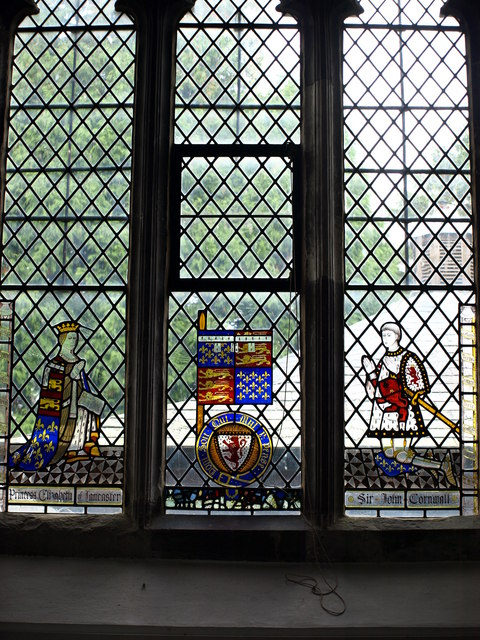
Modern stained-glass window in St Andrew's Church, Ampthill, showing Sir John Cornwall and his wife Elizabeth

Sir John died on 11 December 1443, at Ampthill Castle, in Bedfordshire, England. He was buried at Blackfriars Preachers, Ludgate, in Middlesex, England.

After his death, Ampthill Castle became royal property. Eventually, it was where Catherine of Aragon lived from 1531 to 1533, while Henry VIII was attempting to divorce her. Ampthill Castle is ruined now, and the friary, along with Sir John's tomb, was destroyed during the Protestant Reformation. Upon his death, it was discovered that Sir John was owed £2,989 in Exchequer tallies by the crown (roughly £1.48 million or $2.39 million in today's money).

The Church of St Andrew in Ampthill has Sir John and Elizabeth of Lancaster immortalized in stained glass windows.

== In fiction ==
Sir John features as a loquacious and plain-talking leadership character in Bernard Cornwell's novel Azincourt (U.S. title, Agincourt). In his historical note, Cornwell mentions that Sir John's last name is sometimes spelled "Cornwell", but is no relation to the author.

== External sources ==
- Leigh Rayment's Peerage Pages

== Bibliography ==
- Stow, John (2001). The Survey of London: Reprinted from the text of 1603. London: Adamant Media Corporation
- Reeves, A.C. (1981). Lancastrian Englishmen. Washington: University Press of America
- Arn, Mary-Jo (2000). Charles d'Orléans in England, 1415-1440. Cambridge: D.S. Brewster
- Burke, Bernard (1866). A genealogical history of the dormant, abeyant, forfeited, and extinct Peerages of the British Empire. London: Apple Manor Press (Reprinted 2007)
- Barker, Juliet (2005). Agincourt: The King, the Campaign, the Battle. London: Little, Brown ISBN 978-0-316-72648-1
- Cornwell, Bernard (2008). Azincourt. London: Harper Collins

Peerage of England
New creation	Baron Fanhope; 1433–1443	Extinct
New creation	Baron Milbroke; 1442–1443	Extinct
