= Burford House, Shropshire =

18th-century country house in Burford, Shropshire, England

Coordinates: 52°18′30″N 2°36′51″W

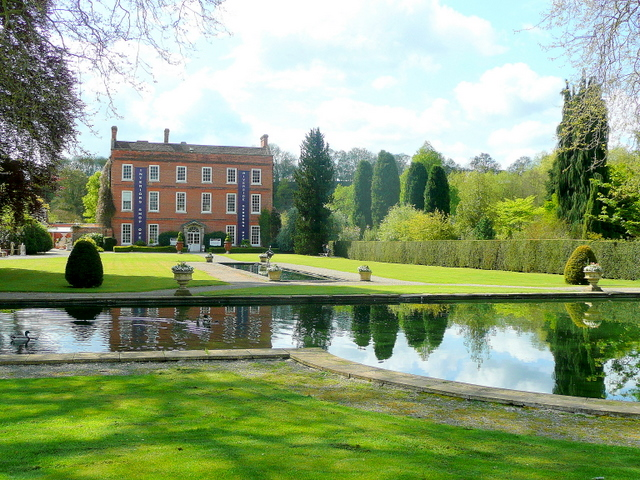
Burford House and gardens

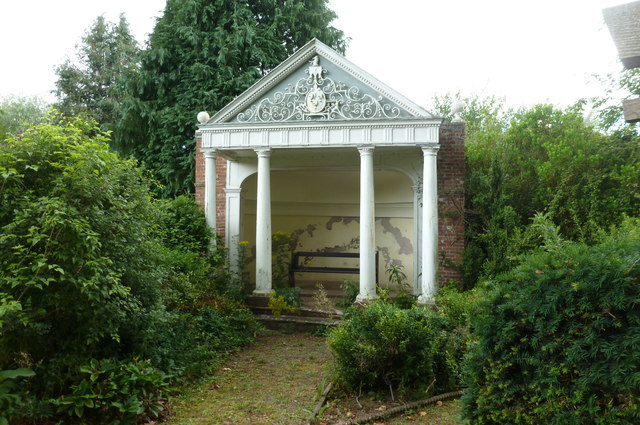
Summerhouse in Burford House gardens

Burford House is an 18th-century country house in Burford, Shropshire, near Tenbury Wells, Worcestershire, England. It now functions as a garden centre, cafe, garden and retail outlet.

Built in 1728, it is a Grade II* listed building, built of red brick to a double-pile plan with a six-window three-storey frontage. It stands in 3 hectares (7.5 acres) of ornamental gardens.

== History ==
The estate of Burford, which had belonged to the Cornwall family since the Middle Ages, was sold in 1720 to William Bowles for £35,000. Bowles was the proprietor of the Vauxhall glassworks in Lambeth, London, the largest glass works in the country, and was Member of Parliament for Bridport and later for Bewdley. He commissioned the building of the present house in 1728, extended the grounds and built a summerhouse (which is also listed Grade II*).

From the 1860s Burford was the home of George Rushout, 3rd Baron Northwick, a descendant of the Bowles family. During his time the house was greatly extended by the addition of east and west wings, which were demolished in the 1950s.

In 1954 the estate was purchased by Mr John Treasure and his brother, who demolished the added wings, completely replanted the gardens, and in 1958 opened the grounds to the public.

== Architectural details ==
A country house in red brick with bands and a tile roof with coped gables and parapets. There are three storeys and a symmetrical front of six bays, a double-depth plan, and a rear parallel extension. In the centre is a projecting porch with Greek Doric columns and an open pediment, and above the doorway is a fanlight. The windows are sashes with gauged brick lintels. Brick garden walls extend from the southeast corner of the house.

== See also ==
- Grade II* listed buildings in Shropshire Council (A–G)
- Listed buildings in Burford, Shropshire

== Sources ==
- Newman, John; Pevsner, Nikolaus (2006), Shropshire, The Buildings of England, New Haven and London: Yale University Press, ISBN 0-300-12083-4
