= Applefest =

Yearly village-wide food, entertainment and crafts fair

Applefest is a yearly village-wide food, entertainment and crafts fair, taking place in several towns in Canada, the United States and England.

== Canada ==
=== Brighton, Ontario ===
Brighton, Ontario's Applefest, founded in 1975, is held annually on the last full weekend in September. Events include BBQ's and breakfasts, entertainment, children's activities, dances, a street fair, car show, arts and crafts, and a parade.

== United States ==
=== Bayfield, Wisconsin ===
The Bayfield Apple Festival, established in 1962 & held in early October, was listed among "Top Ten Autumn Festivals in North America" by the Society of American Travel Writers in 2006. The 2021 festival (not held in 2020) will mark its 59th year, and in 2009 it attracted over 50,000 people. The city of Bayfield, Wisconsin, located on the southwest shore of Lake Superior, serves as the gateway to the Apostle Islands and was named by the Chicago Tribune as the "Best Little Town in the Midwest." Featured are classic apple fest activities such as an apple pie and apple peeling contests, live music, and a carnival. There is also an annual parade, over 150 arts and crafts booths, and Venetian boat parade in the harbor.

=== Warwick, New York ===
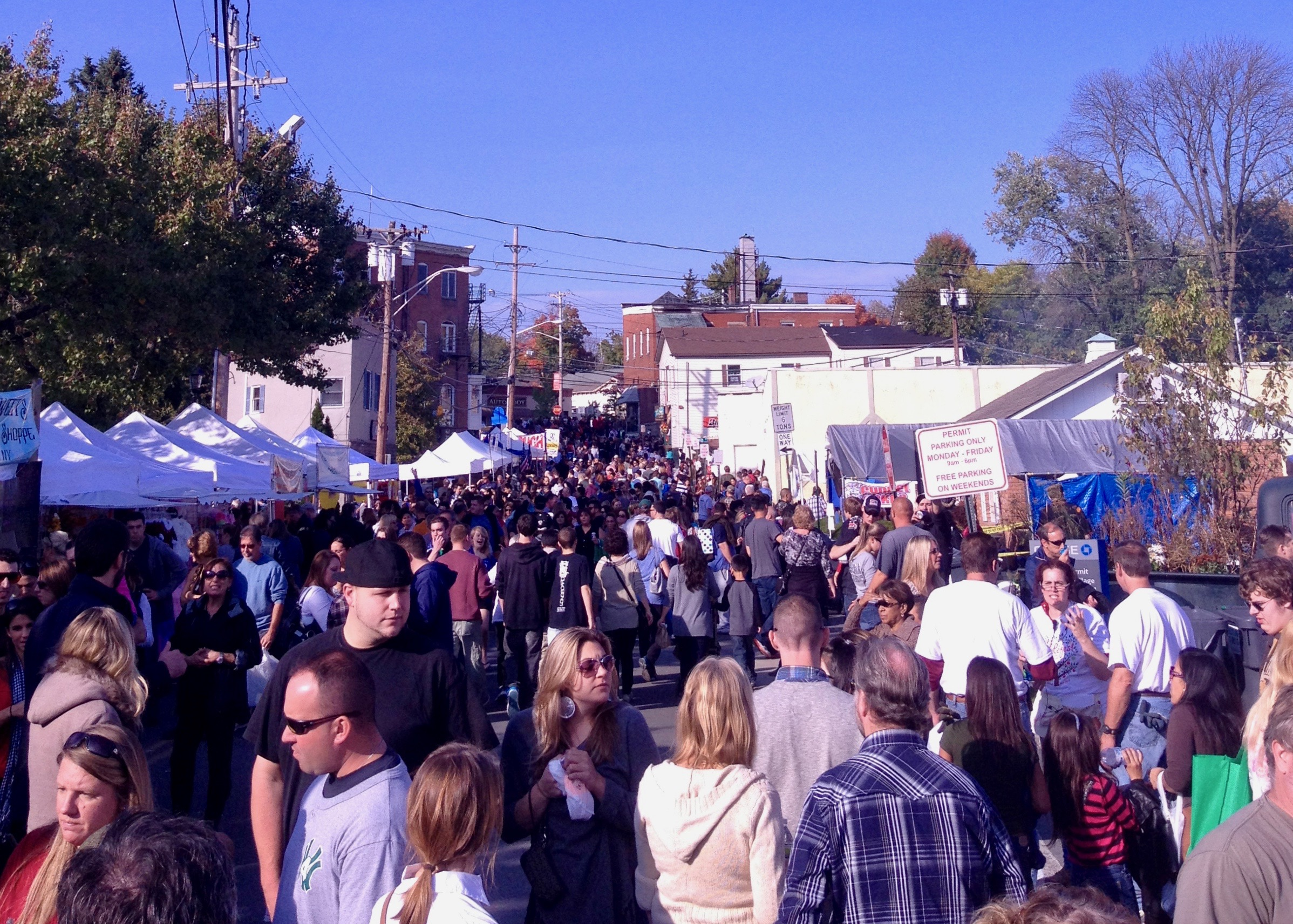
Warwick Applefest 2012

In Warwick, New York, Applefest is held on the first Sunday of October in the streets and parks of the village of Warwick, located in the Hudson Valley of New York. It attracts over 30,000 people each year, usually coming from points south, Northern New Jersey and the New York City area. In the past Applefest was voted by readers of the Times Herald-Record newspaper as the top "Family Event", and was named one of the top ten festivals in the "Top 100 Events in North American" by the American Bus Association. The festival features over 250 craft vendors displaying their handmade jewelry, stained glass, pottery, woodcarvings and more; dozens of food vendors offering traditional American favorites and more exotic ethnic cuisine; fifty local non-profit exhibitors; free music & entertainment; Farmers' Market, and a children's activities. Applefest began in 1989 as a simple harvest celebration, and is now produced by the Warwick Valley Chamber of Commerce. Festival proceeds benefit these and other local non-profit organizations.

=== Woodbine, Iowa ===
The Woodbine Applefest is always held each year on the last Saturday in September from 9-16:00. The 32nd Anniversary Applefest will return after a one-year hiatus in 2021. The event usually includes many vendor booths, a car show, a pancake feed, and a fun run, as well as many types of entertainment in the outdoor amphitheater. Admission is free.

=== Hilton, New York ===
The Hilton Apple Fest, located in Hilton, New York is also held in October each year and attracts approximately 70,000 visitors. The festival donates $5,000 per year on average to groups such as Ambulance Corps, local libraries, village parks, the Food Shelf, Camp Good Days and Special Times, the Historical Society, Braddock Bay Raptor Research, and other community center projects.

=== Franklin, Pennsylvania ===
Applefest is also a yearly three-day festival held in Franklin, Pennsylvania that starts the first Friday of October that attracts over 300,000 people. The three-day event is the largest crafts festival in western Pennsylvania.

The festival includes an apple pancake breakfast, apple-pie-baking and -eating contests, a 5K race, a car show, and more than 300 craft and vendor booths.

=== Wenatchee, Washington ===
Washington State Apple Blossom Festival attracts over 100,000 people a year in Wenatchee the self-proclaimed "Apple Capital of the World." It is the oldest major festival in the state of Washington. The Festival was born in 1919,

=== Cedaredge, Colorado ===
Music including folk, gospel, blues, country, rock, bluegrass and more as well as displays from local, regional and national artists begins daily during the festival at 10 am.

=== La Crescent, Minnesota ===
The La Crescent Apple Festival is a four-day festival celebrated the third weekend of September. The Apple Festival was founded in September 1949 with the purpose of promoting La Crescent and its apple industry. The first Apple Festival was a huge success, drawing a crowd of nearly 20,000 people, and the festival has grown in size and quality every year. All profits made from the festivals are given back to the community for various projects.

=== Nappanee, Indiana ===
The Nappanee Apple Festival in Nappanee, Indiana, begins on the 3rd weekend (including Thursday) of September of each year, continuing through the rest of the weekend, with preparations and road closures beginning Wednesday or Thursday. It is held on South Main Street (IN-19), West Lincoln Street, and sometimes a small portion of East Lincoln Street, as well as a small part of the Northwest portion of downtown. Located along West Lincoln Street, there is an entertainment tent with performances from bands, comedians, etc, as well as concessions and shops. Along South Main Street, there are rides and attractions from North Atlantic Midway Entertainment. Also, under the pavilion on West Market Street (US-6), there are various activities like shops or a stage. Other activities include a parade with a military flyover, a corn hole tournament, a record 7-foot-long pie, "Wings and Wheels" at Nappanee Municipal Airport, and more. They usually close the rides and attractions at 9pm on Thursday, 10pm on Friday and Saturday, and 5pm on Sunday, to make time for clean-up.

== Other Applefests ==
Other Applefests include the Tenbury Wells Applefest, held each year in October in Tenbury Wells in England, as well as others held in Clarksville, Missouri, Northborough, Massachusetts, Owensboro, Kentucky, Ellendale, North Dakota, and Ithaca, New York.
