= Walter Manny, 1st Baron Manny =

English soldier (c. 1310 – 1372)

- Born: c. 1310
- Died: 14 or 15 January 1372; Great Chesterford, Essex
- Buried: Charterhouse, London
- Spouse: Margaret Marshal, Duchess of Norfolk
- Issue: Thomas Manny; Anne Manny
- Father: Jean "le Borgne" de Masny
- Mother: Jeanne de Jenlain

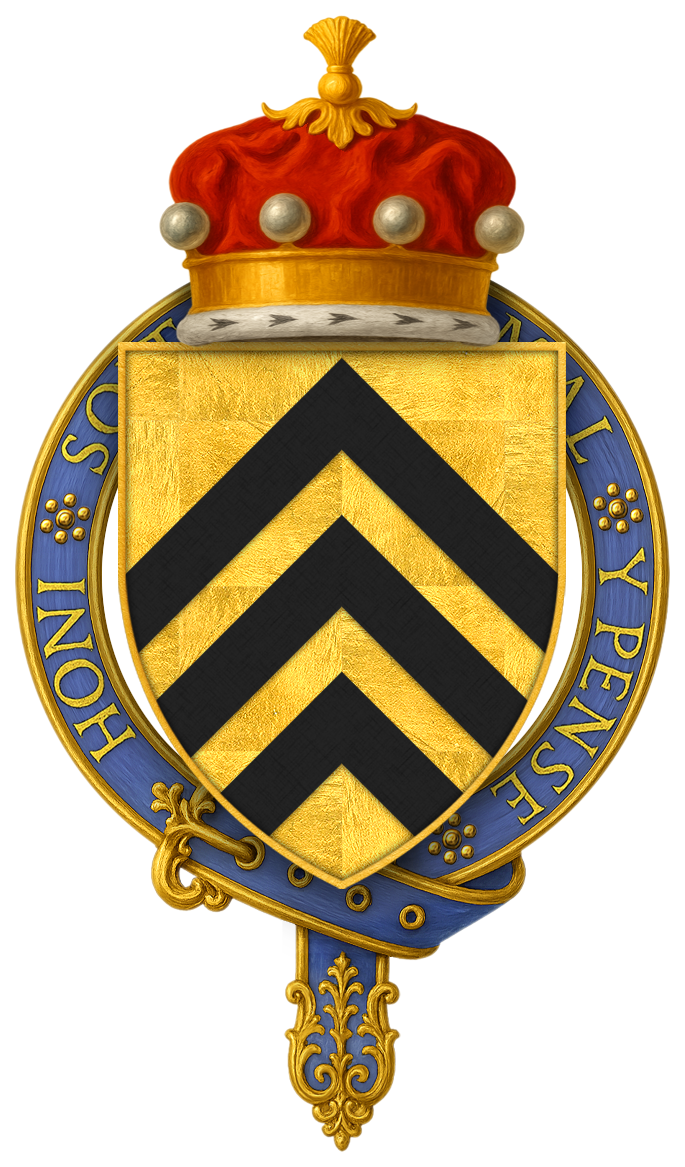
Arms of Sir Walter Manny, 1st Baron Manny, KG

Walter Manny (or Mauny), 1st Baron Manny, KG (c. 1310 – 14 or 15 January 1372), soldier of fortune and founder of the Charterhouse, was from Masny in Hainault, from whose counts he claimed descent. He was a patron and friend of Froissart, in whose chronicles his exploits have a conspicuous and probably an exaggerated place.

== Ancestry and early life ==
Born about 1310, Walter Manny was the fourth of five sons of Jean "le Borgne" de Masny and Jeanne de Jenlain. His father, who was Lord of Masny (situated some twelve miles west of Valenciennes), was slain in 1324 at La Réole near Bordeaux. In 1346 Walter recovered his father's body, and had it sent to Valenciennes for burial in the church of the Cordeliers. Jean le Borgne's epitaph refers to his son Walter as one "qui fut merveilles en armes aux gueres des Anglois".

Manny entered the service William I, Count of Hainault, and was in attendance on the Count's brother, Jean de Beaumont; it has been conjectured that Manny and his four brothers all likely grew up in Beaumont's household. Both William and Jean were brothers of Alice of Hainault, for whose soul Manny requested prayers in his will.

In December 1327, Manny came to England as a page in the household of Edward III's bride, Philippa of Hainault, Count William's daughter. Froissart describes him as the Queen's esquire carver, and Keeper of the Queen's Greyhounds.

== Military career ==
Manny played a distinguished role in the Scottish wars of Edward III, being present at the Battle of Dupplin Moor and the Siege of Berwick. He captured the pirate John Crabbe, whose expertise in fighting at sea would become of great value to the king.

In 1337 Manny was appointed Admiral of the Northern Seas, and in the following year accompanied King Edward to the continent, where in the campaigns of the next few years he proved himself one of the boldest and ablest of the English king's military commanders. On 11 November 1339, Manny's brother, captured in an ambush near the city, was lynched by a mob while being brought through Cambrai's northern gate. He distinguished himself at the Battle of Sluys.

Manny figured prominently in the defense of Brest during the Breton War of Succession. When Hennebont was besieged during that War, councillors tried to persuade the Montforts, led by Joanna of Flanders, to surrender to Charles of Blois, nephew of Philip VI of France. When she looked out a window, she saw the ships commanded by Manny sailing towards them. With the help of Manny and his small force, she managed to withstand the siege.

In 1346, after the Breton War of Succession, Manny was captured, despite having been offered safe conduct, and thrown into prison at Saint-Jean-d'Angély. He quickly broke out of prison and joined the Siege of Calais, where he negotiated with the governor, after Philip VI had abandoned the city. He asked for mercy for the Burghers of Calais, but Edward only granted this request when Queen Philippa added her pleas to his. Manny also took part in the expedition to defend the city once again in 1349, during that year's failed French Siege of Calais. According to Froissart, King Edward III and his son fought incognito under Manny's banner.

In 1347, he bought the parish of Tunstall, Kent.

Manny also took part in the campaigns of the Earl of Derby in Guyenne, being present at the battles of Bergerac and Auberoche. He was summoned to parliament as a baron by writ from 12 November 1347 to 8 January 1371. In 1359, he was made a Knight of the Garter, succeeding John, Lord Grey (died 1 September 1359), and at various times he received extensive grants of land both in England and in France. He was frequently employed by King Edward in the conduct of diplomatic negotiations as well as in military commands. He was one of those charged with the safe custody of the French king John II when a prisoner at Calais in 1360; in 1369 he was second in command under John of Gaunt in his invasion of France.

== Philanthropy ==
Manny is remembered for his share in the foundation of the Charterhouse in London. In 1349 he bought some acres of land near Smithfield, London, which were consecrated as a burying-place where large numbers of the victims of the Black Death were interred; and here he built a chapel, from which the place obtained the name of "Newchurchhaw." The chapel and ground were bought from Manny by the Bishop of London, Michael Northburgh, who died in 1361 and by his will bequeathed a large sum of money to found there a Carthusian convent. It is not clear whether this direction was ever carried out; for in 1371 Manny obtained letters patent from King Edward III permitting him to found, apparently on the same site, a Carthusian monastery called "La Salutation Mere Dieu", where the monks were to pray for the soul of Northburgh as well as for the soul of Manny himself. The bishop's bequest may have contributed to the building and endowment of the house; or possibly, as seems to be implied by a bull granted by Urban VI, in 1378, there were originally two kindred establishments owing their foundation to Northburgh and Manny respectively. At all events Manny, who died early in 1372, left instructions in his will, dated St Andrew's Day (30 November) 1371, that he was to be buried in the church of the Carthusian monastery founded by himself. During archaeological investigations at Charterhouse in 1947, W. F. Grimes discovered a skeleton in a lead coffin before the high altar of the monastic chapel. It was identified beyond reasonable doubt as Manny's by the presence in the coffin of a lead bulla (seal) of Pope Clement VI: in 1351 Clement had granted Manny a licence to select his own deathbed confessor, a document that would have been issued with just such a bulla attached.

== Family ==
At the beginning of 1354, Manny married Margaret, daughter and heiress of Thomas of Brotherton, a younger son of King Edward I, whose first husband had been John Segrave, 4th Baron Segrave. This lady, who outlived Manny by many years, was Countess of Norfolk and Earl Marshal in her own right, and in 1397 she was created Duchess of Norfolk. Manny's only son, Thomas Manny, died young. His daughter Anne, Baroness Manny in her own right, married John Hastings, 2nd Earl of Pembroke, and on the death of her only son in 1389 without children, the barony of Manny became extinct.

== Bibliography ==
- Oeuvres de Froissart, I. Chroniques, edited by Baron Kervyn de Lettenhove (Brussels, 1867–1877)
- Globe edition of Froissart's Chronicles (Eng. trans., London, 1895)
- Chronicon Angliae 1323-1388, edited by E. Maunde-Thompson (Rolls series 64, London, 1874)
- Philip Bearcroft, An Historical Account of Thomas Sutton and of his Foundation in Charterhouse (London, 1737)

Preceded by New Creation	Baron Manny; 1347–1372	Succeeded by Anne Manny, 2nd Baroness Manny
