= Kyre =

Village in Worcestershire, England

Coordinates: 52.267°N 2.549°W

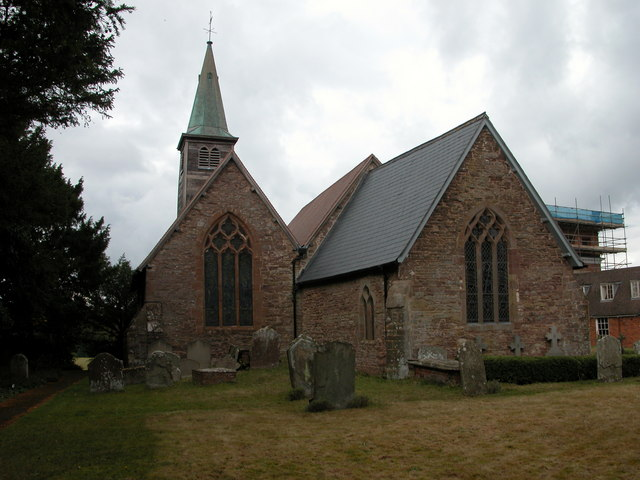
- St Mary's Church, Kyre

- Location within Worcestershire
- OS grid reference: SO626634
- Civil parish: Kyre
- District: Malvern Hills
- Shire county: Worcestershire
- Region: West Midlands
- Country: England
- Sovereign state: United Kingdom
- Post town: TENBURY WELLS
- Postcode district: WR15
- Police: West Mercia
- Fire: Hereford and Worcester
- Ambulance: West Midlands
- UK Parliament: West Worcestershire
- Website: Parish Council

Kyre is a small village and civil parish in the Malvern Hills district of Worcestershire, England, about 3.5 miles (6 km) south-east of Tenbury Wells. Other settlements in the parish are the hamlets of Nineveh (not to be confused with the Nineveh in Bayton parish) and Kyre Green.

Kyre is marked on some maps as the area around Kyre Park and the Grade II* listed St Mary's Church.

The parish shares its parish council with the neighbouring parishes of Stoke Bliss and Bockleton. Kyre Minor and Kyre Wyard were both in the upper division of Doddingtree Hundred.

== Kyre Park ==
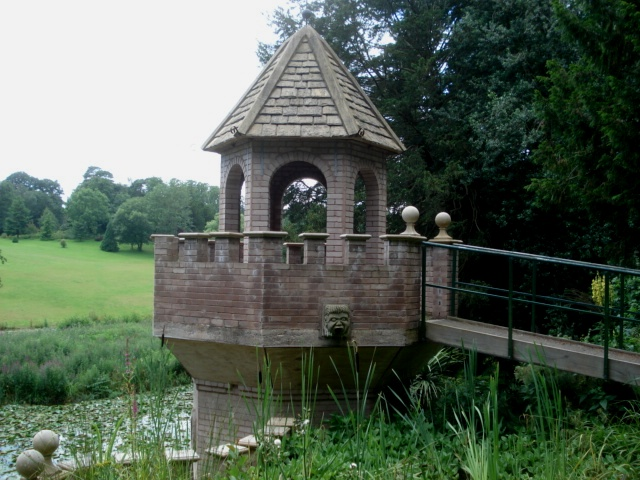
A folly in Kyre Park

Kyre Park is a park and gardens within the village which is known for being designed by Capability Brown. The park was used for hunting deer until the mid-1700s, when it was laid out for the Pytts family. It contains numerous follies and a Grade II listed barn dating from c.1618. The park is privately owned but is open daily to the public.
