= Eastham bridge =

Eastham Bridge
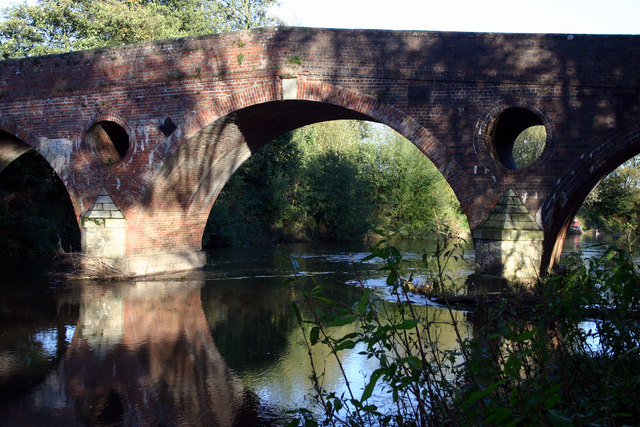
- The former bridge, in October 2006
- Coordinates: 52.318637°N 2.501386°W
- Carried: Minor road
- Crossed: River Teme
- Locale: Eastham, Worcestershire, England
- Named for: Eastham
- Owner: Worcestershire County Council
- Heritage status: Grade II listed
- National Heritage List for England no.: 1081429

Characteristics
- Material: Brick; Sandstone ashlar
- No. of spans: 3
- Piers in water: 2

History
- Construction end: 1793
- Collapsed: 24 May 2016

Location
- Interactive map of Eastham Bridge

Eastham bridge was a Grade II listed bridge over the River Teme at Eastham, near Tenbury Wells, Worcestershire, England. Built as a toll bridge in 1793, tolls ceased to be charged in 1907, when the bridge was purchased by Worcestershire County Council.

The listed bridge collapsed in 2016 and a replacement opened in April 2017.

The small village of Eastham is situated just on the south bank of the Teme, and the bridge connected that village and other settlements in its parish with the north bank, where the A443 and A456 main roads pass. The north bank is the civil parish of Lindridge.

== Listed bridge ==
The bridge was granted Grade II heritage status in October 1952, prohibiting unauthorised modifications. The list entry describes it as:

Part red brick, part red and blue brick with sandstone ashlar dressings. Three elliptical arches of regular size, the central one is larger than the outer two; the central and north arch have stone keyblocks; two circular flood outlets in central spandrels and short angled buttresses to central piers; two-course band beneath parapet which is splayed at both ends and terminated by square piers with pyramidal capping.

=== Collapse ===
On 24 May 2016, part of the bridge collapsed into the river. The county council at first said that the bridge would be repaired and that this would take a year or more; in the meantime, motorists, cyclists, pedestrians, and horse-riders who wished to cross the river had to undertake a ten-mile diversion. It was decided to demolish the remains of the bridge and build a new one rather than repair, due to costs and length of time that would be involved to undertake the required heritage repair.

== New bridge ==
Following demolition of the remains of the listed bridge in the winter of 2016/7, Worcestershire County Council are as of February 2017 constructing a single-traffic bridge of steel construction to permanently replace the old bridge. It opened to traffic in the spring of 2017.
