= Wilfred Shorting =

English cricketer

Cricket information
- Batting: Right-handed

Career statistics
Competition	First-class
Matches	9
Runs scored	165
Batting average	10.31
100s/50s	0/0
Top score	27
Catches/stumpings	2/–
- Source: Cricinfo, 8 November 2022

Wilfred Lionel Shorting (12 March 1904 – 10 October 1982) was an English first-class cricketer who played nine matches for Worcestershire in the 1920s.

With the exception of a single game against Hampshire in 1922, all Shorting's appearances came in 1925 and 1926. He batted variously at between three and eight in the order, but in the weak Worcestershire teams of the 1920s he rarely had much success, his highest score being the 27 he made against Nottinghamshire in his penultimate game in August 1926.

Shorting was born in Tenbury Wells, Worcestershire; he died aged 78 in Hastings, Sussex.
