= Elizabeth of Lancaster, Duchess of Exeter =

Elizabeth of Lancaster
- Duchess of Exeter; Countess of Pembroke
- Arms of Elizabeth of Lancaster
- Born: c. 1363–1364; Burford, Shropshire, Kingdom of England
- Died: 24 November 1426 (aged c. 61–63)
- Burial: St Mary's Church, Burford, Shropshire
- Spouse: John Hastings, 3rd Earl of Pembroke (m. 1380; ann. 1386) John Holland, 1st Duke of Exeter (m. 1386; died 1400) John Cornwall, 1st Baron Fanhope (m. 1400)
- Issue: Richard Holland, 2nd Earl of Huntingdon; Constance Holland, Countess of Norfolk; Elizabeth Holland; Alice Holland, Countess of Oxford; John Holland, 2nd Duke of Exeter; Sir Edward Holland; Constance Cornwall, Countess of Arundel; Sir John Cornwall
- House: Lancaster
- Father: John of Gaunt, 1st Duke of Lancaster
- Mother: Blanche of Lancaster

Elizabeth of Lancaster (bf. 21 February 1363 – 24 November 1426) was the third child of John of Gaunt, 1st Duke of Lancaster, and his first wife Blanche of Lancaster. Elizabeth was made a Lady of the Garter in 1378.

== Life ==
Some sources list her as having been born after 1 January 1363, but prior to 21 February 1363. She was born in Burford, Shropshire. In her childhood, she was raised in her father's royal household under Katherine Swynford, whom she held in high regard. She grew up a headstrong and spirited young woman compared to her more serious elder sister.

== Marriages ==
=== First marriage ===
On 24 June 1380, at Kenilworth Castle, she married John Hastings, 3rd Earl of Pembroke. She was seventeen years old and the groom was only eight. She was transferred to another household befitting her new rank as Countess of Pembroke. However, six years later, the marriage between Elizabeth and young Hastings was annulled.

=== Second marriage ===
By the age of 23, Elizabeth had tired of her 14-year-old husband. It is said that she had also been seduced by her cousin Richard II of England's half-brother John Holland, a known schemer, and had become pregnant by him. This forced her father to have her marriage annulled, and on 24 June 1386, at Plymouth, she hastily married Holland. Her father dealt with her leniently and favoured his new son-in-law, such was Holland's charm.

=== Third marriage ===
Holland, now bearing the title Duke of Exeter, was executed in 1400 for conspiring during the Epiphany Rising against his cousin, Elizabeth's brother Henry IV of England, who had by this time usurped the throne from Richard II. That same year, Elizabeth married Sir John Cornwall, 1st Baron Fanhope and Milbroke. Her marriage to Sir John caused some scandal, since Sir John failed to ask her brother for permission to marry Elizabeth. This resulted in Sir John's arrest. However, the marriage is said to have been a happy and loving one and they went on to have two children together, Constance and John.

Elizabeth died in 1426 and was buried at St Mary's Church, Burford, Shropshire.

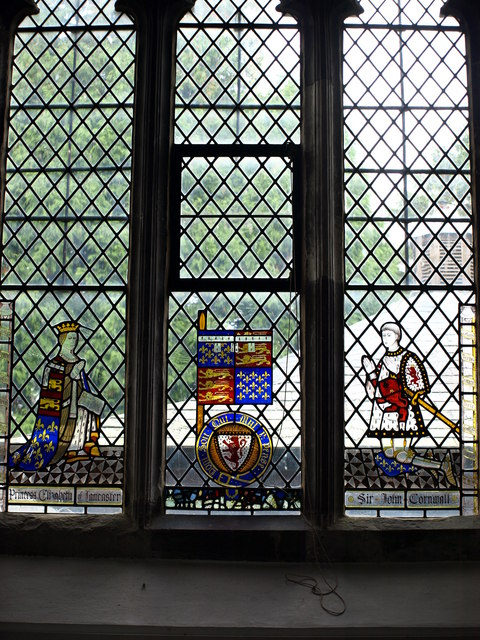
Modern stained-glass window in St Andrew's Church, Ampthill, Elizabeth of Lancaster and her third husband Sir John Cornwall

== Children ==
Elizabeth and John Holland had:

1. Richard Holland, 2nd Earl of Huntingdon (d. 3 September 1400), eldest son and heir, who survived his father only 7 months
2. Constance Holland (1387–1437) who married Thomas Mowbray, 4th Earl of Norfolk and Sir John Grey and had issue.
3. Elizabeth Holland (c. 1389 – 18 November 1449); who married Sir Roger Fiennes and had issue.
4. Alice Holland (c. 1392 – c. 1406) who married Richard de Vere, 11th Earl of Oxford; had no issue.
5. John Holland, 2nd Duke of Exeter (1395–1447), had issue.
6. Sir Edward Holland (1399–1413); had no issue.

Elizabeth and John Cornwall, 1st Baron Fanhope and Milbroke had:

1. Constance Cornwall (c. 1401 – c. 1427) who married John Fitzalan, 14th Earl of Arundel, but had no issue.
2. Sir John Cornwall (c. 1404 – 2 May 1422) was only seventeen when, in his father's presence, his head was blown off by a gun-stone at the Siege of Meaux. He had no issue.

== Sources ==
- Coleman, Joyce (2007). "Philippa of Lancaster, Queen of Portugal--and Patron of the Gower Translations?". In Bullón-Fernández, María (ed.). England and Iberia in the Middle Ages, 12th-15th Century: Cultural, Literary, and Political Exchanges. Palgrave Macmillan. pp. 135–166.
- Warner, Kathryn (2023). The Granddaughters of Edward III. Pen & Sword.
