= Pump Rooms, Tenbury Wells =

19th-century spring house, Worcestershire

Pump Rooms
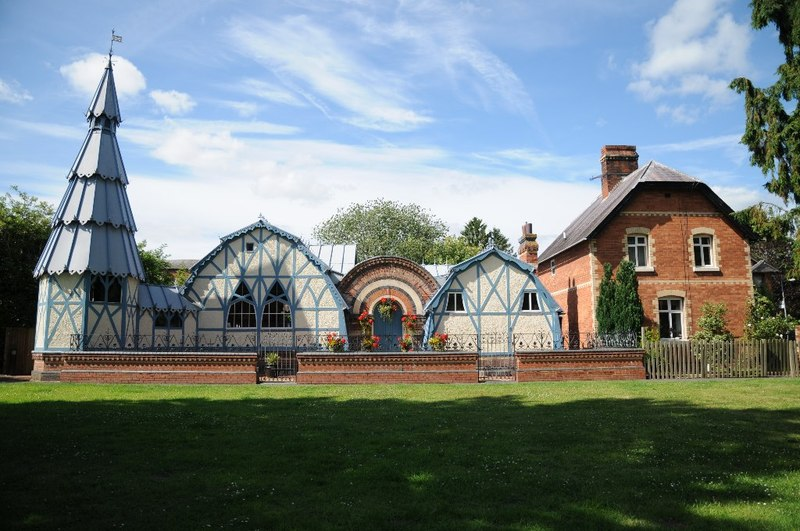

General information
- Status: Grade II* listed
- Location: Tenbury Wells, Worcestershire
- Country: England
- Coordinates: 52°18′40.320″N 2°35′33.864″W grid reference SO 59687 68288
- Completed: 1862

Design and construction
- Architect(s): James Cranston

Website
- www.tenburytowncouncil.gov.uk/The_Pump_Rooms_29905.aspx

The Pump Rooms is a building in Tenbury Wells, Worcestershire, England, dating from 1862. It was built to utilise the mineral spring discovered in the town and promote Tenbury as a spa town. It is now the location of the Town Clerk's office, and a registered venue for civil ceremonies. It is a Grade II* listed building.

== History ==
The mineral spring in Tenbury was discovered in 1839 by Septimus Godson, a landowner, as he searched for a source of drinking water. Augustus Granville visited in that year; he had written in 1837 The Spas of Germany, and went on to write The Spas of England and Sea-bathing Places in 1841. He analysed the mineral water, and advised Godson that Tenbury needed baths, pump rooms and other features such as promenades and hotels, to make it a spa town.

A small brick bath house was built by Godson in 1840, but it was unprofitable and closed in 1855. With the coming of the railway to the town, the "Tenbury Wells Improvement Company" was established in December 1860 by local businessmen, in order to build pump rooms that would attract visitors coming by rail.

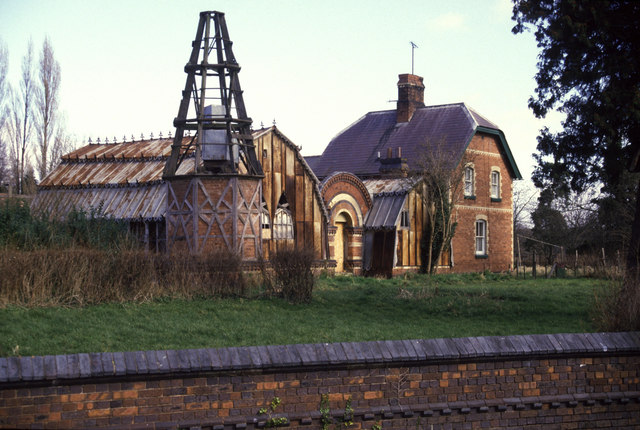
In 1988, before renovation

In 1862 the present Pump Rooms were built, on a site, owned by Godson, to the rear of the Crow Hotel. The architect was James Cranston, who had designed the Round Market, Corn Exchange and National School in Tenbury. It was influenced by greenhouses he had designed, in this case using sheet steel in place of glass panels. The building was described as Chinese Gothic.

Additional accommodation for visitors was built during the following years, including extensions to the Crow Hotel and to the Swan Hotel in the 1880s. After the First World War the Pump Rooms went into decline. It was bought in 1945 by the Wolverhampton and Dudley Breweries, owners of the Crow Hotel, and was given listed status in 1972. In 1986 it was bought by Leominster District Council. Restoration was subsequently carried out.

== Description ==
The central entrance, on the south side, is brick-built and has a round archway; to the left is the assembly room and to the right are the former brine baths rooms, both having sheet iron roof cladding. The pump room, to the left of the assembly room, is a small octagonal timber-framed building with a conical roof. On the extreme right is a two-storey brick building, described in the listing text as a reading room, which is now a house.

== Present day ==
The Pump Rooms are owned and managed by Tenbury Town Council. It is the location of the Town Clerk's office, and council meetings are held in the main Assembly Room. The Pump Rooms is a registered venue for civil ceremonies.
