= Round Market, Tenbury Wells =

Building in Tenbury Wells, Worcestershire, England

Round Market
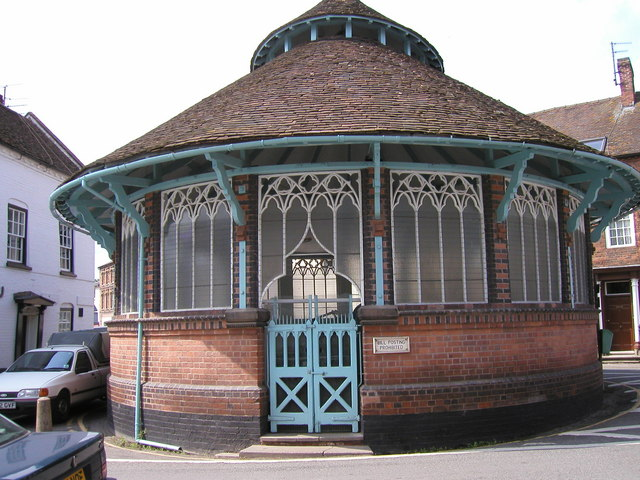

General information
- Status: Grade II listed
- Location: Tenbury Wells, Worcestershire
- Country: England
- Coordinates: 52°18′38.192″N 2°35′43.804″W grid reference SO 59498 68222
- Completed: 1858

Design and construction
- Architect(s): James Cranston

The Round Market is a building in Tenbury Wells, Worcestershire, England, dating from 1858. It is a Grade II listed building.

== History and description ==
The market hall, built in 1858 to provide a covered space to sell butter and other products, is situated in Market Square, the centre of the town at the junction of Market Street, Cross Street and Church Street. It was designed by James Cranston, the architect of the National School (1855) and the Pump Rooms (1862), both of which are listed buildings in Tenbury.

It is a brick single-storey building with a conical roof, and has a slightly oval plan. It is in Gothic style. Around the building there is a continuous row of four-light windows with tracery, and there are two entrances. Inside, the floor is paved with blue bricks in a herringbone pattern.

== Present day ==
The Round Market is open on Monday, Tuesday, Thursday, Friday and Saturday from 9.00 am to 3.00 pm. Products for sale include plants, fresh eggs, pastries and artisan crafts.
