= Siege of Meaux =

1421–1422 siege in the Hundred Years' War

- Part of the Hundred Years' War
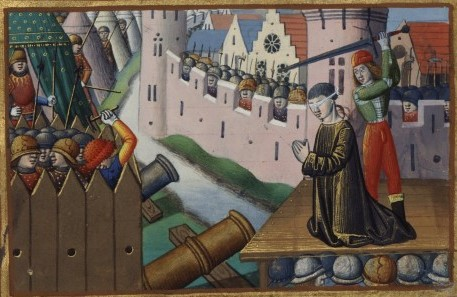
- Illustration from Martial d'Auvergne's Vigiles de Charles VII, 1484–1485
Date	6 October 1421 – 10 May 1422 (7 months and 4 days)
Location	Meaux, Île-de-France, France 48.9603°N 2.8883°E
Result	English victory

Belligerents
England	France

Commanders and leaders
Henry V of England	Bastard of Vaurus (executed)

Strength
More than 24,000 men	1,000

Casualties and losses
More than 6,000 men	Unknown

The siege of Meaux was fought from October 1421 to May 1422 between the English and the French during the Hundred Years' War. The English were led by King Henry V. Henry became ill while pressing this long siege, which took place during the winter months, and died on 31 August as a result.

== Background ==
Henry had returned from England in June 1421 with 4,000 troops, and he set off immediately to relieve the Duke of Exeter at Paris. The capital was threatened by French forces, based at Dreux, Meaux, and Joigny. The king besieged and captured Dreux quite easily, and then went south, capturing Vendôme and Beaugency before marching on Orléans. He did not have sufficient supplies to besiege such a large and well-defended city, so after three days he went north to capture Villeneuve-le-Roy. This accomplished, Henry marched on Meaux with an army of more than 20,000 men.

== Siege ==
Meaux was sited on a loop of the Marne, "with the walled city and its suburbs on the north bank and a smaller, heavily fortified area known as the Marché inside the riverbend, joined to the rest of Meaux by a single bridge." The place was "well vittled and also manned", held by a garrison of "one thousand diehard dauphinist troops." The town's defense was led by the so-called "bastard of Vaurus", by all accounts a "singularly vicious lord", but a brave commander all the same. He was rumoured to have tied "a heavily pregnant woman to an elm tree - his favourite execution spot - so that as she gave birth her screams attracted wolves, which ripped her to pieces and ate her newborn." The siege commenced on 6 October 1421 with mining and bombardment.

King Henry was aided by several of his ablest commanders, including the duke of Exeter, the earl of Warwick, and the earl of March, but his troops were "threadbare and not easily reinforced from Normandy". Arthur III, Duke of Brittany, recently released from an English prison, came there to swear allegiance to the king of England and serve with his Breton troops. However, Duke Philip III of Burgundy was preoccupied fighting on his own doorstep, and would not or could not contemplate coming to Meaux, "even to meet Henry in person, for many months." In Picardy, Jean de Luxembourg and Hugues de Lannoy, master of archers, accompanied by an Anglo-Burgundian army, attacked in late March 1422 and conquered several places in Ponthieu and Vimeu, despite the efforts of troops led by Joachim Rouhault, Jean Poton de Xaintrailles, and Jean d'Harcourt, while in Champagne, Antoine, Count of Vaudémont, was defeated in battle by La Hire.

Casualties began to mount in the English army, including John Clifford, 7th Baron de Clifford, who had been at the siege of Harfleur and the Battle of Agincourt, and had received the surrender of Cherbourg. Also killed during the siege was 17-year-old John Cornwall, only son of famous nobleman John Cornwall, 1st Baron Fanhope and a cousin of the king. He died next to his father, who witnessed his son’s head being blown off by a gunstone; distraught at the death of his son, Cornwall was heard to bellow that King Henry's war was proceeding "contrary to God and reason", and immediately departed for England, swearing an oath never to fight again. The English also began to fall sick rather early into the siege, and it is estimated that one in sixteen of the besiegers died from dysentery and smallpox, while thousands more died thanks to the courageous defense of the men-at-arms inside the city.

As the siege continued, Henry himself grew sick, although he refused to leave until the siege was finished. Good news reached him from England that on 6 December, Queen Catherine had borne him a son and heir at Windsor.

The walled part of Meaux on the northern bank of the Marne held out until March 1422, when starving and demoralised citizens opened the gates to the town. However, the defenders retreated to the Marché, where they held out for another two months. Only on 10 May 1422 did the siege come to an end, after a total of seven months, when the garrison threatened to rebel. The bastard of Vaurus was drawn through the streets and then decapitated "beside the tree where he executed so many others", as was a trumpeter named Orace, who had repeatedly mocked Henry "by blaring out an irritating tune" whenever he saw him walking among his men during the siege. John Fortescue was then installed as English captain of Meaux Castle.

== Aftermath ==
By this time, Henry was quite ill. Shortly after the siege, while en route to Cosne-sur-Loire, he found himself unable to ride, and had to be carried to Vincennes, where he arrived on 10 August. Henry V died at Vincennes 31 August 1422, aged 35.

== Bibliography ==
- Barker, Juliet R V (2010). Conquest : the English kingdom of France in the Hundred Years War. London: Abacus. ISBN 978-0-349-12202-1.
