= Eastham, Worcestershire =

Village in Worcestershire, England

Coordinates: 52.308968°N 2.491842°W

Eastham
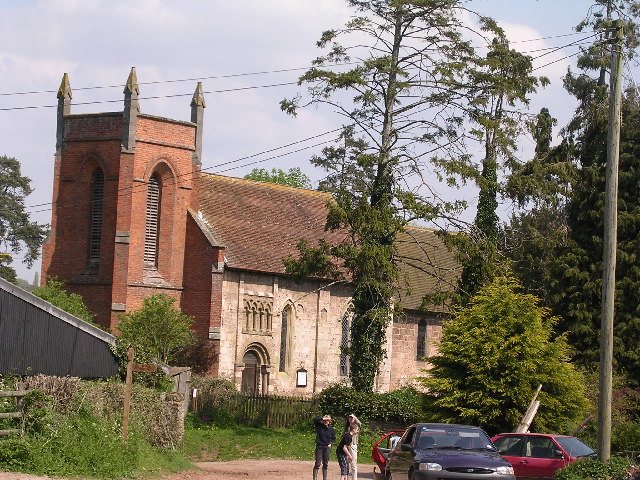
- Eastham church

- Location within Worcestershire
- Population: 254
- District: Malvern Hills
- Shire county: Worcestershire
- Region: West Midlands
- Country: England
- Sovereign state: United Kingdom
- Post town: Tenbury Wells
- Postcode district: WR15
- Dialling code: 01584
- Police: West Mercia
- Fire: Hereford and Worcester
- Ambulance: West Midlands
- UK Parliament: West Worcestershire

Eastham is a village and civil parish in the Malvern Hills District in the county of Worcestershire, England. It had a population of 254 in 2021.

Eastham was in the upper division of Doddingtree Hundred.

In 2016 Eastham bridge collapsed. The Grade II listed monument was demolished and a replacement bridge was constructed which opened on 27 April 2017.
