= John Hastings, 3rd Earl of Pembroke =

English nobleman (1372–1389)

John Hastings
- Earl of Pembroke; Baron Abergavenny; Baron Manny
- Born: October 1372
- Died: 30 December 1389 (aged 17); Woodstock, Oxfordshire
- Cause of death: Jousting accident
- Spouses: Elizabeth of Lancaster; Lady Philippa Mortimer
- Parents: John Hastings, 2nd Earl of Pembroke; Anne Manny, 2nd Baroness Manny

John Hastings, 3rd Earl of Pembroke (October 1372 – 30 December 1389) was the son of John Hastings, 2nd Earl of Pembroke and Anne Manny, 2nd Baroness Manny. He was also Baron Abergavenny.

== Biography ==
He succeeded his father as an infant in 1375, and also received lands from the death of William de Cantilupe the same year. He married Elizabeth of Lancaster the daughter of John of Gaunt, in 1380, but the marriage was unconsummated (he was 8 and she 17 at the time of the marriage) and was annulled after she became pregnant by John Holland, whom she subsequently married. He subsequently married Philippa Mortimer, daughter of Edmund Mortimer, 3rd Earl of March, but would have no children.

Richard II held his Christmas court at Woodstock Palace in 1389, and the seventeen-year-old Pembroke took part in the Christmas sports, including jousting. While running a course against Sir John Des, he was struck in the groin by his opponent's lance and subsequently died of his injuries. Upon his death, the Earldom of Pembroke and the Barony of Manny became extinct, while the Barony of Hastings passed to his cousin, John Hastings, 6th Baron Hastings. Also the manor of Tunstall, Kent passed to his cousin Reginald Grey, 3rd Baron Grey de Ruthyn. His cousins litigated for years regarding property rights, but resolution was delayed during the minority of Edward Hastings, 7th Baron Hastings, brother of the 6th Baron Hastings. Pembroke was described by the chronicler as being mourned by the common people as well as the nobility, by reason of his kind and generous nature.

== See also ==
- Inquisition Post Mortem #885.

Peerage of England
Preceded by John Hastings	Baron Hastings; 1375–1389	Succeeded by John Hastings
Preceded by John Hastings	Earl of Pembroke; 1375–1389	Extinct
Preceded by Anne Manny	Baron Manny; 1384–1389	Extinct
