= Geoffrey Hayes (cricketer) =

English cricketer

Geoffrey Hayes (born 13 August 1950) is an English former cricketer. He was a right-handed batsman and wicket-keeper who played for Shropshire. He was born in Burford, Shropshire.

Hayes, who represented Shropshire in the Minor Counties Championship between 1974 and 1975, made a single List A appearance for the side, during the 1974 season, against Essex. He failed to score a run in the match, but took a single catch.

At club level he has played for Worcester City.
