= Tenbury Community Hospital =

- Worcestershire Health and Care NHS Trust
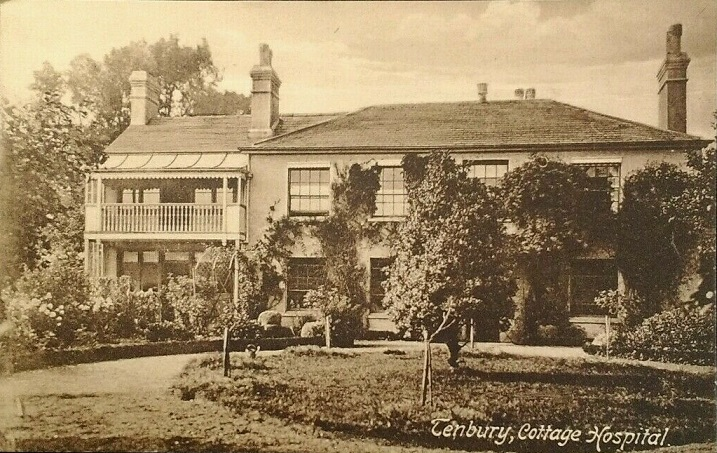
- Tenbury Cottage Hospital

- Location within Worcestershire

Geography
- Location: Worcester Road, Burford, Tenbury Wells, Worcestershire, England
- Coordinates: 52.3151°N 2.5898°W

Organisation
- Care system: NHS
- Type: Community

History
- Founded: 1869

Links
- Lists: Hospitals in England

Tenbury Community Hospital is a health facility in Worcester Road, Burford, Tenbury Wells, Worcestershire, England. It is managed by Worcestershire Health and Care NHS Trust. The facility is a Grade II listed building.

== History ==
The facility was established by converting an early 19th century cottage into a facility known as St Mary's Cottage Hospital in 1869. It became Tenbury and District Cottage Hospital in 1935 and, after joining the National Health Service in 1948 it subsequently became known as Tenbury and District Hospital and then Tenbury Community Hospital. The operating theatre closed in 2012 and the minor injuries unit became only accessible during daytime hours.
