= Anne Hastings, Countess of Pembroke =

English noble (1355–1384)

Anne Hastings
- Countess of Pembroke

2nd Baroness Manny
- Reign: 1375–1384
- Predecessor: Walter Manny, 1st Baron Manny
- Successor: John Hastings, 3rd Earl of Pembroke
- Born: 24 July 1355
- Died: 3 April 1384 (aged 28)
- Noble family: Manny
- Spouse: John Hastings, 2nd Earl of Pembroke
- Issue: John Hastings, 3rd Earl of Pembroke
- Father: Walter Manny, 1st Baron Manny
- Mother: Margaret, Duchess of Norfolk

Anne Hastings, Countess of Pembroke and 2nd Baroness Manny (24 July 1355 – 3 April 1384) was the daughter of Walter Manny, 1st Baron Manny and Margaret, Duchess of Norfolk.

In July 1368, she married John Hastings, 2nd Earl of Pembroke. They had one son, John Hastings, 3rd Earl of Pembroke. Her husband and father both died in 1375, and she became suo jure Baroness Manny (her one brother having died in his youth).

Shortly before her death in 1384, Anne was made a Lady of the Garter.

Peerage of England
Preceded by Walter Manny	Baroness Manny; 1375–1384	Succeeded by John Hastings
