= Tenbury Wells =

Town in Worcestershire, England

Coordinates: 52.31°N 2.59°W

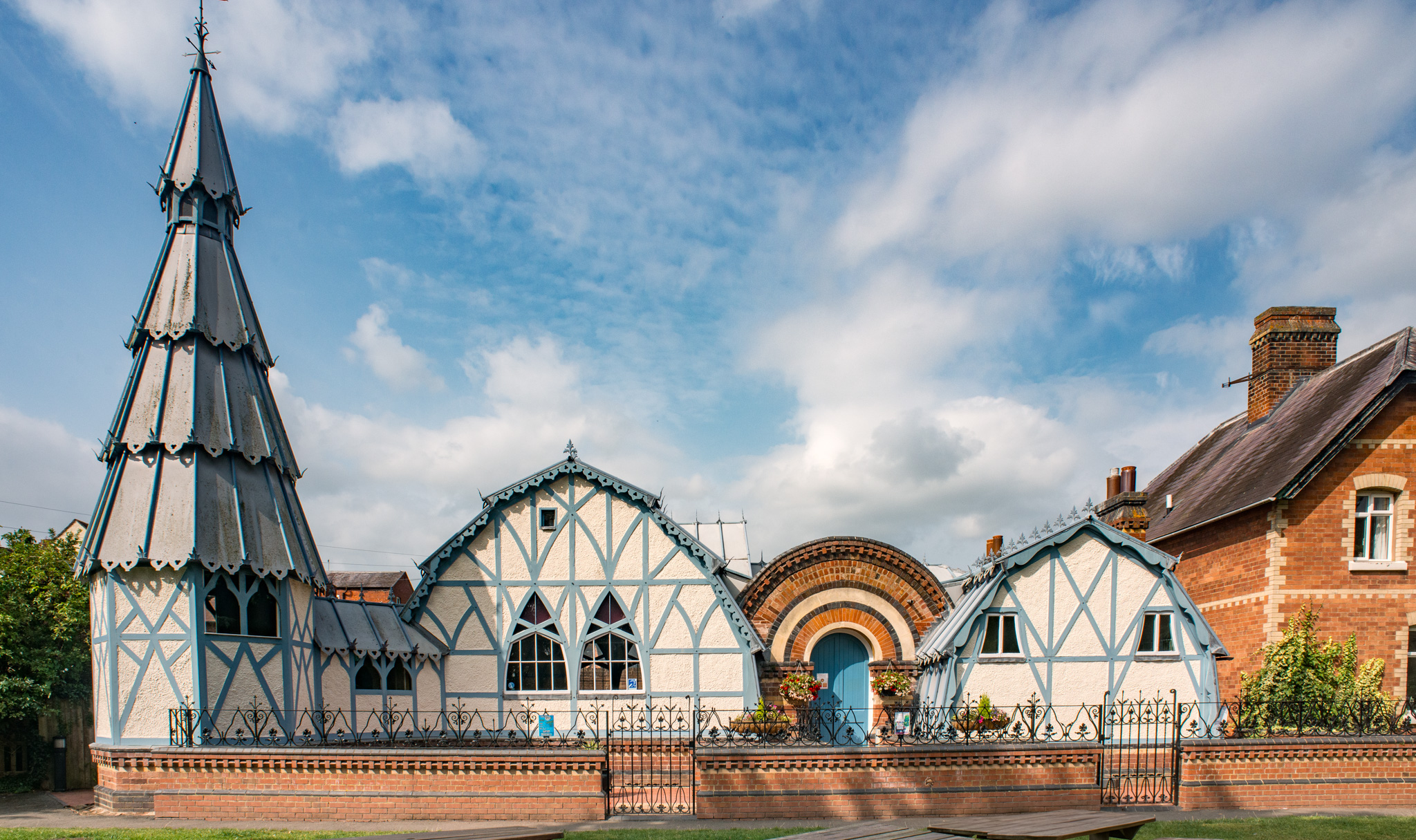
- The Tenbury Wells Pump Rooms

- Location within Worcestershire
- Population: 3,777 (2011)
- OS grid reference: SO595676
- Civil parish: Tenbury
- District: Malvern Hills
- Shire county: Worcestershire
- Region: West Midlands
- Country: England
- Sovereign state: United Kingdom
- Post town: TENBURY WELLS
- Postcode district: WR15
- Dialling code: 01584
- Police: West Mercia
- Fire: Hereford and Worcester
- Ambulance: West Midlands
- UK Parliament: West Worcestershire

Tenbury Wells (locally Tenbury) is a market town and civil parish in the north-western extremity of the Malvern Hills District of Worcestershire, England. Situated 6 miles southeast of Ludlow, its northern border adjoins Shropshire and, at the 2021 census jointly with Burford, it had a population of 5,224.

The town has become subject in the 2020s to almost annual very severe flooding.

== History ==
The history of Tenbury Wells extends as far back as the Iron Age. The town has been described as being the home of the Castle Tump, but the Tump is now in Burford owing to boundary changes. The Tump, possibly the remains of an early Norman motte and bailey castle, can be seen from the main road (A456) but there are no visible remains of the castle that was constructed to defend and control the original River Teme crossing. It has also been described as "... the remains of an 11th-century Norman Castle."

Originally named Temettebury, the town was granted a royal charter to hold a market in 1249. Over time, the name changed to Tenbury. A legal record of 1399 mentions a place spelt perhaps as Temedebury, which may be a further variation in spelling. Tenbury was in the upper division of Doddingtree Hundred.

The Wells element of the name was added following the discovery of mineral springs and wells in the town in the 1840s.

The arrival of the railways was a cause of great celebrations; a breakfast, carnival and ball were organised in Tenbury Wells in 1864 when the town was connected to the Kidderminster line. The name of the railway station, on the former Tenbury & Bewdley Railway, was changed to Tenbury Wells in 1912, in an attempt to publicise the mineral water being produced from the wells around the town.

The St Michael and All Angels Choir School devoted to the Anglican choral tradition by Frederick Ouseley closed in 1985, after which the buildings served alternative educational purposes.

For more than 100 years, Tenbury has been well known throughout the country for its winter auctions of holly, mistletoe and other Christmas products. It is also known for its Chinese-gothic Pump Room buildings, built in 1862, which reopened in 2001 following a major restoration. They are now owned by Tenbury Town Council, having been transferred from Malvern Hills District Council in September 2008.

=== Kyrewood Priory ===
Kyrewood Priory was a small priory which was founded in the 13th century. It was a monastic house of Augustinian canonesses, dedicated to St. Mary Magdalene.

Little is known about the history of Kyrewood Priory, as few records have survived from its time in operation. It is believed to have been founded sometime around the year 1238, likely by the noblewoman Margery de Sapy, who had a manor in the area. The priory was relatively small, with a community of only a few nuns, and it appears to have been financially supported by local landowners.

Despite its small size, Kyrewood Priory was known for its piety and good works in the local community; it attracted several donations of land and money over the years. However, by the time of the Dissolution of the Monasteries under King Henry VIII in the 16th century, the priory was in a state of decline and disrepair. In 1536, Kyrewood Priory was dissolved and its lands and buildings were sold off to a local landowner. Today, little remains of the priory except for a few fragments of stonework; the site is privately owned and not open to the public.

== Architecture ==
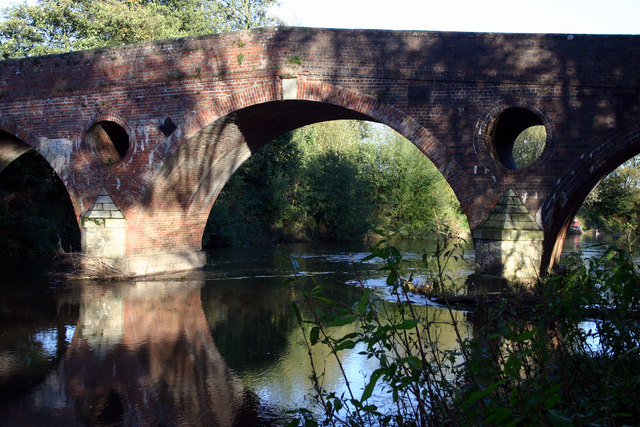
Eastham Bridge near Tenbury, which collapsed in May 2016

One notable architectural feature in the town is the unique (often described as Chinese-Gothic) Pump Rooms, designed by James Cranston in the 1860s, to house baths where the mineral water was available.

Other notable structures in Tenbury include the parish church of St Mary, with a Norman tower, and a number of monuments.

The part-medieval bridge over the River Teme, linking Tenbury to Burford, was rebuilt by Thomas Telford following flood damage in 1795.

The Grade II-listed Eastham bridge collapsed into the River Teme on 24 May 2016. There were no casualties.

The Victorian workhouse, designed by George Wilkinson, was used as the local council buildings from 1937 until the early 21st century and is currently being converted into residential housing. The Victorian infirmary behind the workhouse was demolished to create car parking for a new Tesco supermarket, which opened on 27 April 2017.

The unique Victorian corrugated iron isolation hospital was demolished on 24 October 2006.

== Geography ==
Tenbury Wells lies on the south bank of the River Teme; the river forms the border between Shropshire and Worcestershire. The settlement of Burford lies on the north bank of the river.

=== Flooding ===
For several centuries, Tenbury has been subject to flooding. In the past floods occurred about once a decade, but flooding became almost annual by 2020; the most recent floods as of December 2025 occurred in 2019, 2020, 2023 and 2024.

- In 2007 the town flooded when the River Teme and the Kyre Brook burst their banks.
- In 2008 a combination of 15mm (0.59 in) of rain falling in an hour and the town's drainage system (much of which was blocked) failing to cope created flash flooding. Flood damage was caused by a combination of the drainage not having been upgraded since the 2007 floods and the wall on Market Street (which should hold back the Kyre Brook) not having been rebuilt following the 2007 floods. Since then drainage was improved and defences were fitted in Market Street.
- In 2020 the River Teme and the Kyre Brook again burst their banks.
- Storm Bert caused flooding in November 2024, when the town centre flooded in the matter of minutes after the nearby Kyre Brook rose and caused a wall to collapse.

In the 2020s insurers no longer offered cover against flooding. While there are flood protection schemes in the UK, Tenbury was not included in a 2024–2026 scheme, and it was said that "one more deluge could bankrupt Tenbury Wells".

In December 2024 Jessica Murray asked in The Guardian "Could Tenbury Wells be the first UK town centre abandoned over climate change?", a question posed again the following year.

== Governance ==
From 1894 to 1974, it was a rural district, comprising the town itself and villages such as Stoke Bliss, Eastham and Rochford. From 1974, Tenbury was in the District of Leominster until it became part of Malvern Hills District when Leominster District Council was taken over by Herefordshire Council in April 1998.

== Local interest ==
=== Regal Cinema ===
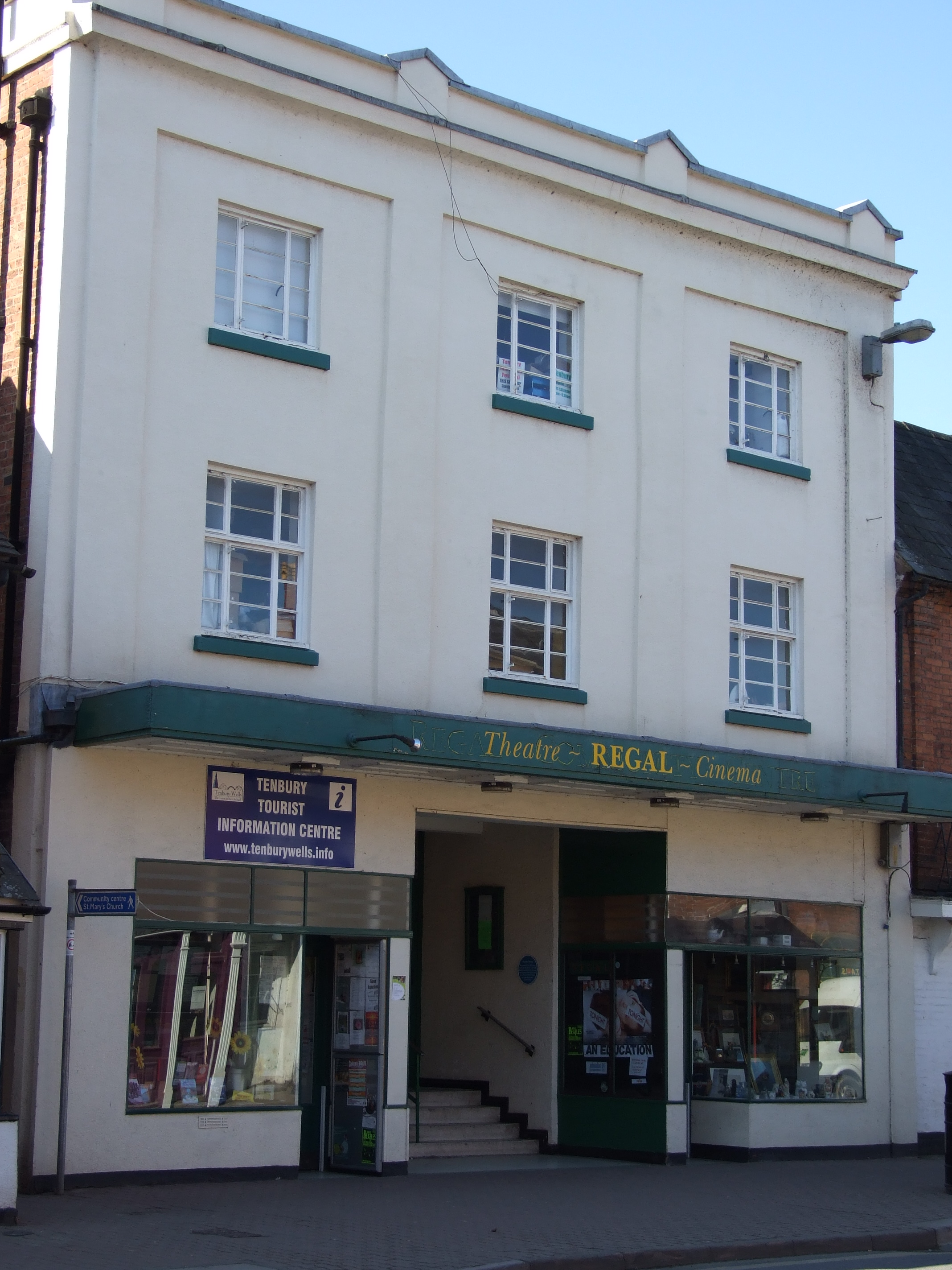
The Regal Cinema

The Regal Cinema on Teme Street in Tenbury Wells opened in 1937. It operated as a commercial cinema, one of six in the Craven Cinemas chain, until the decline of British cinema led to its closure in 1966. Following purchase by Tenbury Town Council to prevent demolition, various volunteer groups have run it.

The Regal has been the subject of a Heritage Lottery Fund supported restoration project. Replicas of the 1930s Mediterranean murals by artist George Legge have been painted around the auditorium; the detailing on the front of the building has been recreated and neon lighting has been erected on the front canopy.

The building, owned by Tenbury Town Council, is now under the management of a trust. Modern equipment now allows the showing of recently released films, live broadcasts and live acts. Magician Paul Daniels was its patron until his death in 2016.

In 2016, the Regal was nominated for the Britain Has Spirit award.

In 2020 the Regal suffered about £500,000 flood damage, and further insurance cover was no longer available, so that it may not be possible to restore it if flooded again.

=== Apple and fruit heritage ===
Tenbury was also known as "the town in the orchard" owing to the large numbers of fruit orchards of apple trees and also pear, quince and plum trees in the immediate vicinity of the town. This heritage is revisited every October at the Tenbury Applefest.

=== Markets ===
Until 2018, markets were held on Tuesday mornings, Friday mornings and Saturday mornings in and around the town's Round Market building, which was built by James Cranston in 1858.

=== Power station shelved ===
A proposal to build a biomass power station on a business park failed owing to residents' concern about the disruption to local businesses during its construction. The proposal continued to attract protests and, in July 2007, a petition against the plans was signed by more than 2,300 people. In July 2009, it was announced that the £965,000 grant offered to the power station had been withdrawn and the project shelved.

== Education ==
For primary education, the town is served by Tenbury CofE Primary School on Bromyard Road.

Tenbury High Ormiston Academy on Oldwood Road is the main secondary school for the area. The King's St Michael's College, a private international boarding school, closed in 2020.

== Transport ==
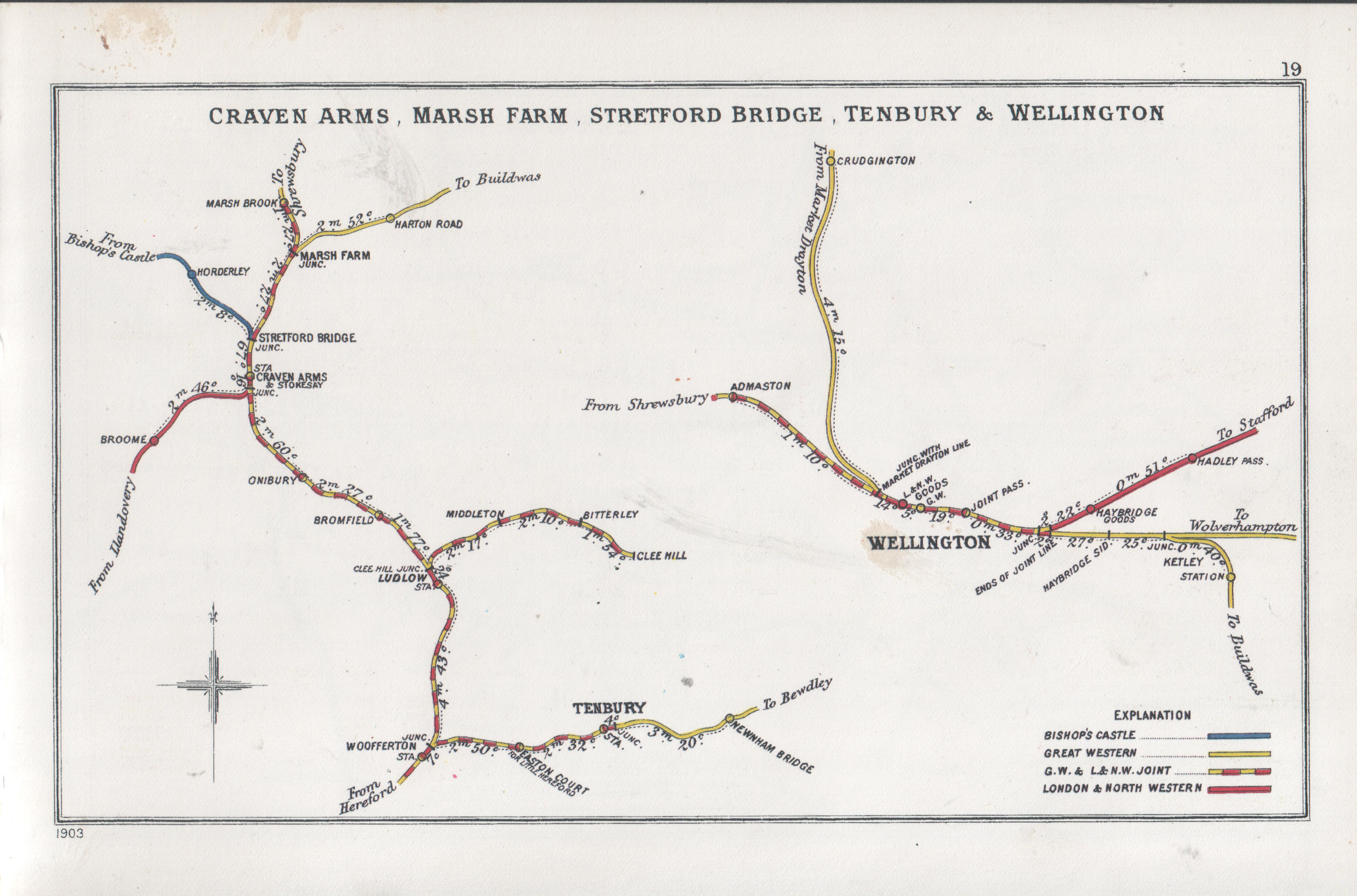
A Railway Clearing House junction diagram of 1903, showing Tenbury station

Tenbury Wells railway station served the town between 1861 and 1962, on the Tenbury Railway from Woofferton.

The nearest stations to the town are now at Ludlow and Leominster on the Welsh Marches Line. Transport for Wales operates regular services on the Welsh Marches line between Manchester Piccadilly, Crewe, Shrewsbury, Hereford and Cardiff Central.

Bus services in the area are operated by Yarranton Brothers, which connect the town with Bewdley, Kidderminster, Ludlow and Worcester.

== Media ==
=== Television ===
Local news and television programmes are provided by BBC West Midlands and ITV Central. Television signals are received from the Sutton Coldfield transmitter and the local relay transmitter.

=== Radio ===
Local radio stations are:

- BBC Hereford and Worcester
- Heart West Midlands
- Smooth West Midlands
- Radio Wyvern
- Capital Mid-Counties
- Greatest Hits Radio Herefordshire & Worcestershire
- Hits Radio Herefordshire & Worcestershire
- Carousel FM, a community based station.

=== Newspapers ===
The town is served by these local newspapers:

- Hereford Times
- Shropshire Star
- Ludlow Advertiser
- Teme Valley Times
- Tenbury Wells Advertiser

== Notable people ==
- Acton Adams (1843–1924), New Zealand politician; born at Willden Manor, Tenbury; his ashes are buried at St Mary's, Tenbury
- Sir Archer Baldwin MP, died at home there in 1966
- Dean Vincent Carter, author
- Thomas Goode (1835–1926), South Australian pastoral pioneer, born at Kyre Magna near Tenbury
- Ian Griggs, later Bishop of Ludlow, was priest-in-charge of the parish of Tenbury 1984–87
- Henry Hill Hickman, pioneer of anaesthesia, practiced as surgeon at Teme Street in the town where he died in 1830
- Jason King, DJ and television presenter, born at Tenbury
- Frederick Ouseley, composer, organist, and musical scholar; founder and first Warden of St Michael's College
- Wilfred Shorting, cricketer, born at Tenbury.

== See also ==
- Tenbury Community Hospital
