= Egypt (TV series) =

2005 British television docudrama series

- BBC DVD cover
- Also known as: Egypt: Rediscovering a Lost World
- Genre: Docudrama
- Written by: Ferdinand Fairfax
- Directed by: Tony Mulholland; Jonathan Rich; Ferdinand Fairfax
- Starring: Stuart Graham; Matthew Kelly; Elliot Cowan
- Narrated by: Andrew Sachs
- Composer: Stanislas Syrewicz
- Country of origin: United Kingdom
- Original language: English
- No. of seasons: 1
- No. of episodes: 6

Production
- Executive producer: Philip Dolling
- Producer: Paul Bradshaw
- Editors: Warren Meneely; Milena Tasso; Les Healey
- Running time: 60 minutes
- Production company: BBC Natural History Unit The Learning Channel ZDF France Televisions

Original release
- Network: BBC One
- Release: 30 October – 4 December 2005

Related
- Egyptian Journeys

Egypt is a BBC television docudrama serial portraying events in the history of Egyptology from the 18th through early 20th centuries. It originally aired on Sunday nights at 9 pm on BBC1 in 2005. The first two episodes explored the work of Howard Carter and his archaeological quest in Egypt in the early part of the twentieth century. The next two episodes focused on the eccentric explorer "The Great Belzoni" played here by Matthew Kelly. The final two episodes dramatise the discovery and deciphering of the Rosetta Stone by Jean-François Champollion (Elliot Cowan).

The music was recorded by the Warsaw Radio Orchestra and is featured on the CD Timeless Histories by Chappell music, produced by Clare Isaacs.

== Production ==
The series was a major new docudrama series produced by the BBC for the Autumn 2005 schedule.

"The whole idea behind the series was to be able to discover Ancient Egypt through the eyes of Howard Carter – famous for uncovering the tomb of Tutankhamun; The Great Belzoni – an amazing adventurer and explorer; and the scholar Jean-François Champollion, who was the first to decipher the Rosetta Stone and open up the meaning of hieroglyphics."

— Executive Producer Phil Dolling

In order to create a sense of "seeing the treasures of Ancient Egypt for the first time", Dolling and Bradshaw felt it essential to film at the actual archaeological sites referenced in the series.

"We had fantastic help from the Government and a local production crew, they managed to fix it for us to film in areas that, as far as we know, have never been used by other television or film productions."

— Series Producer Paul Bradshaw

"Being the first UK TV company to attempt such a project in the most amazing historical sights was very exhilarating, and to be able to return them - with additional sets and some computer imagery - to how they were during the time of the Pharaohs was incredible."

— Executive Producer Phil Dolling

Filming at such invaluable and popular sites created new challenges for the film makers.

"Keeping people out of shot was one — sometimes this was nearing impossible — but we tended to shoot early in the day so disruptions were kept to a minimum. The other was obviously making sure we didn't damage anything, which thankfully we managed!"

— Series Producer Paul Bradshaw

"It was difficult keeping such a unique project running so far from home, and it is a tribute to the cast and crew that we managed to succeed. The series really is great and looks fantastic, well worth all the hard work."

— Executive Producer Phil Dolling

The co-production between BBC The Learning Channel ZDF and France Televisions was initially budgeted at around £6.5m but problems filming on location in Egypt, including the weather and illness, meant the producers required another £2million. Post production costs involved in recreating Ancient Egypt meant that the final costs could have resulted in a £5million overspend but the BBC denied this.

"To suggest the overspend is anything in the [range of] £5m is utterly ridiculous — it is simply not true. This was a huge project shot on location in Egypt and, as with any project of such scale, we had contingency funds available to us — so the unavoidable overspend was accommodated for and fully authorised."

"I think it's useful to point out that the cost per hour of Egypt will still be lower than other comparable programmes such as Pompeii, Genghis Khan and Pyramid. In fact, due to the international co-financing, this is actually incredibly good value for money providing full period drama for the budget normally associated with a documentary."

— BBC controller of specialist factual, Keith Scholey

Several multi-media productions were commissioned to tie-in with the series including interactive drama BBC Egypt Interactive, award-winning online-game Death in Sakkara: An Egyptian Adventure, and an interactive exhibition at BBC Birmingham.

A companion series Egyptian Journeys with Dan Cruickshank, in which architectural historian Cruickshank travels the country to explore some of the intriguing stories that have emerged from ancient Egypt, was broadcast concurrently on BBC Two.

== Reception ==
=== Reviews ===
Sam Wollaston writing about episode one in The Guardian said that he "was expecting to hate this show," fearing it would be "narration interspersed with lame reconstruction," but he was pleased to discover it was, in fact, "a proper drama, with a very decent script and real actors." "And it's a great story, too," he states, although he did not enjoy the re-enactments of the life of Tutankhamun, which he described as "olive-skinned actors with non-speaking parts and an awful lot of eye-liner, wandering around in a semi-darkness lit by flickering candles," and claims were not necessary, "but maybe that will help to sell it to America." He concludes that he is "looking forward to part two."

David Liddiment writing in The Guardian complimented the cleverly twinning of this docudrama with the more cerebral Egyptian Journeys with Dan Cruickshank on BBC Two but he points out that this was done during the final stages of the BBC's charter renewal review and insists that the corporation should keep up standards after this process is completed.

=== Ratings ===
- Episode one (2005-10-30): 7 million viewers (29% audience share).
- Episode two (2005-11-06): 6 million viewers (24% audience share).
- Episode three (2005-11-13): 5.7 million viewers (23% audience share).
- Episode four (2005-11-20): 4.8 million viewers.
- Episode five (2005-11-27): 4.5 million viewers (18% audience share).

== Episodes ==
=== Part one: Howard Carter ===
The story of the discovery of the tomb of Tutankhamun by Howard Carter and the popular belief in the Curse of the Pharaohs, a supposed result of Carter's disturbing Tutankhamen's resting place. The episodes include short dramatizations of the life of Tutankhamun.

==== Episode one: The Search for Tutankhamun ====
Tutankhamun vanished from history in 1324 BC following his hurried burial and the erasure of his name from all monuments. In the winter of 1898 Carter is at the temples of Deir el Bahri recording wall reliefs threatened by a freak storm when he is thrown from his horse and makes a discovery in the sand. Retired Boston lawyer Theodore M. Davis funds Carter's excavation of Queen Hatshepsut's tomb but it is found to be empty and Carter deprived of further funding is reduced to selling his paintings to tourists on the street.

In 1905 Lord Carnarvon arrives in Luxor to convalesce after a road accident and is shown an artifact bearing the cartouche of the mysterious Tutankhamun discovered by Davis on his new dig. Tutankhamun succeeded his heretical father as pharaoh at the age of 8 and was named in honour of Amun to symbolise his mission to restore the old gods and save the empire from turmoil. An inspired Carnarvon employs Carter but they are denied access to the Valley of the Kings for which only Davis has a permit. Amidst the flurry of construction that marked the beginning of Tutankhamun's reign the most important to the boy Pharaoh would have been that of his tomb. An ailing Davis announces his discovery of this, the final Pharaoh's tomb, prior to his retirement. Carter doubts the find and convinces Carnarvon to take up the concession. The methodical and meticulous excavation commences in 1914 but is quickly interrupted by World War I.

The Carnarvons return to Egypt at the end of the war and Carter recommences his excavation but with a continued lack of results leading to doubts that any undiscovered tombs are left in the valley the funding is finally cut in 1922. Tutankhamun's tomb was well concealed to ensure his undisturbed afterlife. Carter convinces Carnarvon to fund one last season during which the tomb is finally unearthed. When the tomb is opened in the presence of Carnarvon and his daughter it is revealed to be the only unplundered pharaoh's tomb in the valley.

==== Episode two: The Curse of Tutankhamun ====
In 1922 Carter goes to the Egyptian Antiquities Service in Cairo to announce his discovery but disagrees with Director Pierre Lacau over the clearance and cataloguing of the contents. The discovery revealed a dark time in the history of Egypt and the death of its boy king. Carter assembles an international team of experts to commence the work under the unwelcome scrutiny of Lacau's inspector and the western press. Carnarvon's cavalier attitude to the finds he considers his property starts to infuriate both Carter and Lacau.

As the finds are slowly catalogued and removed Carter becomes close to Carnarvon's daughter Lady Evelyn but his strictness begins to alienate his team. Tutankhamun was married to his own sister but the union failed to produce an heir to secure the future of the kingdom. Stories of the curse begin to circulate as Carter breaks through into the burial chamber to reveal an intact tomb. As Lacau threatens to take over the excavation and several of the experts quit, Carnarvon questions Carter over his leadership and his relationship with Evelyn. When he came of age Tutankhamun took over control of the kingdom from his military advisor Ay only to die from unknown causes shortly thereafter. Carter rushes to Carnarvon's death-bed where the two make-up. Upon Tutankhamun's death Ay seized the throne and married the widowed queen. Carter, disappointed by Evelyn's engagement to another man, returns to continue his work. Tutankhamun's death came before the royal tomb could be completed so he was hastily buried in the tomb Ay had prepared for himself. Lacau takes over the running of the tomb in 1924 when Carter and his team stop work to protest continued Egyptian interference.

The following year Carter is called back by Lacau to reopen the tomb with funding from Lady Carnarvon. The team start to extract the nested coffins revealing one of them to be made of pure gold that confirms the presence of a Pharaoh. The team begin to notice evidence that the burial was done in a hurry as the body itself is finally uncovered. When Ay died without heir a new dynasty took to the throne that erased all references to the Boy King. In 1932 with his work complete Carter leaves the tomb for the last time and hands the key to Lacau.

==== Cast ====
- Stuart Graham as Howard Carter
- Julian Wadham as Lord Carnarvon
- Caroline Langrishe as Lady Carnarvon
- Alex Weaver as Lady Evelyn Herbert
- Valentine Pelka as Pierre Lacau
- William Hope as Theodore M. Davis
- Laurence Fox as Leonard

=== Part two: The Great Belzoni ===
The story of Italian engineer and circus strongman Giovanni Belzoni who became the most unlikely Egyptologist the world has ever seen, intercut with Flashbacks to the life of Ramses the Great, in whose footsteps Belzoni would continually stray.

==== Episode three: The Pharaoh and the Showman ====
A dissatisfied Belzoni leaves England with his wife, Sarah, and servant, James Curtin, to see the world. Finding themselves destitute in the streets of Cairo after work on an irrigation project falls through, they are rescued by the eccentric John Lewis Bukhardt who introduces them to British Consul Henry Salt. Belzoni is hired to recover the massive Head of Memnon, later revealed to a statue of the Pharaoh Ramesses the Great, as a gift for the British Museum. Arriving in Luxor in 1816 amidst a gold rush of black market antiquities dealers Belzoni finds himself unwelcome.

At the Ramesseum Belzoni examines the head and devises a plan for its removal. The local Caimakan, under advice from Belzoni's French rival Bernardino Drovetti, denies Belzoni's permit and initially refuses to supply labour until threats bring him around. Ramesses marriage to his true love Nefertari was fruitful and secured the family line and the country too was fertile thanks to the annual flooding of the Nile. The approaching flood season however threatens to strand the head in the heart of the flood plain bringing an abrupt halt to Belzoni's mission. When the local labourers finally arrive Belzoni immediately sets to work moving the head using the same techniques its builders had used 3,000 years previous. Belzoni sends the ailing Jim back to Cairo to request a bigger boat so that they can collect even more antiquities and with time running out is forced to take greater risks to get the head to the bank of the Nile.

With the head secured the Belzonis heads south along the Nile to Abu Simbal in uncharted Nubia to expand the collection of antiquities. Ramesses built two temples at Abu Simbal; one dedicated his beloved wife and the other to his military prowess in the first victorious campaign. Belzoni locates the entrance to the Great Temple but finds it blocked, and so forced to head back to Cairo he vows to return to excavate the site the following season.

==== Episode four: The Temple of the Sands ====
Belzoni, arriving back in Cairo, is informed by Salt that only the head is to be sent to the British Museum while the rest of the antiquities he has collected are to be kept at the consulate. Salt refuses to fund an excavation at Abu Simbal and Belzoni is sent south again with Salt's secretary William Beechey and a local dealer called Yanni. Belzoni, whilst becalmed at Minya. spots Yenni talking to his French rival Drovetti and hastily rides to Luxor determined to get there first. Arriving to late Belzoni discovers that the entire area licensed to Drovetti and he must dig elsewhere.

Belzoni, guided by the image of Ramesses, digs in an unlicensed area and discovers a perfectly preserved bust. An infuriated Drovetti has the local ruler issue an edict against Belzoni. With no other option Belzoni heads south to the Island of Philae to collect the antiquities he has stored there only to discover upon arrival that the French have ransacked them. Funds arrive from Salt to begin excavation at Abu Simbal and Belzoni heads to the site with two British Royal Navy officers. Work progresses slowly in the shifting desert until Belzoni devises a plan to build a palisade to hold back the sand. With the entrance uncovered the group cautiously enter to view the magnificent interior. Belzoni records every detail of the temple decorations, which celebrate the capture of Kadesh that made Ramesses a great warrior king. Back in Luxor Belzoni, reunited with Sarah and Jim, is threatened by Drevetti but undeterred he heads deep into the western hills where he enters the Valley of the Kings. Belzoni learns from Yanni and Beechey that Salt is selling off the antiquities he collects rather than donating them to the British Museum.

Persuaded to go on with his explorations Belzoni constructs a battering ram to break through the thick walls of the valley side and open up an undiscovered tomb. Defying booby-traps Belzoni pushes on into the lavish interior of the tomb where he enters the burial chamber of the Pharaoh Seti I. It was here upon the death of his father that Ramesses started his reign, which would bring peace and prosperity to Egypt. The discovery of Belzoni's Tomb secures the Egyptologist's reputation and makes him a celebrity in his adopted home of London where the British Museum would later honour him.

==== Cast ====
- Matthew Kelly as Belzoni
- Lynsey Baxter as Sarah Belzoni
- Nevan Finnigan as James Curtin
- Robert Portal as Henry Salt
- Richard Dempsey as William Beechey
- Thomas Lockyer as John Lewis Bukhardt
- Joseph Long as Bernardino Drovetti

=== Part three: Champollion ===
Jean-François Champollion uses the Rosetta Stone to unlock the mysteries of the lost civilisation of Ancient Egypt which had been closed off to Europeans for centuries prior to the invasion of Napoleon Bonaparte in 1798. The stone, discovered by the French in 1799, had been created as a work of propaganda by the Greek-speaking Pharaoh Ptolemy V to establish his place in Egyptian cosmology and flashbacks are included to explain this belief system.

==== Episode five: The Mystery of the Rosetta Stone ====
The young Champollion, encouraged to develop his gift for languages by his elder brother, becomes obsessed with deciphering hieroglyphs as a means to telling the age of the world and revenging France against the British who had confiscated the stone in 1801. When Alexander the Great had conquered Egypt, he had fuelled local resentment by bringing in a Greek speaking elite to rule. Their descendant King Tutankhamun had commissioned a series of stones written in Greek, common Egyptian and hieroglyphs for temples across the land to extol his virtues and underline his claim to the throne.

Champollion studies under Silvestre de Sacy in Paris but finds the professor who had himself failed decipher hieroglyphs dismissive of further attempts believing them to be symbolic rather than a true language. English scientist Thomas Young uses mathematics to decipher the inscription like a code whilst Champollion believing hieroglyphs to be representative of a spoken language attempts to relate them to the Coptic language of Egypt's ancient Christian communities. Young makes a number of breakthroughs including the spelling of Ptolemy in hieroglyphs while Champollion finds work as assistant professor at the University of Grenoble. France is thrown into political turmoil in 1815 following defeat at the Battle of Waterloo and the republican Champollion is arrested for sedition and exiled to Figeac until 1821. Eccentric Egyptologist Giovanni Belzoni discovers an obelisk inscribed with the name of Cleopatra in Greek and hieroglyphs at Philae and sends it back to Young in England.

Young makes a mistake in translating the obelisk setting back his work whilst Champollion using a copy of the obelisk creates a hieroglyphic alphabet that he uses along with Coptic to translate the name of Ramesses the Great from sketches of Abu Simbal. Champollion's discovery arouses the suspicions of the Catholic Church who fear hieroglyphs might disprove the historical accuracy of the Bible. Young wishes Champllion good luck in proving his theories but Sacy and the Church are determined to stop him.

==== Episode six: The Secrets of the Hieroglyphs ====
Champollion is determined to travel to Egypt to prove his theory but poor and jobless he is reduced to buying up whatever scraps of papyrus he can find and this obsession alienates his wife. The Dendera zodiac purchased by the French King Charles X threatens to challenge the biblical chronologies of church scholars, as it is believed by some to date to before the Great Flood of 2349 BC. Champollion is called in to confirm Sacy's dating of the antiquity to around 2000 BC; he disputes Sacy's dating but not Church authorities by dating it to some 2,000 years later than that during the Roman period.

Champollion is sent to Turin by the King to value a collection put up for sale by the French Consul to Egypt Bernardino Drovetti. Prior to his departure Champollion's wife announces that she is pregnant and she is not pleased by his new job. Champollion builds a strong reputation for himself in Italy even being invited for an audience with Pope Leo XII. Returning to Paris with a large collection of antiquities for the King he is put in charge of the Egyptian collection at the Louvre. The King finally agrees to fund Champollion's expedition to Egypt on the proviso that he does not publish any finds that contradict the teachings of the Church. Champollion, arriving in 1828, starts by studying the Great Pyramid at Giza discovering it to be a tomb built for the Pharaoh Khufu around 2560 BC. At Saqqara he finds the site largely stripped by dealers but in a forgotten tomb he discovers ancient hieroglyphs he translates to prove his theories. Eager to understand the Ancient Egyptians he pushes on to the ancient capital of Thebes where at the sprawling Temple of Karnak he reads the story of Ramesses the Great and the battle against the Hittites at Kadesh.

At Belzoni's Tomb in the Valley of the Kings the ailing Champollion reads the story of Pharaoh Seti I and learns of the burial rites of Pharaohs. He is thus able to comprehend the belief system of the Ancient Egyptians for the first time. Champollion dies back in France 18 months later but his legacy allows Egyptologist to comprehend the meaning behind monuments such as the Great Pyramid of Giza and to decipher papyri that lead to such discoveries as the Tomb of Tutankhamun by Howard Carter.

==== Cast ====
- Elliot Cowan as Jean-François Champollion
- Stuart Bunce as Jacques-Joseph Champollion

== Media information ==
=== DVD release ===
Released on Region 2 DVD by BBC Video on 2006-02-06.

Also released on Region 1 DVD (2 discs, but does not include the bonus 'Pyramid') by BBC Worldwide 2006-05-23

=== Companion book ===
The 2005 companion book to the series was written by author and archaeologist Joyce Tyldesley expands on the series to tell the full story of the discoveries and the colourful characters who made them.

==== Selected editions ====
- Tyldesley, Joyce (6 October 2005). Egypt, How A Lost Civilization Was Rediscovered. BBC Books (hardcover). ISBN 978-0-563-52257-7.
- Tyldesley, Joyce (1 June 2003). Egypt, How A Lost Civilization Was Rediscovered. BBC Books (paperback). ISBN 978-0-563-49381-5.
- Tyldesley, Joyce (18 September 2005). Egypt, How A Lost Civilization Was Rediscovered. UC Press (hardcover). ISBN 978-0-520-25020-8.

== See also ==
- Building the Great Pyramid
