= Egyptian Journeys with Dan Cruickshank =

- Genre: Documentary
- Presented by: Dan Cruickshank
- Country of origin: United Kingdom
- Original language: English
- No. of seasons: 1
- No. of episodes: 6

Production
- Producers: Martin Mortimore; Naomi Austin; Tanya Batchelor
- Running time: 30 minutes

Original release
- Network: BBC Two
- Release: 30 October – 4 December 2005

Related
- Egypt

Egyptian Journeys with Dan Cruickshank is a BBC Television documentary series in which Dan Cruickshank explores the mysteries of Ancient Egypt.

== Production ==
The series was commissioned to accompany the docudrama series Egypt which ran concurrently on BBC One.

== Reception ==
Sam Wollaston writing in The Guardian complimented the series as "a more scholarly appendage to the BBC1 show," stating that "Cruickshank was charming, breathless and enthusiastic, whispering every sentence to the camera as if he's telling you, and only you, an amazing secret," before going on to comment that his favourite scene involved a donkey, "as favourite scenes often do." David Chater writing in The Times complimented Cruickshank's "inimitable style".

David Liddiment writing in The Guardian compliments the clever twinning of this more cerebral series with the docudrama on BBC One but he points out that this was done during the final stages of the BBC's charter renewal review and insists that the corporation should keep up standards after this process is completed.

=== Ratings ===
- Episode one (2005-10-30): 2.3 million viewers (11% audience share).
- Episode three (2005-11-13): 2.2 million viewers (10% audience share).

== Episodes ==
=== "'The Secrets of the Tomb Builders" ===
Cruickshank finds out about the mysterious people who built the spectacular underground tombs of the Pharaohs.

Cruickshank flies over the Valley of the Kings where the pharaohs hid their tombs over 3,500 years ago. Over 60 tombs are dug into the walls of the valley where the bodies and riches inside could be guarded from tomb robbers. Descending into the massive KV5, built by Rameses II for his sons, Cruickshank is able to admire the precise engineering skills of its builders. In the Tomb of Horemheb, sealed before it could be completed, he admires the unfinished work of the tomb artists. At Deir el-Medina he sees where the generations of builder, painters, sculptors and engineers who built the tombs lived with their families kept separate from the rest of the world.

From the wealth of archaeological evidence (scraps of cloth, fragments of wood, traces of paint) archaeologist have built up a detailed picture of the tomb builders' lives. Cruickshank ponders the life of an ancient family of tomb builders at the house of Senagem. The builders were highly literate and thousands of examples of their writing on limestone and pottery have been uncovered giving detailed and intimate insights into ancient Egyptian life. From these ostraca we can see that they were not slaves but well cared for state employees who held some of the most important secrets of the state but court documents reveal these were also the tomb robbers.

Cruickshank explains how this journey has changed his view of the valley from a place of death, afterlife, ritual and religion into a place of ordinary people and their daily lives. This insight into life in this land thousands of years ago is history from the bottom up a long way from the propaganda left behind by the pharaohs.

=== "The Pharaoh Hunter" ===
Cruickshank follows in the footsteps of Howard Carter to trace the life of the man who discovered the Tomb of Tutankhamun.

Cruickshank attributes the discovery of the treasure of Tutankahmun to the sheer tenacity of Carter. Carter's solitary upbringing by maiden aunts in rural Norfolk is credited as the source of his self-reliance and sense of being an outsider. Carter left school aged 15 with little formal education but great artistic skills. Lord and Lady Amherst's Egyptian collection at nearby Diddlington Hall entranced Carter and they appointed him to a dig in Egypt. Arriving at the vibrantly decorated tombs at Beni Hasan he became disenchanted with the arid tracings he was instructed to produce and instead created beautiful watercolour renditions. Later he joined the dig at El Amarna and learned the scientific style of its leader Flinders Petrie.

At 19, Carter was appointed site artist at the Temple of Queen Hatshepsut in Deir el-Bahri winning great acclaim with his newly acquired archaeological skill and was running the dig within 6 years. His subsequent appointment as Chief Inspector in Egyptian Antiquities Service arose resentment amongst more experienced archaeologists and was soon forced to resign. The outcast Carter eventually teamed up with Lord Carnarvon and the two began the search for Tutankhamun which eventually succeeded thanks to Carter's stubbornness. The project took over the life of the meticulous Carter who fell-out with Carnarvon over the disposition of the find further isolating him.

Carter spent over a decade completing the excavation of the site before being gently pushed aside by the authorities and returning to a solitary existence in England where later he died leaving behind a magnificent archaeological legacy.

=== "The Rebel Pharaoh" ===
Cruickshank goes on the trail of Egypt's most controversial ruler and his beautiful wife Nefertiti.

The Pharaoh Akhenaten is described as a revolutionary whose dangerous ideas would change politics, religion, art and language leading the nation to the brink of catastrophe. Preserved statues of Akhnaten do not conform to the traditional depictions of a pharaoh highlighting his unconventional style. Early in his reign he underwent a religious conversion and proposed replacing the pantheon of gods with a single sun god. Wall paintings from the tomb of Chief Vizier Ramosa illustrate this overthrow.

Akhnaten left the ancient capital of Luxor to build a religious utopia in the desert to break from the past and honour his new monotheistic god. The great temple at Amarna opened up to the sun but only the Pharaoh and his family were allowed in. Akhnaton came to believe that he was the son of god and should be worshipped as such. He initiated a persecution of believers in the old gods and Egypt lost status as the Pharaoh became disassociated from the real world. Art works preserved at the site show unprecedented images of the royal family displaying humanistic emotions of affection and grief.

A plague sweeps the land, taking Akhnaten's wife and children, and the Pharaoh is held responsible as social order begins to fall apart. Akhnaten's death, possibly at the hands of his own courtiers, leads to his successor Tutankhamun abandoning Amarna and restoring the old gods. All trace of Akhnaten was buried, ironically preserving it for modern archaeologist.

=== "Building for Eternity" ===
Cruickshank explores how and why the ancient Egyptians made things to last forever, fuelled by their belief in eternity.

Egyptian belief in an afterlife led to the development of ingenious techniques that have preserved much of their culture to this day. At Saqqara the Pharaoh Zoza built upon the traditional stone monument to create Egypt's first step pyramid as part of a stone complex designed to last forever. Zoza continually expanded his pyramid confirming the importance of size that culminated with the Great Pyramid of Khufu at Giza. Later monuments use granite ferried down the Nile from distant Aswan to achieve the same level of eternity.

The Nile was the fertile centre of the Egyptian world and its seasonal cycle inspired the very idea of eternity. They developed mummification to maintain the body for this continuing renewal. Following preservation the heart was reinserted as the seat of the soul and rituals were conducted to reawaken the senses of the deceased. Ancient Egyptians also believed such rituals necessary for the annual flooding of the Nile and the rising of the sun and great temples such as the one at Dendera were built to facilitate this.

The temples were the engines of eternity built on massive scale to last forever as a route from the world of man to that of the gods with only the most privileged allowed access. The longevity of the Egyptian civilisation allowed some to question the very nature of eternity as they witnessed the desolation of ancient monuments but much has survived allowing the ancients to live on.

=== "Pharaoh's Wives" ===
Cruickshank goes on the trail of a pharaoh's wife who committed a crime so terrible they tried to wipe her name from history.

The last of the great pharaohs Ramesses III died in mysterious circumstances surrounded by enemies and civil disobedience. In the first year of his reign he ordered the construction of Medinet Habu filled with great depictions of his huge wealth and military victories and unprecedented depictions of his prowess with women. Ancient papyri bought on Cairo's black market in the 19th century however tell of an indecisive man unable even to choose between Tiye and Isis as his great queen.

Tiye and Isis compete to have their son named as heir of Ramesses III and the Pharaoh eventually chooses Isis. Tiye plots to murder the Pharaoh and seize the country in a military coup. Tiye uses spells stolen from the Pharaoh's own library against him and recruits many important generals and courtiers into her conspiracy (including the food-taster). Ramesses's failing health and poor political decisions lead to civil disobedience and revolt across the country. Ti seizes the opportunity and within the month Ramesses III is dead presumably from poisoning.

The subsequent coup however fails and Isis's son Pharaoh Ramesses IV round up the conspirators and puts them on trial. The harem women's final plot to seduce the judges is discovered and all the conspirators are executed. Isis and her son Pentawere are chiselled from history and only the papyri survive to tell their story.

=== "The Death of Ancient Egypt" ===
Cruickshank travels the length of the country to find out what brought this remarkable civilisation to an abrupt and tragic end.

The arrival of Alexander the Great in 332 BC ushered in the 300 years rule of the Ptolemaic dynasty where Greek culture would challenge the old beliefs. The Greeks however were seduced by the mystery and magic of Ancient Egyptian and erected statues to the old god in their temples. Cleopatra, despite her Greek blood, became the archetypal Egyptian with even her legendary death at the bite of a sacred asp designed to usher her into the eternal pantheon of Egyptian deities.

The Romans marched into Egypt in 30 BC intent on turning it into an imperial province and bled the country dry to sustain the Empires extensive territories. The vast resources of Egypt supplied one third of Romes grain as well as gold and granite. The country was bankrupted, the temples neglected and the priests disregarded but the beliefs lived on to seduce the Roman oppressors with some even being mummified.

Christianity was adopted as the official religion of the Roman Empire and enforced upon the Egyptians. Greeks and Romans could blend their own pantheons with those of Egypt but Christianity was monotheistic and intolerant regarding old gods as devils. Ancient rituals were appropriated and transformed, including the Ptolomeic idea of monasticism, finally defeating the old gods by the mid-4th century when over half the Egyptian population had converted to Christianity and the rest were persecuted.

The last of believers in the old faith retreated to the Island of Philae, where the last Demotic hieroglyphs were carved in 394 AD, and when this bastion finally fell a 3000-year-old culture had been wiped out and its knowledge forgotten.
