= Curse of the pharaohs =

Alleged curse on people who disturb the mummy of a pharaoh

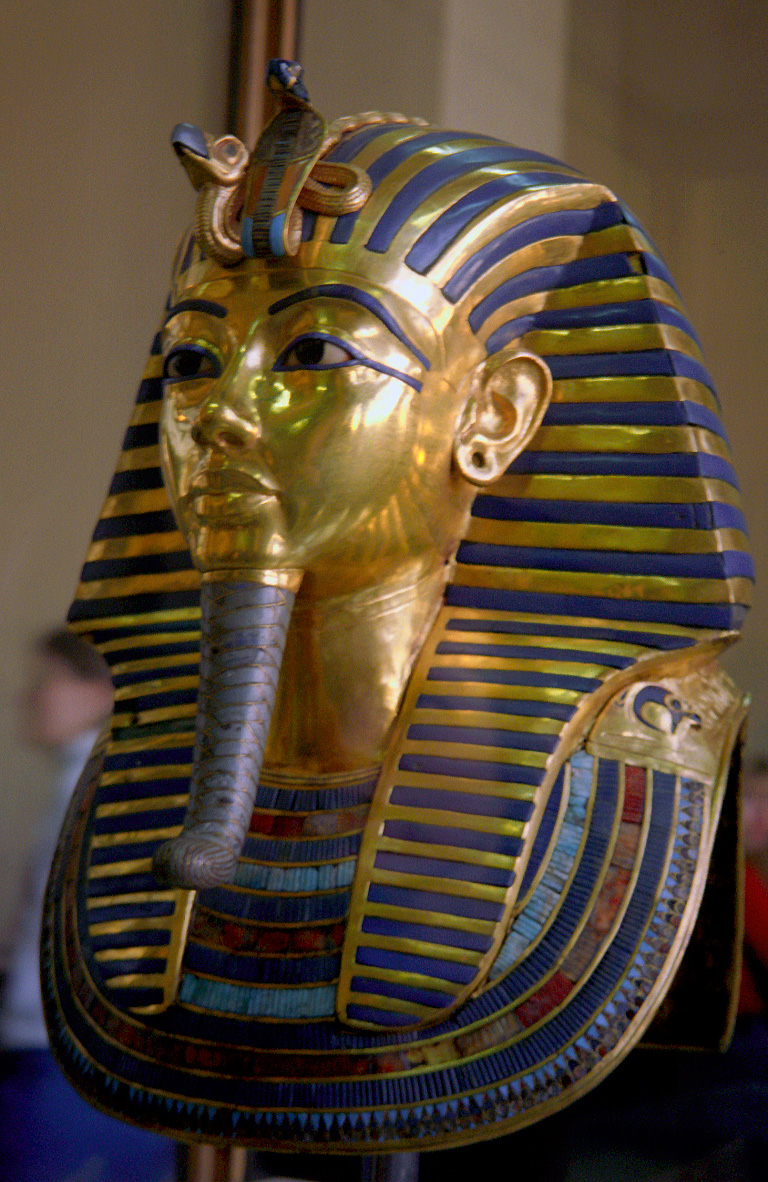
The Royal Cobra (Uraeus), representing the protector goddess Wadjet, atop the mask of Tutankhamun

The curse of the pharaohs or the mummy's curse or the Curse of King Tut is a curse alleged to be cast upon anyone who disturbs the mummy of an ancient Egyptian, especially a pharaoh. This curse, which does not differentiate between thieves and archaeologists, is claimed to cause bad luck, illness, or death. Since the mid-20th century, many authors and documentaries have argued that the curse is 'real' in the sense of having scientifically explicable causes such as bacteria, fungi or radiation. However, the modern origins of Egyptian mummy curse tales, their development primarily in European cultures, the shift from magic to science to explain curses, and their changing uses—from condemning disturbance of the dead to entertaining horror film audiences—suggest that Egyptian curses are primarily a cultural, not scientific, phenomenon.

There are occasional instances of genuine ancient curses appearing inside or on the façade of a tomb, as in the case of the mastaba of Khentika Ikhekhi of the 6th Dynasty at Saqqara. These appear to be directed towards the ka priests to protect the tomb carefully and preserve its ritual purity rather than as a warning for potential robbers. There had been stories of curses going back to the 19th century, but they multiplied after Howard Carter's discovery of the tomb of Tutankhamun. Despite popular misconceptions, no curse was found inscribed in the Pharaoh's tomb. The evidence for curses relating to Tutankhamun is considered to be so meager that Donald B. Redford called it "unadulterated claptrap".

== Tomb curses ==
Curses relating to tombs are extremely rare, possibly because the idea of such desecration was unthinkable and even dangerous to record. They most frequently occur in private tombs of the Old Kingdom era. The tomb of Ankhtifi (9–10th dynasty) contains the warning: "any ruler who... shall do evil or wickedness to this coffin... may Hemen (a local deity) not accept any goods he offers, and may his heir not inherit". The tomb of Khentika Ikhekhi (6th dynasty) contains an inscription: "As for all men who shall enter this my tomb... impure... there will be judgment... an end shall be made for him... I shall seize his neck like a bird... I shall cast the fear of myself into him".

The only known pharaonic curse found from the Old Kingdom was in the Pyramid of Pepi I where one of the passages of the Pyramid Texts gives the warning to anyone who disturbs the tomb: "He who shall give his finger against this pyramid and this god's enclosure of Pepi and of his ka, he has given his finger against Horus’s Enclosure in the Cool Waters. Nephthys shall traverse for him every place of his [father] Geb. His case has been heard by the Ennead and he has nothing, he has no house. He is one accursed, he is one who eats his own body."

Curses after the Old Kingdom era are less common though more severe, sometimes invoking the ire of Thoth or the destruction of Sekhemet. Zahi Hawass quotes an example of a post-Old Kingdom curse: "Cursed be those who disturb the rest of a Pharaoh. They that shall break the seal of this tomb shall meet death by a disease that no doctor can diagnose."

== Modern accounts ==
Hieroglyphs were not deciphered until the early 19th century, so reports of curses before this are simply perceived bad luck associated with the handling of mummies and other artefacts from tombs. In 1699, Louis Penicher wrote an account in which he recorded how a Polish traveller bought two mummies in Alexandria and embarked on a sea journey with the mummies in the cargo hold. The traveller was alarmed by recurring visions of two spectres, and the stormy seas did not abate until the mummies were thrown overboard.

Zahi Hawass recalled that, as a young archaeologist excavating at Kom Abu Billo, he had to transport several artefacts from the Greco-Roman site. He states that his cousin died on that day, that his uncle died on its first anniversary, and that on the third anniversary, his aunt died. Years later, when he excavated the tombs of the builders of the pyramids at Giza, he encountered the curse: "All people who enter this tomb who will make evil against this tomb and destroy it may the crocodile be against them in water, and snakes against them on land. May the hippopotamus be against them in water, the scorpion on land." Though claiming not to be superstitious, Hawass decided not to disturb the mummies. However, he also claims he was later involved in the removal of two child mummies from Bahariya Oasis to a museum and reported that he was haunted by the children in his dreams – a phenomenon which he claims did not stop until the mummy of the father was reunited with the children in the museum.

The idea of a mummy reviving from the dead, an essential element of many mummy curse tales, was developed in The Mummy!: Or a Tale of the Twenty-Second Century, an early work combining science fiction and horror, written by Jane C. Loudon and published anonymously in 1827. Louisa May Alcott was thought by Dominic Montserrat to have been the first to use a fully formed "mummy curse" plot in her 1869 story Lost in a Pyramid, or The Mummy's Curse, a hitherto forgotten piece of mummy fiction that he rediscovered in the late 1990s. However, two stories subsequently discovered by S. J. Wolfe, Robert Singerman and Jasmine Day – The Mummy’s Soul (Anonymous, 1862) and After Three Thousand Years (Jane G. Austin, 1868) – have similar plots, in which a female mummy takes magical revenge upon her male desecrator. Jasmine Day, therefore, argues that the modern European concept of curses is based upon an analogy between desecration of tombs and rape, interpreting early curse fiction as proto-feminist narratives authored by women. The Anonymous and Austin stories predate Alcott's piece, raising the possibility that even earlier "lost" mummy curse prototype fiction awaits rediscovery.

== Opening of Tutankhamun's tomb ==
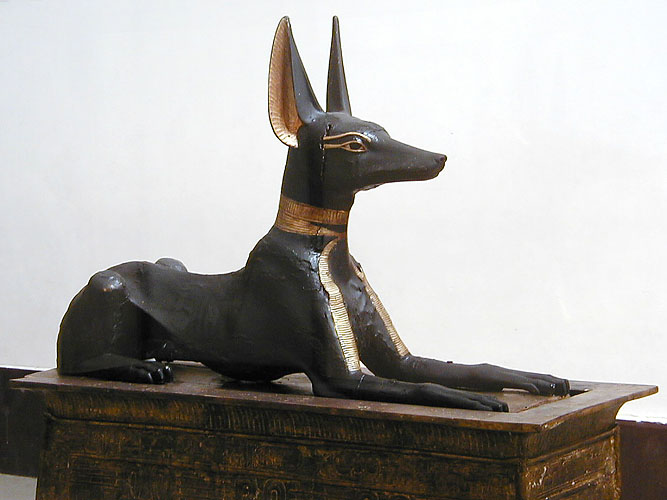
The statue of Anubis figure which guarded the entrance to Tutankhamun's treasury room

The belief in a curse was brought to many people's attention due to the deaths of a few members of Howard Carter's team and other prominent visitors to the tomb shortly thereafter. Carter's team opened the tomb of Tutankhamun (KV62) in 1922, launching the modern era of Egyptology.

The famous Egyptologist James Henry Breasted worked with Carter soon after the first opening of the tomb. He reported how Carter sent a messenger on an errand to his house. On approaching his home the messenger thought he heard a "faint, almost human cry". Upon reaching the entrance he saw the birdcage occupied by a cobra, the symbol of the Egyptian monarchy. Carter's canary had died in its mouth and this fuelled local rumours of a curse. Arthur Weigall, a previous Inspector-General of Antiquities to the Egyptian Government, reported that this was interpreted as Carter's house being broken into by the Royal Cobra, the same as that worn on the King's head to strike enemies (see Uraeus), on the very day the King's tomb was being broken into. An account of the incident was reported by The New York Times on 22 December 1922.

The first of the deaths was that of Lord Carnarvon, who financed the excavation. He had been bitten by a mosquito, and later slashed the bite accidentally while shaving. It became infected and that resulted in blood poisoning. Two weeks before Carnarvon died, Marie Corelli wrote an imaginative letter that was published in the New York World magazine, in which she quoted an obscure book that confidently asserted that "dire punishment" would follow any intrusion into a sealed tomb. A media frenzy followed, with reports that a curse had been found in the King's tomb, though this was untrue. The superstitious Benito Mussolini, who had once accepted an Egyptian mummy as a gift, ordered its immediate removal from the Palazzo Chigi.

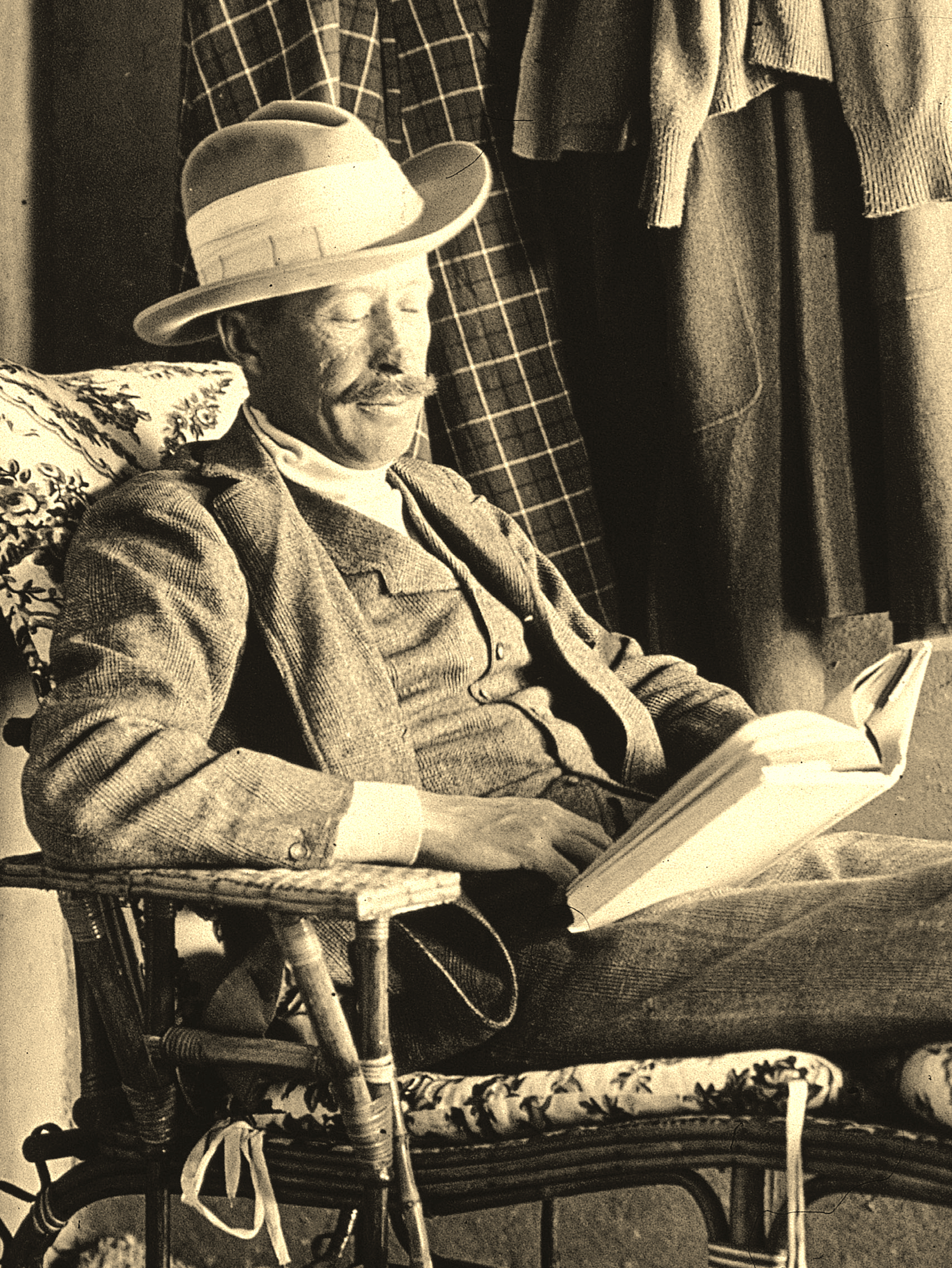
The death of Lord Carnarvon six weeks after the opening of Tutankhamun's tomb resulted in many curse stories in the press.

Sir Arthur Conan Doyle, creator of Sherlock Holmes and spiritualist, suggested that Lord Carnarvon's death had been caused by "elementals" created by Tutankhamun's priests to guard the royal tomb, and this further fuelled the media interest. Arthur Weigall reported that six weeks before Carnarvon's death, he had watched the Earl laughing and joking as he entered the King's tomb and said to a nearby reporter (H. V. Morton), "I give him six weeks to live." The first autopsy carried out on the body of Tutankhamun by Dr. Derry found a healed lesion on the left cheek, but as Carnarvon had been buried six months previously it was not possible to determine if the location of the wound on the King corresponded with the fatal mosquito bite on Carnarvon.

A study of documents and scholarly sources led The Lancet to conclude it unlikely that Carnarvon's death had anything to do with Tutankhamun's tomb, refuting another theory that exposure to toxic fungi (mycotoxins) had contributed to his demise. The report points out that the Earl was only one of many to enter the tomb, on several occasions and that none of the others were affected. The cause of Carnarvon's death was reported as "'pneumonia supervening on [facial] erysipelas,' (a streptococcal infection of the skin and underlying soft tissue). Pneumonia was thought to be only one of various complications, arising from the progressively invasive infection, that eventually resulted in multiorgan failure." The Earl had been "prone to frequent and severe lung infections" according to The Lancet and there had been a "general belief ... that one acute attack of bronchitis could have killed him. In such a debilitated state, the Earl's immune system was easily overwhelmed by erysipelas."

In 1925, the anthropologist Henry Field, accompanied by Breasted, visited the tomb and recalled the kindness and friendliness of Carter. He also reported how a paperweight given to Carter's friend Sir Bruce Ingram was composed of a mummified hand with its wrist adorned with a scarab bracelet marked with, "Cursed be he who moves my body. To him shall come fire, water, and pestilence." Soon after receiving the gift, Ingram's house burned down, followed by a flood when it was rebuilt.

Howard Carter was entirely sceptical of such curses, dismissing them as 'tommy-rot' and commenting that "the sentiment of the Egyptologist ... is not one of fear, but of respect and awe ... entirely opposed to foolish superstitions". He was backed in his opinion by Herbert Eustis Winlock, who was closely involved in that excavation and, as a friend of Carter's, and consistently dismissed the claims that a curse attached itself to those who visited the tomb or who were involved in the work on it. In May 1926, Carter reported in his diary a sighting of a jackal of the same type as Anubis, the guardian of the dead, for the first time in over thirty-five years of working in the desert, although he did not attribute this to supernatural causes.

Skeptics have pointed out that many others who visited the tomb or helped to discover it lived long and healthy lives. A study showed that of the 58 people who were present when the tomb and sarcophagus were opened, only eight died within a dozen years. All the others were still alive, including Howard Carter, who died of lymphoma in 1939 at the age of 64. The last survivors included Lady Evelyn Herbert, Lord Carnarvon's daughter, who was among the first people to enter the tomb after its discovery in November 1922, who lived for a further 57 years and died in 1980, and American archaeologist J.O. Kinnaman, who died in 1961, 39 years after the event.

=== Scientific speculations ===
It has been suggested that the toxic spores of the fungus Aspergillus flavus, besides possibly contributing to deaths following a 1973 tomb opening in Poland, may also have contributed to some of the allegedly Tutankhamun-related deaths, particularly the deaths of Lord Carnarvon, George Jay Gould, and Arthur Mace, though the link has been disputed (at least in Carnarvon's case).

=== Deaths popularly attributed to Tutankhamun's curse ===
The tomb was opened on 29 November 1922.

- George Herbert, 5th Earl of Carnarvon, financial backer of the excavation, who was present at the tomb's opening, died on 5 April 1923 after a mosquito bite became infected; he died 4 months and 7 days after the opening of the tomb.
- George Jay Gould I, a visitor to the tomb, died in the French Riviera on 16 May 1923 after he developed a fever following his visit.
- Sir Archibald Douglas-Reid, a radiologist invited to x-ray Tutankhamun's mummy, died on 15 January 1924, aged 52, in Switzerland after abdominal surgery to help treat the metastatic spread of skin cancer he developed as a result of his career.
- A. C. Mace, a member of Carter's excavation team, died in April 1928, having suffered from pleurisy and pneumonia in his final years.
- The Hon. Mervyn Herbert, George Herbert's half brother, died on 26 May 1929, reportedly from malarial pneumonia.
- Captain The Hon. Richard Bethell, Carter's secretary, died on 15 November 1929: died in bed in a Mayfair club, the victim of a suspected smothering.
- Arthur Callender, the archaeological assistant to Howard Carter during the excavation of Tutankhamun's tomb from 1922 to 1932, died well over nine years later on 12 December 1936; however, some have still attributed his death to the curse.
- Howard Carter opened the tomb on 16 February 1923 and died well over sixteen years later on 2 March 1939; however, some have still attributed his death to the curse.
- Harry Burton, the archaeological photographer documenting Howard Carter's excavation of Tutankhamun's tomb from 1922 to 1932, died well over seventeen years later on 27 June 1940; however, some have still attributed his death to the curse.

== Popular culture ==
The Universal horror films The Mummy (1932), The Mummy's Hand (1940), and the latter's sequels, contain references to a curse foretelling death to those who enter the tombs.

- Pharaoh's Curse (1957 film)
- The Curse of the Mummy's Tomb (1964 film)
- The Curse of King Tut's Tomb (1980 film)

== See also ==
- Curse of Timur
