= 1969 Walthamstow East by-election =

UK Parliamentary by-election

The 1969 Walthamstow East by-election of 27 March 1969 was held following the death of Labour Member of Parliament (MP) William Robinson. The seat was won by the opposition Conservative Party.

== Background ==
The Conservatives had gained the seat from Labour in 1955 and held it at the next two elections. In 1964 the Conservative majority had fallen to just 395 votes over Labour, whose candidate was William Robinson, a solicitor who had been a member of Leyton Borough Council between 1945 and 1952 and then had been elected to Wanstead and Woodford Borough Council, serving as Mayor of the latter in 1962–63. In 1966 Robinson had stood again and had taken the seat for Labour with a majority of 1,807 votes.

== Result ==
Walthamstow East by-election, 1969
Party	Candidate	Votes	%	±%
Conservative	Michael McNair-Wilson	13,158	63.15	+20.82
Labour	Colin Phipps	7,679	36.85	−10.98
Majority		5,479	26.30	N/A
Turnout		20,837		
Conservative gain from Labour		Swing	+15.9	

== Previous result ==
General election 1966: Walthamstow East
Party	Candidate	Votes	%	±%
Labour	William Robinson	15,703	47.83	+6.1
Conservative	John Harvey	13,896	42.33	−0.6
Liberal	John Peter James Ellis	3,229	9.84	−5.5
Majority		1,807	5.50	N/A
Turnout		32,828	80.11	+0.8
Labour gain from Conservative		Swing	+3.4	

== Aftermath ==
This defeat marked the twelfth time that Labour had failed to successfully defend a seat it held at a by-election since the last general election. The gain at Walthamstow was one of three Conservative wins in by-elections held that day, with the Party also retaining Brighton Pavilion and holding Weston-super-Mare from Labour. Across the three contests there was an average swing of 16% from Labour to Conservative, which Conservative Shadow Home Secretary Quintin Hogg noted would give his party a comfortable majority in the House of Commons if repeated at the next general election. Anthony Barber, the Chairman of the Conservative Party, noted that his party had now won 10 seats from Labour since the last general election and called on the Labour Government to "throw in the towel." The next day's Glasgow Herald reported that the "dispiriting performance" by Labour in the three by-elections, the first contests of 1969, raised questions as to when the tide would turn for the party and noted that "some Labour MPs feel in their bones" that the party could not recover to win the general election which would come within the next two years. However the same article noted that the much reduced turnout in Walthamstow East (and in the Brighton contest) had distorted the results and could be argued by Labour as evidence that its supporters had stayed at home and were reserving their judgement on the Government.

At the 1970 election McNair-Wilson would narrowly hold the seat.
