= Evelyn Herbert, Countess of Carnarvon =

Evelyn Herbert, Countess of Carnarvon may refer to:

- First wife of Henry Herbert, 4th Earl of Carnarvon
- Lady Evelyn Herbert (1901–1980), daughter of George Herbert, 5th Earl of Carnarvon
