= Foster v Driscoll =

English contract law case concerning illegality under foreign laws

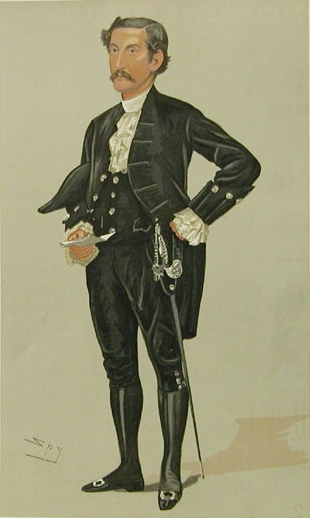
- Sir Harry Foster
- Court: Court of Appeal
- Citation: [1929] 1 KB 470
- Transcript: Transcript

Case opinions
- Lawrence LJ

Keywords
- contract, illegality

Foster v Driscoll [1929] 1 KB 470 is a decision of the Court of Appeal of England and Wales in relation to illegality under foreign laws and its effect under English contract law.

== Facts ==
Sir Harry Foster, a British politician, entered into contracts with various parties (including a distiller and a ship broker) to finance an undertaking for the supply of 500 cases of whisky into the United States in breach of prohibition laws. In pursuance of the undertaking bills of exchange were presented for payment but dishonoured. Foster then sought rescission of the contract. Three actions were consolidated and eventually came before the Court of Appeal.

== Decision ==
The judge at first instance, Wright J, held that the purpose of the enterprise was to smuggle whisky into the United States for profit. Although this was not illegal in England, it was clearly in breach of US laws, and thus he declined to enforce the contracts

In the Court of Appeal Lawrence LJ held "I am clearly of opinion that a partnership formed for the main purpose of deriving profit from the commission of a criminal offence in a foreign and friendly country is illegal". Accordingly the court dismissed all of the claims and counterclaims, without any order as to costs.

== Authority ==
The case is still cited as good authority for the proposition that a contract to break the laws of a friendly foreign jurisdiction will be unenforceable for illegality even if the contract is otherwise lawful under English law.
