= The Curse of King Tut's Tomb (1980 film) =

- Genre: Horror
- Based on: Behind the Mask of Tutankhamen by Barry Wynne
- Written by: Herb Meadow
- Directed by: Philip Leacock
- Starring: Eva Marie Saint; Harry Andrews
- Music by: Gil Mellé
- Countries of origin: United Kingdom; United States
- Original language: English

Production
- Executive producers: Stoddard W. Kerby; Hunt Stromberg Jr.
- Producer: Peter Graham Scott
- Production locations: Egypt; England
- Cinematography: Bob Edwards
- Editor: Adrian Brenard
- Running time: 98 minutes
- Production companies: Columbia Pictures Television; Stromberg-Kerby Productions

Original release
- Network: NBC
- Release: 8 May – 9 May 1980
- Release: 31 August 1980 (UK)

The Curse of King Tut's Tomb is a 1980 horror film directed by Philip Leacock and starring Eva Marie Saint, Harry Andrews, Raymond Burr and Tom Baker, with Paul Scofield as the narrator.

== Plot ==
The English archaeologist Howard Carter and his financier, Lord Carnarvon discover the tomb of Tut-Ench-Amun after years of search. Unscrupulous art collector Sebastian is after the legendary sarcophagus from within the tomb. Rumors abound of a curse that befalls anyone who disturbs the grave. The Curse of the Pharaoh seems to be effective, for there ensues a series of mysterious deaths.

== Cast ==
- Eva Marie Saint as Sarah Morrissey
- Robin Ellis as Howard Carter
- Raymond Burr as Jonash Sabastian
- Harry Andrews as Lord Carnarvon
- Wendy Hiller as Princess Vilma
- Angharad Rees as Lady Evelyn Herbert
- Tom Baker as Hasan
- Barbara Murray as Giovanna Antoniella
- Faith Brook as Lady Almina Carnarvon
- Patricia Routledge as "Posh" Lady
- John Palmer as Fishbait
- Darien Angadi as Ahmed Nahas
- Rupert Frazer as Collins
- Rex Holdsworth as Doctor
- Stefan Kalipha as Daoud
- Andy Pantelidou as Lieutenant
- Alfred Hoffman as Stallholder
- Paul Scofield as Narrator (voice)

== Production ==
The film was made-for-television by Columbia Pictures Television, with the story based on the book Behind the Mask of Tutankhamen by Barry Wynne. It is a fictionalised account of Howard Carter and Lord Carnarvon's excavation of Tutankhamun's tomb, with the real events embellished with various myths and legends. It was shot in Egypt and England.

Ian McShane was originally cast as Carter, but had to be replaced when he was involved in a car accident prior to filming and broke his leg.

== Soundtrack ==
The score was composed by American jazz musician Gil Mellé.

== Release ==
It was released in two parts and aired on 8 and 9 May 1980.

== DVD release ==
A Region 2 DVD was released in 2011 by Network.
