= William Robinson (Walthamstow East MP) =

British Labour Party politician

William Oscar James Robinson (20 March 1909 – 18 October 1968) was a British Labour Party politician who was the Member of Parliament for Walthamstow East from 1966 until his death.

== Background ==
Robinson was born in Islington on 20 March 1909, he was educated at the University of London and became a solicitor.

== Political career ==
Robinson was elected to Leyton Borough Council in 1945, serving until 1952, being elected to Wanstead and Woodford Borough Council in the same year. He also served as Mayor of Wanstead and Woodford in 1962–63. He made three early unsuccessful attempts for parliament, as the Labour candidate at Windsor in 1955 United Kingdom general election, Harwich in 1959, and Walthamstow East in 1964.

On his second attempt at Walthamstow East in 1966, Robinson was successful, winning the seat with a majority of 1,807 over the sitting Conservative Party MP John Harvey.

== Personal life and death ==
In 1949, Robinson married Florence Minnott. He died in his sleep at his Wanstead home on 18 October 1968, at the age of 59. The resulting by-election was held in March 1969 and won with a 5,479-vote majority by the Conservative Michael McNair-Wilson, whose brother Patrick had won a by-election in 1968.

Parliament of the United Kingdom
| Preceded by John Harvey | Member of Parliament for Walthamstow East; 1966 – 1968 | Succeeded by Michael McNair-Wilson |
