= Michael McNair-Wilson =

British politician (1930–1993)

Sir Michael McNair-Wilson

Member of Parliament for Newbury
- In office 28 February 1974 – 16 March 1992
- Preceded by: John Astor
- Succeeded by: Judith Chaplin

Member of Parliament for Walthamstow East
- In office 27 March 1969 – 7 February 1974
- Preceded by: William Robinson
- Succeeded by: Constituency abolished

Personal details
- Born: Robert Michael Conal McNair-Wilson; 12 October 1930 London, England
- Died: 28 March 1993 (aged 62) Bucklebury, Berkshire, England
- Party: Conservative
- Spouse: Deidre Granville (m. 1974)
- Children: Laura Farris
- Relatives: Patrick McNair-Wilson (brother)
- Education: Eton College

Sir Robert Michael Conal McNair-Wilson (12 October 1930 – 28 March 1993) was a British Conservative Party politician. He was the Member of Parliament (MP) for Walthamstow East from 1969 to 1974 and for Newbury from 1974 to 1992.

== Early life ==
Robert Michael Conal McNair-Wilson was born in Hampstead, London, on 12 October 1930. He attended Eton College before joining the Royal Irish Fusiliers through national service. He then worked for a period at the BBC in Northern Ireland.

== Career ==
McNair-Wilson contested the seat of Lincoln in 1964, but was beaten by Labour's Dick Taverne.

In 1969, he stood as the Conservative candidate in the Walthamstow East by-election, defeating the Labour candidate, Colin Phipps. He held the seat until 1974, when it was abolished and replaced by the new Walthamstow constituency.

In the February 1974 general election, he won the Conservative safe seat of Newbury where he remained as MP for 18 years before standing down before the 1992 general election, on health grounds.

In 1984, McNair-Wilson was diagnosed with Goodpasture syndrome, causing kidney failure and necessitating thrice-weekly kidney dialysis treatment. The Times said that his experience "transformed him from a mild but critical friend of the National Health Service to possibly its most enthusiastic supporter on the Conservative benches". He underwent a kidney transplant in 1990.

He was knighted in the 1988 Birthday Honours for political service.

== Personal life ==
His brother Patrick McNair-Wilson, who had been Conservative MP for Lewisham West from 1964 to 1966, was also a by-election winner, returning to Parliament in 1968 for the New Forest constituency.

McNair-Wilson married Deidre Granville (née Tuckett) in 1974. Their daughter Laura was elected as MP for Newbury at the 2019 general election.

McNair-Wilson died from a kidney failure on 28 March 1993 in Bucklebury, Berkshire, at the age of 62.

== See also ==
- List of political families in the United Kingdom

Parliament of the United Kingdom
Preceded by William Robinson	Member of Parliament for Walthamstow East; 1969 – February 1974	Constituency abolished
Preceded by John Astor	Member of Parliament for Newbury; February 1974 – 1992	Succeeded by Judith Chaplin
