= Francis Lucas (English politician) =

British politician

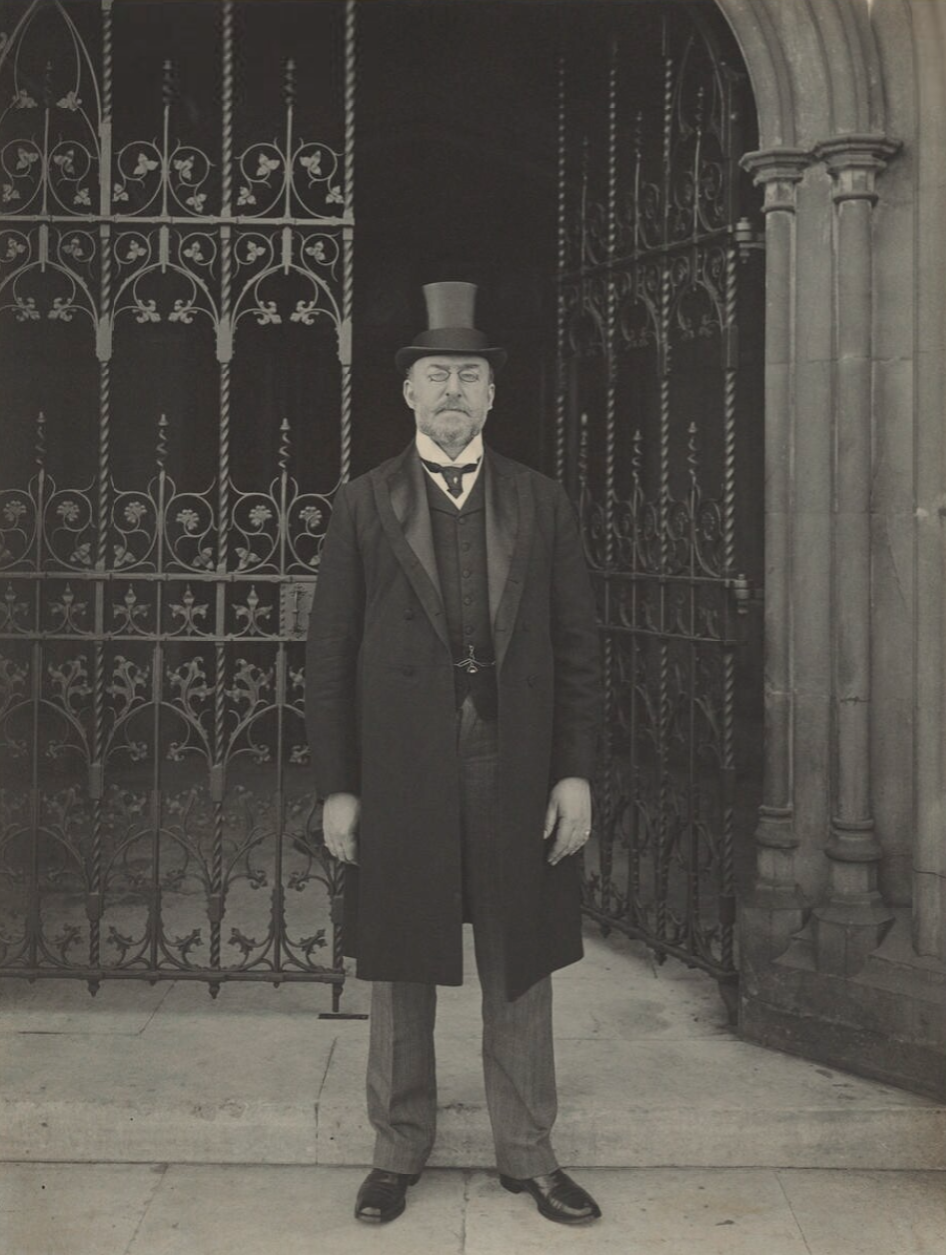
Francis Lucas, 1902 photograph

Colonel Francis Alfred Lucas (7 June 1850 – 11 December 1918) was a British company director and Conservative Party politician who lived in London and in Suffolk. He sat in the House of Commons from 1900 until his defeat in 1906. He died whilst a prospective candidate in the 1918 election and he was replaced by his wife, Alice Theresa Lucas.

== Early life ==
Lucas was the son of Sampson Lucas, of Gloucester Square, London. He was educated privately and then at University College London, after which he went into business, becoming a partner in Lucas, Nicholls and Company, a merchants firm with operations in London, Stockport and Manchester. He was a director of both Allied Insurance and Allied Marine Insurance.

He was also an actively involved in the Volunteer Force, serving for 35 years as a member of the Artists Rifles, mostly as an officer. He then became Commander of the Harwich Voluntary Infantry Brigade from 1900 to 1906.

He was also a governor of Christ's Hospital and of Guy's Hospital, and a Justice of the Peace for Suffolk, where his country residence Easton Park was located near Wickham Market.

== Political career ==
He unsuccessfully contested the Louth division of Lincolnshire at the 1895 general election, and at the 1900 general election he was elected as MP for Lowestoft, with a majority of over 20% of the votes. However, at the 1906 election, he was defeated by the Liberal candidate Edward Beauchamp, who won the seat with a 14% majority. Noting the scale of Liberal gains in the election, The Times noted the Lowestoft result as evidence that "apparently, no Unionist seat is now secure".

After his defeat in 1906, Lucas did not stand again in Lowestoft. He unsuccessfully contested the Kennington division of Lambeth at both the January 1910 and December 1910 elections, and at the 1918 general election he stood again in Kennington. However he died on 11 December 1918, aged 68, after he had already been formally nominated. This caused the election to be delayed in Kennington until his wife, Alice Theresa Lucas, could be nominated. Alice was nearly elected and she would have been the only woman MP from the 1918 election.

His death, at his London residence in Stornoway House, Cleveland Row, St James's, was due to heart failure brought about by influenza.

== Family ==
In 1887 Lucas married Alice Stern, a hospital administrator and a member of the Stern banking family. She was the younger daughter of Viscount David de Stern, a German-born banker, who co-founded the merchant bank Stern Brothers (London) .

Parliament of the United Kingdom
Preceded by Harry Foster	Member of Parliament for Lowestoft; 1900 – 1906	Succeeded by Edward Beauchamp
