= Harry Wallace (politician) =

British politician (1885–1973)

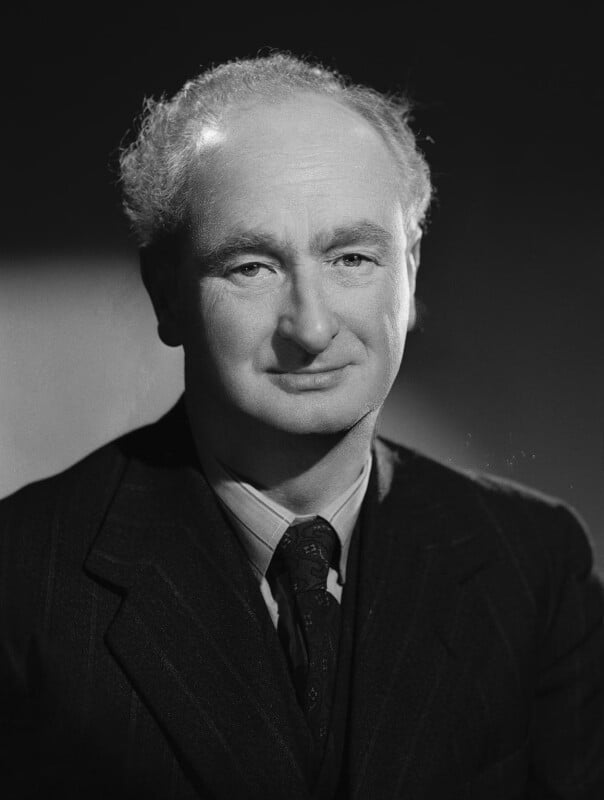
Wallace in 1947

Harry Wright Wallace (11 September 1885 – 30 April 1973) was a British Labour Party politician.

He was Assistant Secretary of the Union of Post Office Workers.

At the 1924 general election, he was unsuccessful Labour candidate at Bury in Lancashire.

At the 1929 general election, he was elected as Member of Parliament (MP) for Walthamstow East. He lost the seat two years later, as Labour's vote collapsed in the 1931 election when party split over its leader Ramsay MacDonald's formation of a National Government.

Wallace regained his seat in the Labour landslide at the 1945 general election, and held the seat until his defeat at the 1955 general election by the Conservative John Harvey.

Afterwards, he served as the Mayor of the Metropolitan Borough of Lambeth from 1952 to 1953.

Parliament of the United Kingdom
Preceded by Sir Hamar Greenwood	Member of Parliament for Walthamstow East; 1929 – 1931	Succeeded by Sir Brograve Beauchamp, Bt.
Preceded by Sir Brograve Beauchamp, Bt.	Member of Parliament for Walthamstow East; 1945 – 1955	Succeeded by John Harvey
