= Edward Beauchamp =

British politician

Sir Edward Beauchamp Bt JP
- Beauchamp in 1910

Member of Parliament for Lowestoft
- In office January 1906 – January 1910
- Preceded by: Francis Lucas
- Succeeded by: Harry Foster
- In office December 1910 – November 1922
- Preceded by: Harry Foster
- Succeeded by: Gervais Rentoul

Sir Edward Beauchamp, 1st Baronet JP (12 April 1849 – 1 February 1925) was a British businessman and Liberal Party politician.

== Background ==
Beauchamp was educated at Highgate School. He served as a midshipman in the Royal Navy. He was Chairman of Lloyd's of London from 1905 to 1913, and vice-chairman from 1915 to 1916. He was made a baronet on 27 June 1911, of Grosvenor Place, in the City of Westminster.

== Political career ==
Beauchamp was a Justice of the peace for Norfolk. At the 1906 general election, he was elected as Member of Parliament (MP) for the Lowestoft division of Suffolk. He was defeated at the January 1910 general election, but regained the seat at the December 1910 election. He was re-elected in 1918 as a Coalition Liberal, a holder the "coalition coupon" issued to supporters of the Coalition Government led by David Lloyd George. He did not contest the 1922 election, when his son Brograve stood as a National Liberal candidate, but lost by a wide margin to the Conservative Gervais Rentoul.

=== Electoral record ===
General election 1906: Lowestoft
| Party | Candidate | Votes | % | ±% |
|---|---|---|---|---|
| Liberal | Edward Beauchamp | 6,510 | 57.0 | +17.3 |
| Conservative | Francis Lucas | 4,905 | 43.0 | −17.3 |
| Majority | | 1,605 | 14.0 | n/a |
| Turnout | | 11,415 | 81.5 | +15.0 |
| Registered electors | | 14,002 | | |
| Liberal gain from Conservative | | Swing | +17.3 | |

General election January 1910: Lowestoft
| Party | Candidate | Votes | % | ±% |
|---|---|---|---|---|
| Conservative | Harry Foster | 6,530 | 50.9 | +7.9 |
| Liberal | Edward Beauchamp | 6,294 | 49.1 | −7.9 |
| Majority | | 236 | 1.8 | n/a |
| Turnout | | 12,824 | 85.0 | +3.5 |
| Registered electors | | 15,084 | | |
| Conservative gain from Liberal | | Swing | +7.9 | |

General election December 1910: Lowestoft
| Party | Candidate | Votes | % | ±% |
|---|---|---|---|---|
| Liberal | Edward Beauchamp | 6,248 | 51.1 | +2.0 |
| Conservative | Harry Foster | 5,983 | 48.9 | −2.0 |
| Majority | | 265 | 2.2 | n/a |
| Turnout | | 12,231 | 81.1 | −3.9 |
| Registered electors | | 15,084 | | |
| Liberal gain from Conservative | | Swing | +2.0 | |

General election 1918 Lowestoft
| Party | | Candidate | Votes | % | ±% |
|---|---|---|---|---|---|
| C | Liberal | Edward Beauchamp | Unopposed | | |
| | Liberal hold | | | | |
C indicates candidate endorsed by the coalition government.

== Family ==
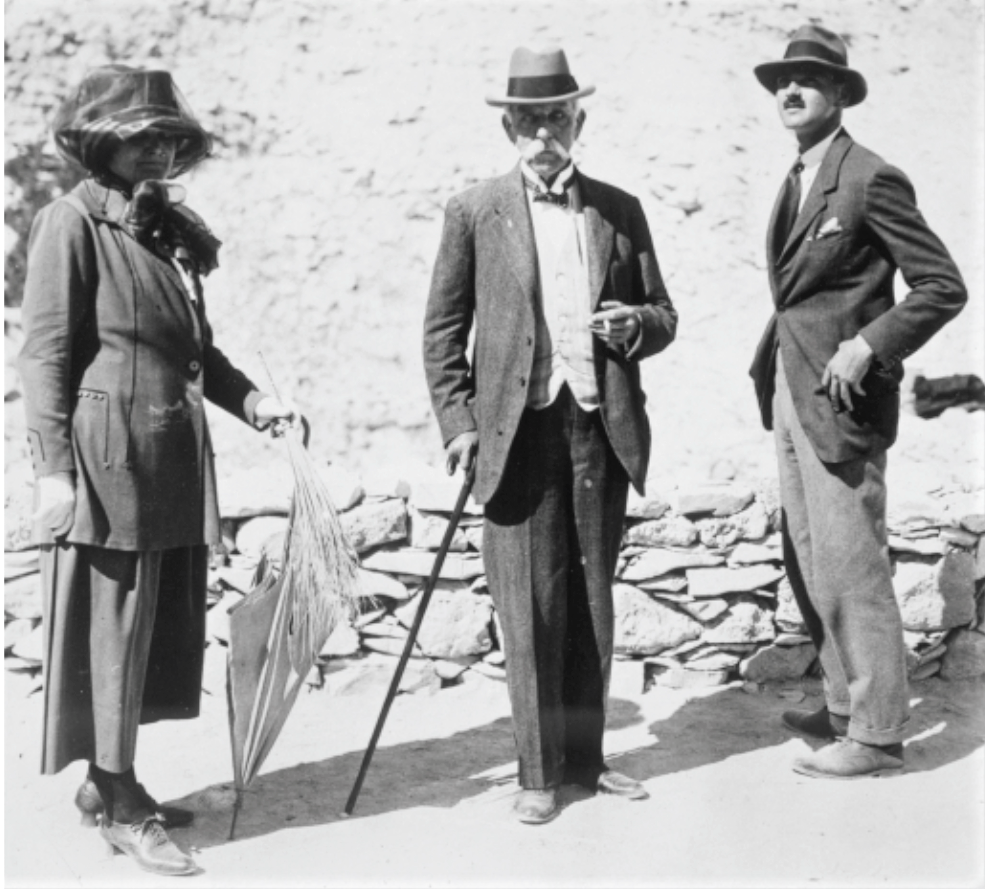
Beauchamp (centre) with his wife and son Brograve visiting Tutankhamen's tomb in 1923

Beauchamp was the second son of Reverend William Henry Beauchamp, who in turn was the second son of Sir William Beauchamp-Proctor, 3rd Baronet. He was married twice:

1. On 20 July 1875 to Frances Mary (née Stephen), daughter of James Stephen. She died on 7 May 1886, having had two children with Edward Beauchamp:
  - Esmé Frances Nevill Augusta Beauchamp (17 June 1876 - 2 January 1913)
  - Arthur Sholto Beauchamp (28 February 1880 – 29 December 1880)
2. On 2 June 1890 to Betty Campbell (née Woods), the daughter of Archibald Woods, an American. She died on 26 January 1946, having had two children with Edward Beauchamp:
  - Edward Archibald Beauchamp (5 April 1891 – 22 December 1914), a Second Lieutenant serving in the Coldstream Guards, killed in the First World War
  - Brograve Campbell Beauchamp (5 May 1897 – 25 August 1976), who succeeded to the baronetcy and was Conservative MP for Walthamstow East from 1931 to 1945.

Parliament of the United Kingdom
| Preceded by Francis Lucas | Member of Parliament for Lowestoft; 1906 – January 1910 | Succeeded by Harry Foster |
| Preceded by Harry Foster | Member of Parliament for Lowestoft; December 1910 – 1922 | Succeeded by Gervais Rentoul |
Baronetage of the United Kingdom
| New title | Baronet (of Grosvenor Place); 1911–1925 | Succeeded by Brograve Beauchamp |
