= Harry Foster (politician) =

British politician (1855–1938)

Sir Harry Foster
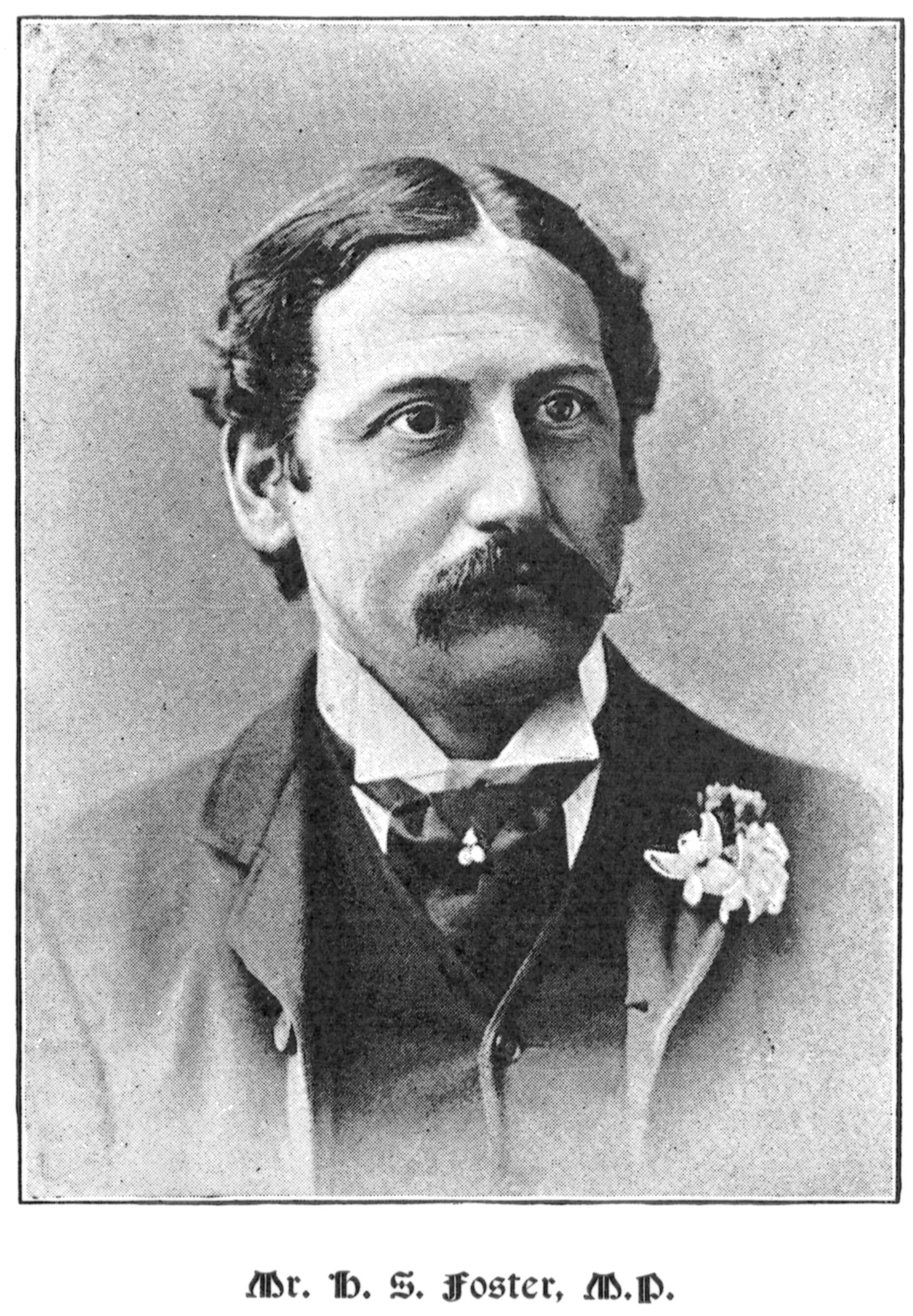
- Pictured in Suffolk Celebrities, 1893

Member of Parliament for Portsmouth Central
- In office 29 October 1924 – 30 May 1929
- Preceded by: Thomas Bramsdon
- Succeeded by: Glenvil Hall

Member of Parliament for Lowestoft
- In office 10 February 1910 – 19 December 1910
- Preceded by: Edward Beauchamp
- Succeeded by: Edward Beauchamp
- In office 26 July 1892 – 24 October 1900
- Preceded by: Savile Crossley
- Succeeded by: Francis Lucas

Personal details
- Born: Harry Seymour Foster; 29 April 1855
- Died: 20 June 1938 (aged 83)
- Party: Conservative
- Spouse: Amy Sparks
- Children: 6

Sir Harry Seymour Foster (29 April 1855 - 20 June 1938) was a British Conservative Party politician who served as a Member of Parliament (MP) for three non-consecutive periods between 1892 and 1929.

== Early life ==
He was the second son of Samuel Green Foster of London.

He was a Justice of the Peace and Deputy Lieutenant for Suffolk, and in the Commission of Lieutenancy for the City of London, where he was appointed a Sheriff of London for 1891. He was Consul-General of Persia from 1892 to 1923.

== Political career ==
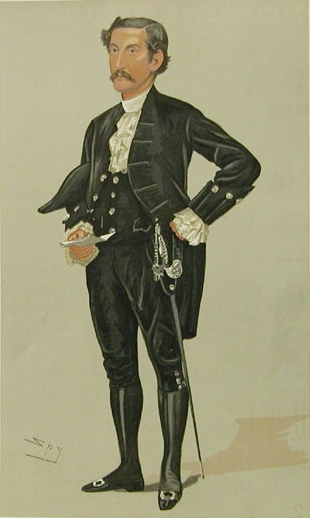
Foster caricatured by Spy in Vanity Fair, 1891

He was elected at the 1892 general election as MP for the Lowestoft division of Suffolk. He was re-elected in 1895, but did not defend his seat at the general election in 1900. He stood again at the January 1910 election, regaining the seat from the Edward Beauchamp, the Liberal who had won it in 1906. Foster's return to the House of Commons was short, as Beauchamp retook the seat at the December 1910 election.

After his defeat in 1910, Foster did not stand again until the 1924 general election, when he was selected as the Conservative candidate to replace Sir Thomas Bramsdon in Portsmouth Central. He won the seat, but stood down from Parliament at the 1929 general election.

He was a party in Foster v Driscoll [1929] 1 KB 470 involving a contract for the supply of whisky to the US during the prohibition era. The English courts refused to enforce the contract (even though governed by and lawful under English law), as its performance was unlawful under the law of the place of intended performance.

== Personal life ==
He married Amy, the daughter of John Sparks of Eastbourne and had 3 sons and 3 daughters.

Parliament of the United Kingdom
Preceded by Sir Savile Crossley	Member of Parliament for Lowestoft; 1892–1900	Succeeded by Francis Lucas
Preceded by Edward Beauchamp	Member of Parliament for Lowestoft; January 1910 – December 1910	Succeeded by Sir Edward Beauchamp
Preceded by Sir Thomas Bramsdon	Member of Parliament for Portsmouth Central; 1924–1929	Succeeded by Glenvil Hall
