= Lady Evelyn Beauchamp =

Present at opening of Tutankhamun's tomb

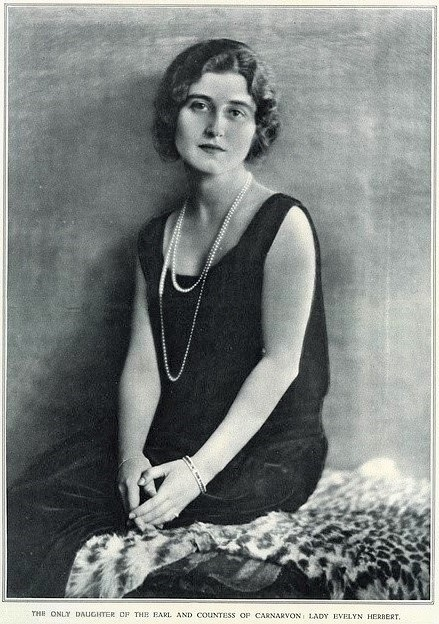
- Lady Evelyn in 1923
- Born: Evelyn Leonora Almina Herbert; 15 August 1901; Highclere Castle, Hampshire, England
- Died: 31 January 1980 (aged 78); London, England
- Known for: Present at the opening of Tutankhamun's tomb
- Spouse: Brograve Beauchamp (m. 1923; d. 1976)
- Children: 1

Lady Evelyn Leonora Almina Beauchamp (/ˈbiːtʃəm/ BEE-chəm; née Herbert; 15 August 1901 – 31 January 1980), always known to her family as Eve, was the daughter of George Herbert, 5th Earl of Carnarvon. In November 1922, she, her father, and the archaeologist Howard Carter were the first people in modern times to enter the tomb of the Egyptian Pharaoh Tutankhamun. She later married Sir Brograve Beauchamp and had a daughter. Lady Evelyn died in 1980, at the age of 78.

== Early life ==
Lady Evelyn Leonora Almina Herbert was born on 15 August 1901, the second child and only daughter of George Herbert, 5th Earl of Carnarvon and Almina Herbert, Countess of Carnarvon. Her older brother was Henry Herbert, 6th Earl of Carnarvon.

Her childhood was spent mainly at Highclere Castle, the family's country house in Hampshire. Looked after by a nanny and a governess, she and her brother were seldom in the company of her parents. As Evelyn grew older she however became closer to her father, her brother observing that she became "the apple of my father's eye – he worshipped her and they were the closest of friends until he died. She had a great influence of good on him and healed many a breach between my father and mother which no-one else could have achieved". She took an interest in her father's Egyptian explorations, and from 1921 she accompanied him on his annual visit to Egypt. While journeying to Egypt in January 1923, the journalist Valentine Williams noted "the tender friendship" between father and daughter that was "delightful to watch", while Howard Carter referred to Evelyn as her father's "devoted companion in all his Egyptian work".

Lady Evelyn was launched as a debutante and presented at court in 1920, with her mother staging receptions for her, including at the British Residency in Cairo during their Egyptian stays in 1921 and 1922. It was during one of these receptions that she met her future husband, Brograve Beauchamp, the son of the Liberal MP Sir Edward Beauchamp, who continued to visit her when they both returned to England.

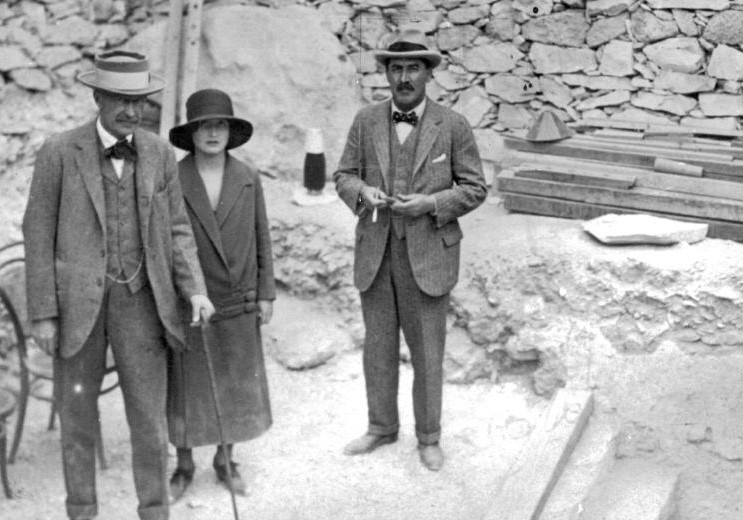
Lord Carnarvon, Lady Evelyn Herbert and Howard Carter at the top of the steps leading to the newly discovered tomb of Tutankhamun, November 1922.

== Tutankhamun's Tomb ==
Lord and Lady Carnarvon often spent the winter in Egypt, where they bought antiquities for their collection in England. In 1906 Lord Carnarvon obtained a concession to excavate sites near Luxor. From 1907, he employed Howard Carter to supervise this work including, from 1914, a systematic search of the Valley of the Kings for any tombs missed by previous expeditions, in particular that of the Pharaoh Tutankhamun. By 1922 little of significance had been found and Lord Carnarvon decided this would be the final year he would fund the work.

However, on 4 November 1922, Carter was able to send a telegram to Lord Carnarvon, in England at the time, saying:
"At last have made wonderful discovery in Valley; a magnificent tomb with seals intact; re-covered same for your arrival; congratulations".

Lady Evelyn accompanied her father to Egypt, and arrived at Luxor on 23 November 1922. Both were present the next day when the full extent of the stairway to the tomb was cleared and a seal containing Tutankhamun's cartouche found on the outer doorway. This door was removed and the rubble filled corridor behind cleared, revealing the door of the tomb itself. Lady Evelyn was also present when, on 26 November, Carter made a tiny breach in the top left hand corner of the tomb doorway, enabling him to peer in by the light of a candle. When Carnarvon asked, "Can you see anything?" Carter replied "Yes, wonderful things!". The tomb was then secured, to be entered in the presence of an official of the Egyptian Department of Antiquities the next day.

However that night, Carter, his assistant Arthur Callender, Carnarvon and Lady Evelyn apparently made an unauthorised visit, becoming the first people in modern times to enter the tomb. Some sources suggest that the group also entered the inner burial chamber. In this account, a small hole was found in the chamber's sealed doorway and Carter, Carnarvon and Lady Evelyn crawled through. The diary of Lord Carnarvon's half-brother Mervyn Herbert notes that Evelyn told him that the group entered the 'second chamber', and that Evelyn, being the smallest, was the first to enter the burial chamber.

The next morning, 27 November, saw an inspection of the tomb in the presence of an Egyptian official. Callender rigged up electric lighting, illuminating a vast haul of items, including gilded couches, chests, thrones, and shrines. They also saw evidence of two further chambers, including the sealed doorway to the inner burial chamber, guarded by two life-size statues of Tutankhamun. In spite of evidence of break-ins in ancient times, the tomb was virtually intact, and would ultimately be found to contain over 5,000 items.

On 29 November, the tomb was officially opened in the presence of a number of invited dignitaries and Egyptian officials, with Lady Evelyn arranging a luncheon party afterwards for the guests.

Lady Evelyn and her father travelled back to England in December 1922, the two returning in January 1923 to be present at the official opening of the inner burial chamber on 16 February. The same month, Brograve Beauchamp visited with his parents, Howard Carter providing a tour of Tutankhamun's Tomb. Soon afterwards Lord Carnarvon contracted blood poisoning and, after travelling to Cairo with Evelyn, he died on 5 April 1923. Lady Evelyn left Egypt to return to England with her brother, Lady Carnarvon following with Lord Carnarvon's remains a week later. This was Lady Evelyn's last visit to Egypt. She did, however, maintain contact with Howard Carter and was present at his funeral at Putney Vale Cemetery in 1939.

Lady Evelyn attended the opening of the Tutankhamun 50th anniversary celebrations in 1972, including the Treasures of Tutankhamun exhibition at the British Museum, London, where she was presented to Queen Elizabeth II who was there to open the exhibition.

== Marriage and later life ==
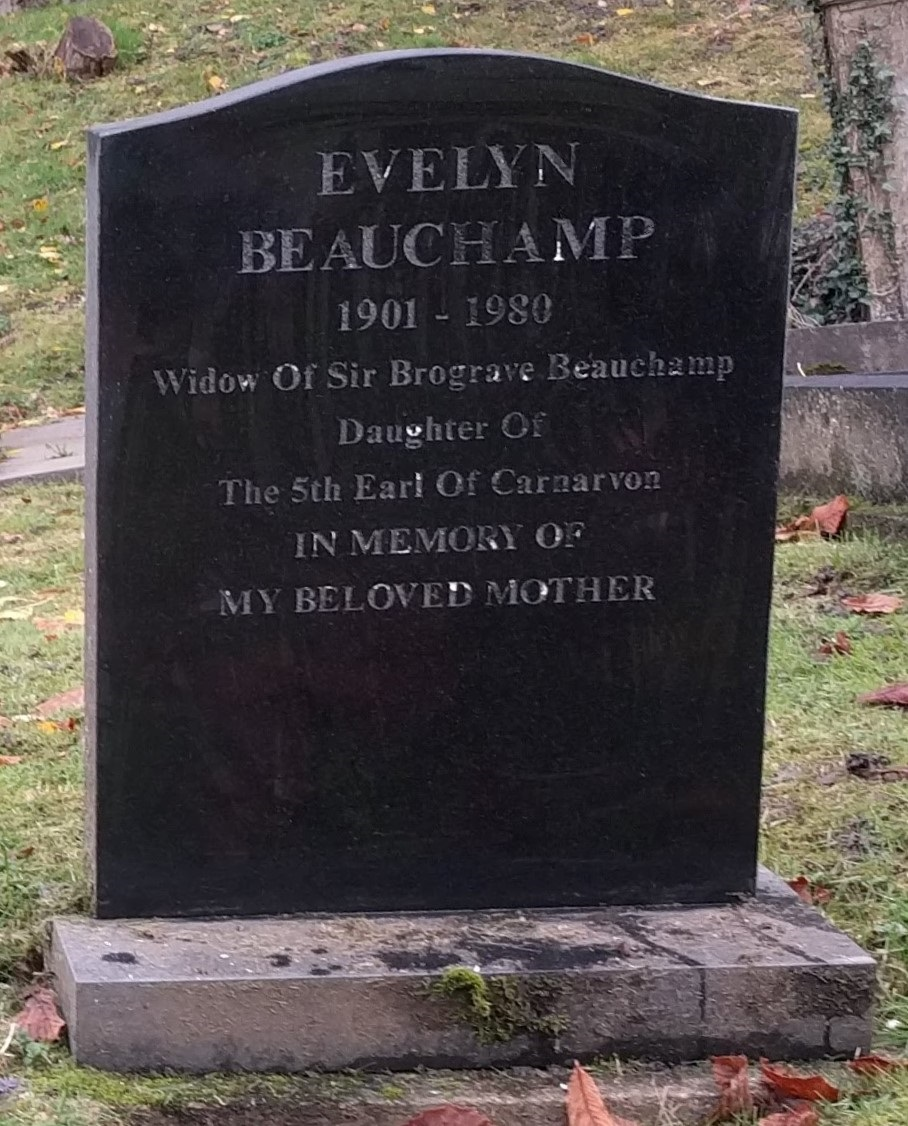
Lady Evelyn's grave in Putney Vale Cemetery (2019)

On 8 October 1923, Lady Evelyn Herbert married Brograve Beauchamp at St Margaret's, Westminster. They had one child, Patricia Evelyn Beauchamp (11 July 1925 – 7 October 2014). It was a difficult birth, after which Evelyn was told she would not be able to have more children. In 1949 Patricia married Major Michael William Thomas Leatham, and had two sons, Simon Anthony Michael Leatham (born 1951) and Edward Arthur Martyn Leatham (born 1953).

Brograve became a baronet on the death of his father in February 1925. He served as Conservative Member of Parliament for Walthamstow East from 1931 to 1945, and died 25 August 1976 at the age of 79.

Like her father and brother, Lady Evelyn owned a number of racehorses and often attended race meetings, being described in the press as "petite, charming and immensely popular in racing circles". She was also closely involved in London Society and regularly appeared in Society publications like The Tatler. She remained on close terms with her brother Henry, and helped supervise the refurbishment and modernisation of Highclere after Henry became 6th Earl.

In July 1935 she was injured in a serious car accident on her way to Newmarket, Suffolk, and recuperated in the London nursing home established by her mother during the First World War. She later suffered from a number of strokes.

Lady Evelyn died in London on 31 January 1980 aged 78, three years after Sir Brograve. She is buried beside her husband in Putney Vale Cemetery in South West London. Howard Carter is also buried at Putney Vale.

== Relationship with Howard Carter ==
Lady Evelyn had known Howard Carter, 27 years her senior, since she was a child, with Carter often visiting the Carnarvon's homes in London and Hampshire. From 1920, Evelyn began to accompany her father on his annual winter trips to Egypt, where she and Carter were on friendly terms. While there were later suggestions of a discreet romantic relationship between the two, there is no evidence of any rumour or gossip among those present at the time. Lady Evelyn denied the idea, later telling her daughter Patricia that "at first I was in awe of him, later I was rather frightened of him", she resenting Carter's "determination" to come between her and her father. More recently, the 8th Earl of Carnarvon dismissed the story, describing Carter as a "stoical loner".

== In popular culture ==
Lady Evelyn Herbert has been portrayed in films, television productions, and novels, with varying degrees of accuracy:

- By Angharad Rees in the 1980 Columbia Pictures Television production The Curse of King Tut's Tomb.
- By Alexandra Weaver in the 2005 BBC TV docudrama series Egypt, episodes one The Search for Tutankhamun, and two The Curse of Tutankhamun.
- By Amy Wren in the 2016 British ITV series Tutankhamun.
- By Marie Benedict in the 2026 novel Daughter of Egypt.
- In the movie Stargate (1994) and the TV series Stargate: SG-1, the character Catherine Langford (played by numerous actresses) is based on Evelyn Herbert.
- In The Mummy (1999) and its sequels The Mummy Returns (2001) and The Mummy: Tomb of the Dragon Emperor (2008), the character Evelyn Carnahan, played at different points of the series by Rachel Weisz and Maria Bello, is named in tribute to Lady Evelyn Carnarvon, whose father is described as one of Egyptology's "finest patrons", and a "famous explorer".

The German language novel Der König von Luxor by Philipp Vandenberg published in 2014 includes a largely fictionalised Lady Evelyn Beauchamp as one of the three principal characters.

The novel The Collector's Daughter by Gill Paul published in 2021 provides a fictional version of Lady Evelyn against a backdrop of the events at the time of the tomb's discovery.

== Notes and references ==
=== General sources ===
- Carnarvon, Countess of (2012). Lady Almina and the Real Downton Abbey. The Lost Legacy of Highclere Castle. London: Hodder & Stoughton Ltd. ISBN 978-1-444-73084 5.
- Carnarvon, Countess of (2013). Lady Catherine and the Real Downton Abbey. London: Hodder & Stoughton Ltd. ISBN 978-1-444-76210 5.
- Carter, Howard. Excavation journals, 1922–1930. The Griffith Institute, Oxford.
- Carter, Howard; Mace, Arthur (1923). The tomb of Tut Ankh Amen, volume 1. London. OCLC 471731240.
- Cross, William (2016). Carnarvon, Carter and Tutankhamun Revisited: The Hidden Truths and Doomed Relationships. The author. ISBN 978-1-905914-36-4.
- Herbert, Henry (1976). No Regrets: Memoirs of the Earl of Carnarvon. London: Weidenfeld and Nicolson. ISBN 0297772465.
- Herbert, Henry (1980). Ermine Tales: More memoirs of the Earl of Carnarvon. London: Weidenfeld and Nicolson. ISBN 0297777637.
- Hoving, Thomas (1978). Tutankhamun: The Untold Story. London: Cooper Square Publishing. ISBN 9780815411864.
- Lucas, Alfred (1942). "Notes on some of the objects from the tomb of Tutankhamun". Annales du service des antiquités de l'Égypte (41).
- Price, Bill (2007). Tutankhamun, Egypt's Most Famous Pharaoh. Hertfordshire: Pocket Essentials. ISBN 978-1842432402.
- Winstone, H.V.F. (2006). Howard Carter and the discovery of the tomb of Tutankhamun. Manchester: Barzan. ISBN 1-905521-04-9. OCLC 828501310.
