= John Harvey (British politician) =

British politician (1920–2008)

John Edgar Harvey CBE (4 April 1920 – 13 January 2008) was a British Conservative Party politician.

== Early life ==
Harvey was born in Derry. He attended Xavierian College in Bruges and Lyme Regis Grammar School. During the Second World War, he served in the Merchant Navy.

== Parliamentary career ==
He was elected at the 1955 general election as Member of Parliament (MP) for Walthamstow East, retaining the seat with a majority of 1,129 over the sitting Labour MP Harry Wallace. Harvey held his seat at the next two general elections, until his defeat at the 1966 election by Labour's William Robinson.

== After politics ==
After losing his seat in 1966, he left politics to concentrate on his business career. He was a director and deputy chairman of Burmah Castrol Europe until his retirement. Harvey lived in Loughton, and was a verderer of Epping Forest.

He was appointed CBE in the 1994 Birthday Honours for political and public service.

Harvey should not be confused with John Harvey-Jones, former chairman of ICI who died in the same week.

Parliament of the United Kingdom
Preceded by Harry Wallace	Member of Parliament for Walthamstow East; 1955–1966	Succeeded by William Robinson
