= Almina Herbert, Countess of Carnarvon =

British peeress (1876–1969)

The Right Honourable The Countess of Carnarvon
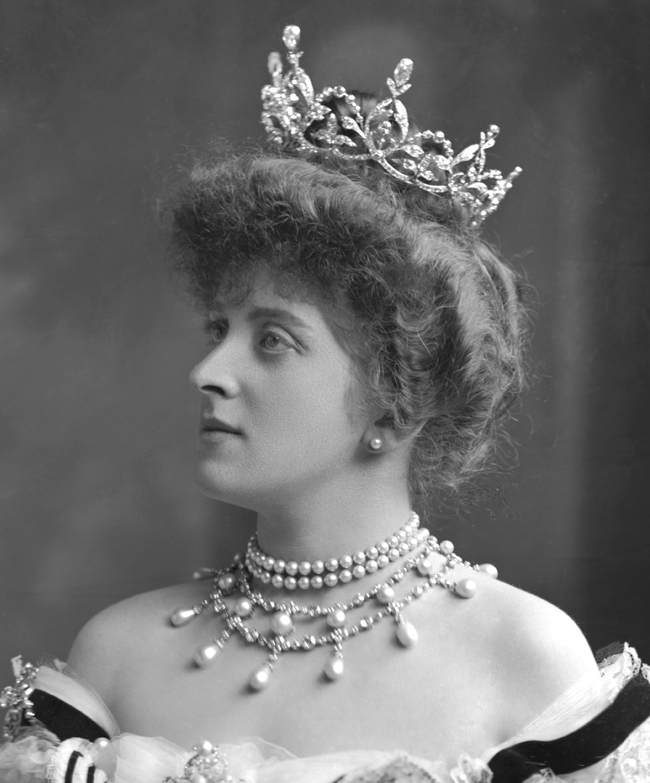
- Lady Carnarvon, 1900
- Born: Almina Victoria Marie Alexandra Wombwell; 14 April 1876; Mayfair, London
- Died: 8 May 1969 (aged 93); Frenchay Hospital, Bristol, England
- Spouses: George Herbert, 5th Earl of Carnarvon (m. 1895; died 1923) Ian Onslow Dennistoun (m. 1923; died 1938)
- Children: Henry Herbert, 6th Earl of Carnarvon; Lady Evelyn Beauchamp
- Parent(s): Alfred de Rothschild (biological); Frederick Charles Wombwell; Marie Boyer

Almina Herbert, Countess of Carnarvon (née Wombwell; 14 April 1876 – 28 May 1969), was an English socialite, heiress, and philanthropist. She was the wife of George Herbert, 5th Earl of Carnarvon, and châtelaine of Highclere Castle in Hampshire. After her second marriage, she became Mrs Almina Dennistoun, although she called herself Almina Carnarvon. The illegitimate daughter of banker Alfred de Rothschild, Almina inherited a large fortune that funded her husband's estate and the search for Tutankhamun's tomb in Egypt.

== Early life ==
She was born Almina Victoria Marie Alexandra Wombwell, in Mayfair, London, the nominal child of Marie "Mina" Wombwell (née Boyer), the French wife of Captain Frederick Charles Wombwell, a businessman and retired British Army officer. However, her biological father was the banker Alfred de Rothschild, of the Rothschild family, who provided her with considerable wealth.

== Marriage ==
On 26 June 1895, aged 19, she married George Edward Stanhope Molyneux Herbert, 5th Earl of Carnarvon at St Margaret's, Westminster. The couple had two children:

- Henry Herbert, 6th Earl of Carnarvon (1898–1987), who married Anne Catherine Tredick Wendell and had one son, (the 7th Earl) and one daughter.
- Lady Evelyn Leonora Almina Herbert (1901–1980), who married Sir Brograve Campbell Beauchamp, 2nd Bt. and had a daughter.

=== Dowry and inheritance ===
Alfred de Rothschild provided Almina with a generous marriage settlement, which included a covenant to transfer £500,000 to the Trustees of her marriage settlement from his estate (equivalent to £56,842,000 in 2025). The marriage settlement also provided Almina a life annuity of £12,000, which would be payable to Lord Carnarvon in the event he outlived Almina; Rothschild also paid off Carnarvon's substantial debts prior to the wedding.

Following Alfred de Rothschild's death in 1918, Almina inherited the freehold and contents of his London house, No. 1 Seamore Place, Mayfair, and £50,000 (equivalent to £2,456,000 in 2025); her husband and children were each also bequeathed £25,000 each from Rothschild's estate.

1 Seamore Place was eventually offered for sale in June 1929; and it remained on the market until after March 1930. The house was advertised as "one of the finest small mansions in London," containing a reception hall, six reception rooms, a library, study, 6 principle bed and dressing rooms, ten secondary and staff bedrooms, five bathrooms, and staff offices.

=== Countess of Carnarvon ===
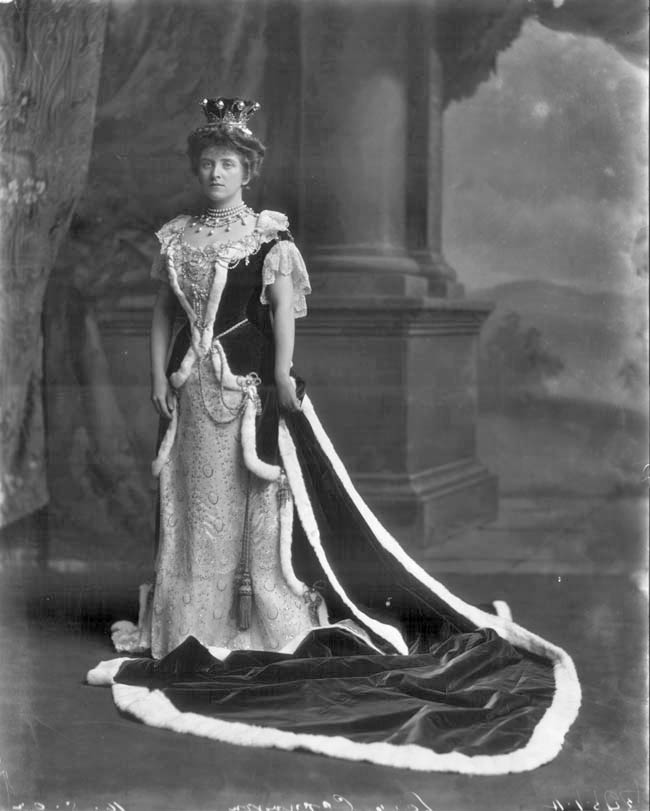
Lady Carnarvon at the Coronation of Edward VII, 9 August 1902

At the beginning of the First World War, Lady Carnarvon opened a hospital for war wounded at Highclere Castle, helping with the organisation and assisting as a nurse. As Lady Carnarvon's Hospital for Officers, financed by Alfred de Rothschild, in January 1916 it moved to № 48, Bryanston Square, Marylebone, where it had forty beds, and was carried on there until 1919.

In 1919, Lady Carnarvon turned down an appointment as a Commander of the Order of the British Empire for her war work.

The Earl of Carnarvon developed an interest in Egyptology and became the financial backer of the search for Tutankhamun's tomb in the Valley of the Kings, Egypt, assisted by Almina's wealth. The Earl often wintered in Egypt. Almina accompanied him in the earlier years, but was not present in November 1922 at the opening of the newly discovered tomb.

In March 1923, Lady Carnarvon travelled to Egypt to join her husband, who was seriously ill with pneumonia. He died on 5 April 1923, and Almina returned to Britain with his body later that month. She continued to provide financial support for Carter's excavation of the tomb until 1925, when she reached a settlement with the Egyptian authorities whereby she gave up any claim on the contents of the tomb in return for £36,000 compensation.

The Carnarvons' only son, Henry Herbert (1898–1987), succeeded his father as sixth earl.

=== Second marriage ===
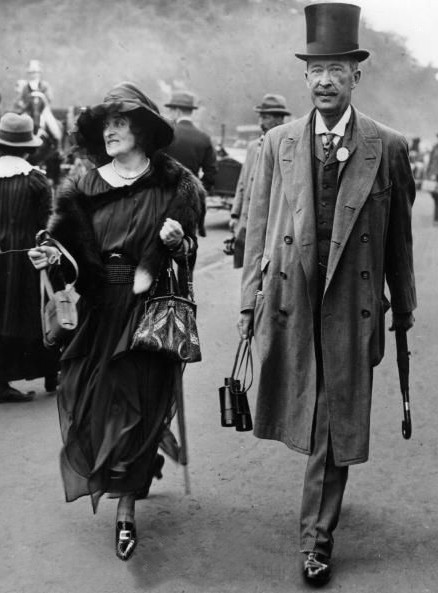
Lady and Lord Carnarvon at the races in June 1921.

In December 1923, eight months after Lord Carnarvon's death, Lady Carnarvon married Lieutenant Colonel Ian Onslow Dennistoun, a retired Grenadier Guards officer. She reportedly provided her second husband with a £100,000 marriage settlement in order to "surround him with the utmost dignity".

In 1925, Almina was involved in a much-publicised High Court case, known as the "Bachelor's Case", between Colonel Dennistoun and his former wife, Dorothy Dennistoun. When they had divorced, Dennistoun had been unable to pay ancillary relief and instead had promised he would provide for his ex-wife in the future, when he had funds. After hearing about Almina's wealth, Dorothy Dennistoun demanded the alimony she had been promised. Almina saw this as blackmail and persuaded her new husband to contest the claim in the courts, in what Sir Henry McCardie, who tried the case, called "the most bitterly conducted litigation I have ever known". A courtroom speech by Norman Birkett persuaded the jury to decide to disregard the agreement of Dennistoun to pay ancillary relief to his former wife.

=== Later life ===
After the death of Lord Carnarvon, Almina was provided with a house in the grounds of Highclere Castle, before she and Colonel Dennistoun moved to the Isle of Wight. Colonel Dennistoun, an asthmatic, often suffered from poor health and died in 1938. Almina then rented a house in Regent's Park in London, before moving in 1943 to a cottage near Minehead in Somerset. Although she received financial support from her son, she continued to live well above her means and faced mounting debts, and in 1951 she was declared bankrupt.

Almina sold her Somerset cottage and moved to a terraced house in Bristol, where she lived with her housekeeper and companion Anne Leadbetter. Almina died on 8 May 1969 aged 93 at the Frenchay Hospital, Bristol.

== Sources ==
- Cross, William The Life and Secrets of Almina Carnarvon : 5th Countess of Carnarvon of Tutankhamun Fame , 3rd Ed 2011 ( ISBN 978-1-905914-08-1).
- Hyde, H. Montgomery (1965). Norman Birkett: The Life of Lord Birkett of Ulverston. Hamish Hamilton. ASIN B000O8CESO. OCLC 255057963.
- Winstone, H. V. F. (2006). Howard Carter and the discovery of the tomb of Tutankhamun (rev. ed.). Barzan, Manchester. ISBN 1-905521-04-9.
