= George Herbert, 5th Earl of Carnarvon =

British aristocrat (1866–1923)

The Right Honourable The Earl of Carnarvon DL
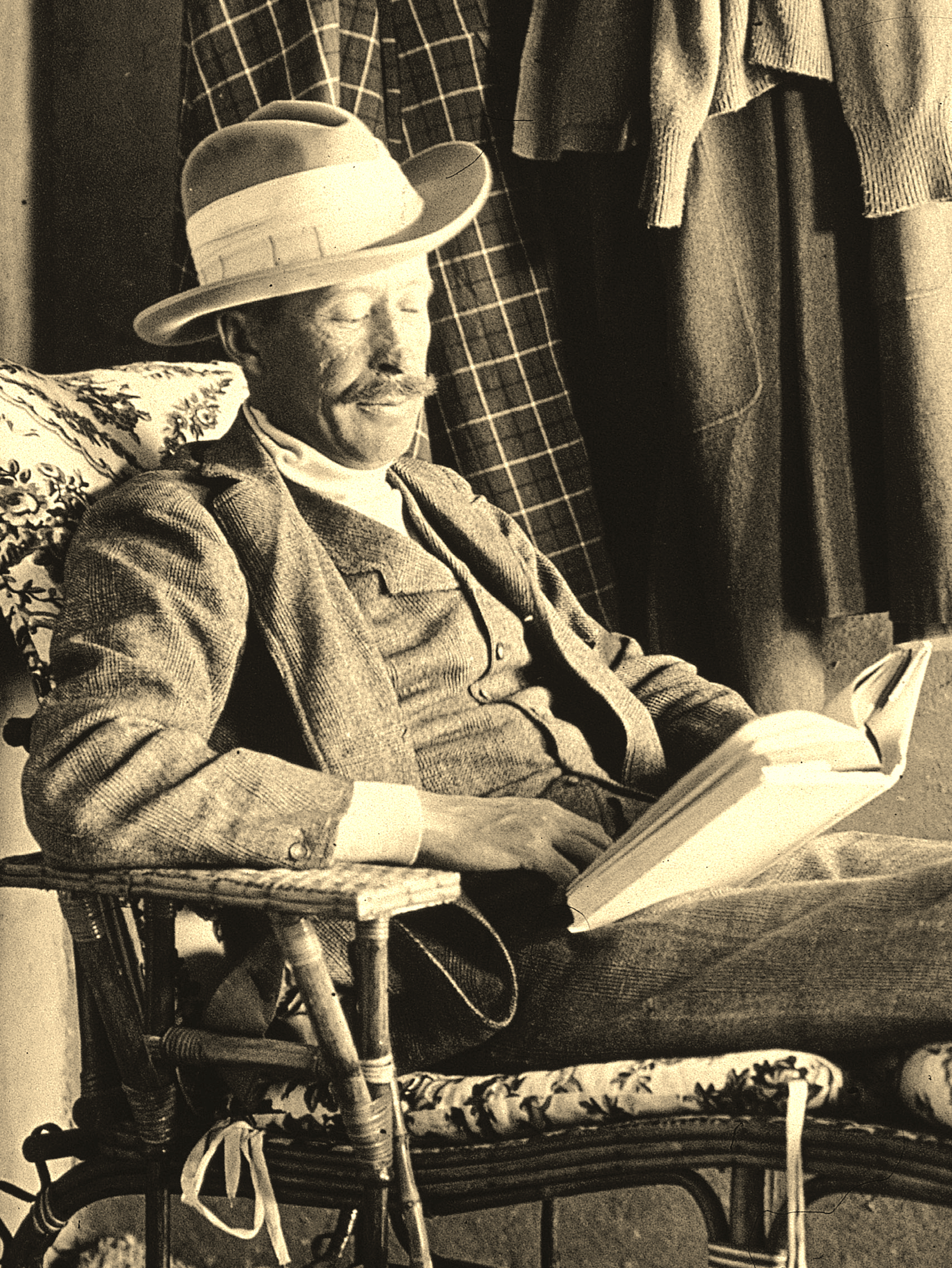
- Lord Carnarvon, who was the chief financial backer on many of Howard Carter's Egyptian excavations.
- Tenure: 29 June 1890 – 5 April 1923
- Predecessor: Henry Herbert, 4th Earl of Carnarvon
- Successor: Henry Herbert, 6th Earl of Carnarvon
- Other titles: Lord Porchester (until 1890)
- Known for: Discovery of Tutankhamun's tomb
- Born: George Edward Stanhope Molyneux Herbert; 26 June 1866; 66 Grosvenor Street, Mayfair, London, England
- Died: 5 April 1923 (aged 56); Cairo, Kingdom of Egypt
- Buried: Beacon Hill, Burghclere, Hampshire
- Residence: Highclere Castle
- Spouse: Almina Wombwell (m. 1895)
- Issue: Henry Herbert, 6th Earl of Carnarvon; Lady Evelyn Beauchamp
- Parents: Henry Herbert, 4th Earl of Carnarvon; Lady Evelyn Stanhope

George Edward Stanhope Molyneux Herbert, 5th Earl of Carnarvon (26 June 1866 – 5 April 1923), styled Lord Porchester until 1890, was an English peer and aristocrat best known as the financial backer of the search for and excavation of Tutankhamun's tomb in the Valley of the Kings.

== Background and education ==
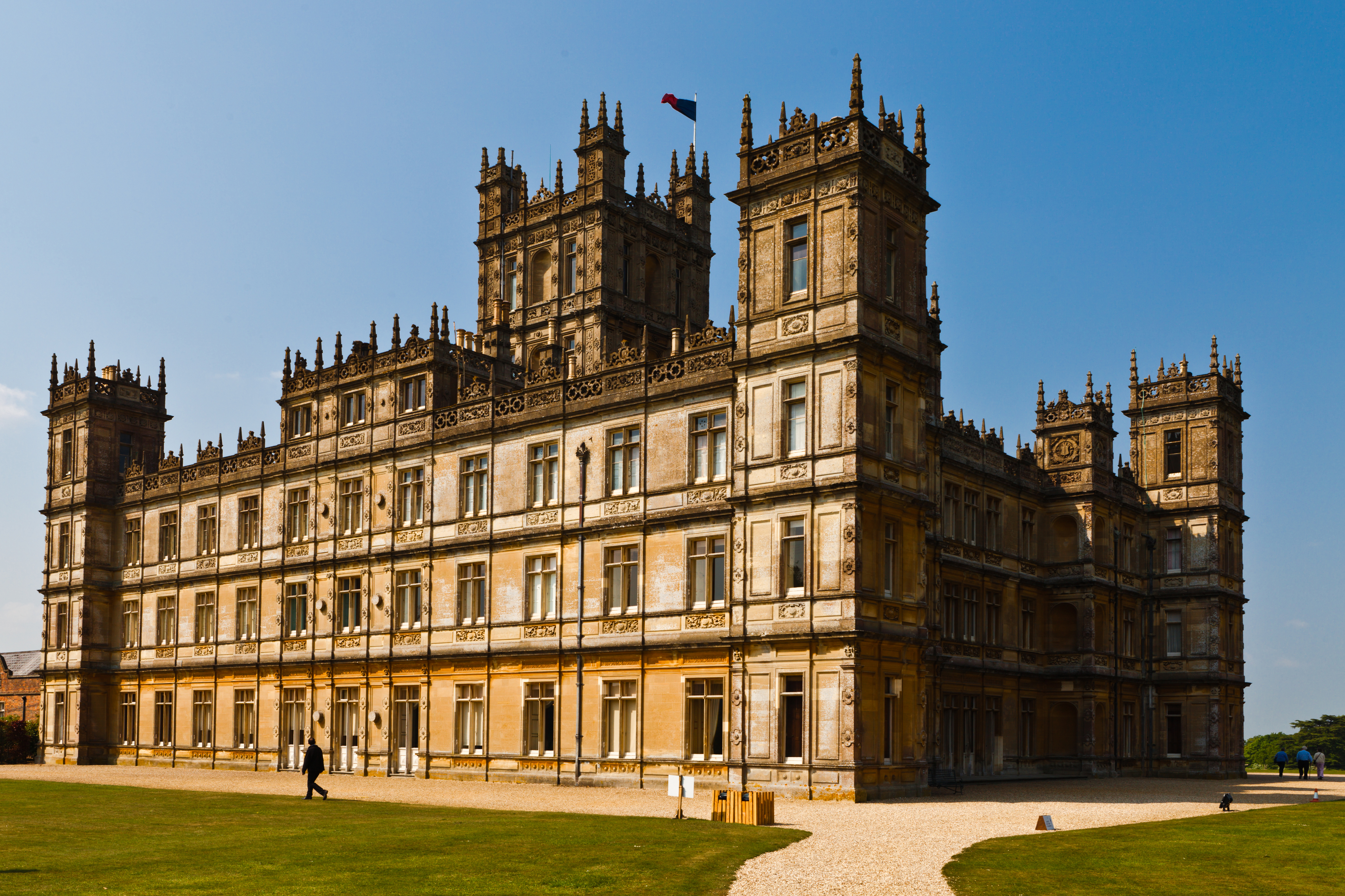
Highclere Castle, Hampshire, seat of Lord Carnarvon.

Styled Lord Porchester from birth, he was born at 66 Grosvenor Street, Mayfair, London, the only son of Henry Herbert, 4th Earl of Carnarvon, a distinguished Tory statesman, by his first wife Lady Evelyn Stanhope, daughter of Anne and George Stanhope, 6th Earl of Chesterfield. Aubrey Herbert was his half-brother. He was educated at Eton College and Trinity College, Cambridge. He inherited the Bretby Hall estate in Derbyshire from his maternal grandmother, Anne Elizabeth, Dowager Countess of Chesterfield in 1885, and succeeded his father in the earldom in 1890.

He was High Steward of Newbury.

== Family ==
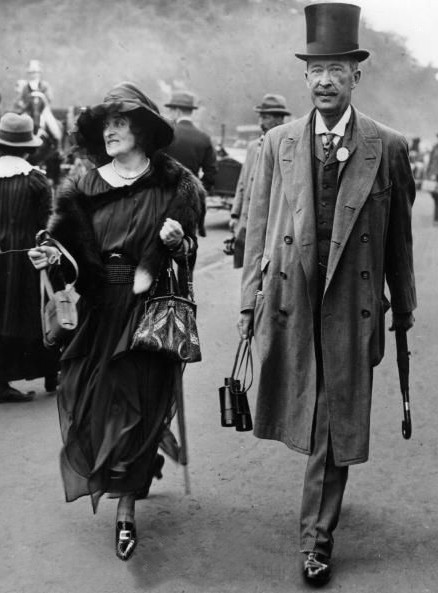
Lady and Lord Carnarvon at the races in June 1921.

Lord Carnarvon married Almina Victoria Maria Alexandra Wombwell, alleged to be the illegitimate daughter of millionaire banker Alfred de Rothschild, of the Rothschild family, at St Margaret's Church, Westminster, on 26 June 1895. Rothschild provided a marriage settlement of £500,000 (equivalent to £56.8 million in 2025), and paid off all Lord Carnarvon's existing debts. The Carnarvons had two children:

- Henry George Herbert, 6th Earl of Carnarvon (1898–1987), who married Anne Catherine Tredick Wendell (d. 1977) and had one son (the 7th Earl) and one daughter. They divorced in 1936, and from 1939 to 1947, he was married to actress and dancer Tilly Losch.
- Lady Evelyn Leonora Almina Herbert (1901–1980), who married Sir Brograve Beauchamp, 2nd Baronet, and had a daughter.

== Horse racing ==
Exceedingly wealthy due to his marriage settlement, Carnarvon was at first best known as an owner of racehorses, and in 1902 he established Highclere Stud to breed thoroughbred racehorses. He joined the Jockey Club and in 1905 was appointed one of the stewards at the new Newbury Racecourse and acted as a steward at other racecourses. His family has maintained the connection ever since. His grandson, the 7th Earl, was racing manager to Queen Elizabeth II from 1969 until he died in 2001.

== Egyptology ==
Carnarvon was an enthusiastic amateur Egyptologist and also bought Egyptian antiquities for their collection in England. In 1907, Carnarvon undertook to sponsor the excavation of nobles' tombs in Deir el-Bahri, near Thebes. He employed Howard Carter to undertake the work on the recommendation of Gaston Maspero, director of the Egyptian Antiquities Department.

Carnarvon was a keen motor-car driver. In 1909, he suffered a serious motoring accident near Bad Schwalbach in Germany, after which he never fully recovered his health. After a lengthy convalescence his doctors advised that he winter out of England and from then on he and Lady Carnarvon often spent their winters in Egypt.

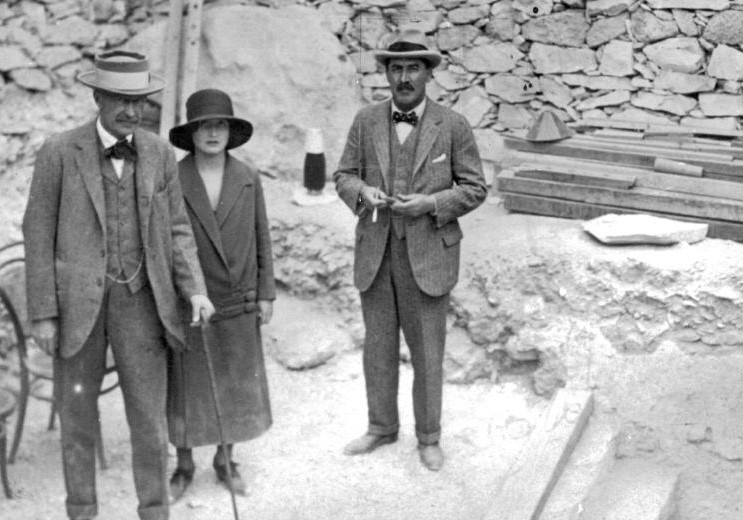
Lord Carnarvon, his daughter, Lady Evelyn Herbert, and Howard Carter at the top of the steps leading to the newly discovered tomb of Tutankhamun, November 1922.

In 1912 Carnarvon published Five Years' Exploration at Thebes, cowritten with Carter, describing their excavations.

In 1914, Carnarvon received the concession to dig in the Valley of the Kings, replacing Theodore Davis, who had resigned. Carter again led the work, undertaking a systematic search of the Valley for any tombs missed by previous expeditions, in particular that of the Pharaoh Tutankhamun. Excavations were interrupted during the First World War but resumed in late 1917. By 1922, little of significance had been found, and Carnarvon decided this would be the final year he would fund the work. However on 4 November 1922 Carter was able to send a telegram to Carnarvon in England, saying: "At last we have made wonderful discovery in Valley; a magnificent tomb with seals intact; re-covered same for your arrival; congratulations."

Carnarvon, accompanied by his daughter, Lady Evelyn Herbert, returned to Egypt, arriving at Luxor on 23 November 1922. Both were present the next day when the full extent of the stairway to the tomb was cleared and a seal containing Tutankhamun's cartouche found on the outer doorway. This door was removed and the rubble-filled corridor behind cleared, revealing the door of the tomb itself. Carnarvon was also present when, on 26 November, Carter made a tiny breach in the top left-hand corner of this doorway, enabling him to peer in by the light of a candle. When Carnarvon asked, "Can you see anything?" Carter replied, "Yes, wonderful things!" The tomb was then secured, to be entered in the presence of an official of the Egyptian Department of Antiquities the next day. However that night Carter, his assistant Arthur Callender, Carnarvon and Lady Evelyn apparently made an unauthorized visit, becoming the first people in modern times to enter the tomb. Some sources suggest that the group also entered the inner burial chamber. In this account, a small hole was found in the chamber's sealed doorway, and Carter, Carnarvon, and Lady Evelyn crawled through.

The next morning, 27 November, saw an inspection of the tomb in the presence of an Egyptian official. Callender rigged up electric lighting, illuminating a vast haul of items, including gilded couches, chests, thrones, and shrines. They also saw evidence of two further chambers, including the sealed doorway to the inner burial chamber, guarded by two life-size statues of Tutankhamun. Despite evidence of break-ins in ancient times, the tomb was virtually intact and would ultimately be found to contain more than 5,000 items.

On 29 November, the tomb was officially opened in the presence of several invited dignitaries and Egyptian officials.

Carnarvon traveled to England in December 1922, returning in January 1923 to be present at the official opening of the inner burial chamber on 16 February. Before the opening, Carnarvon had sold the exclusive newspaper rights to report the excavation to The Times. Whilst this helped finance the work, it created resentment both from other newspapers and from the Egyptian authorities, whose own press was also excluded.

Towards the end of February, a rift with Carter, probably caused by a disagreement on how to manage the supervising Egyptian authorities, temporarily closed the excavation. Work recommenced in early March after Carnarvon had apologized. This was to be Carnarvon's last significant involvement in the excavation project since he fell seriously ill shortly afterward.

== Death ==
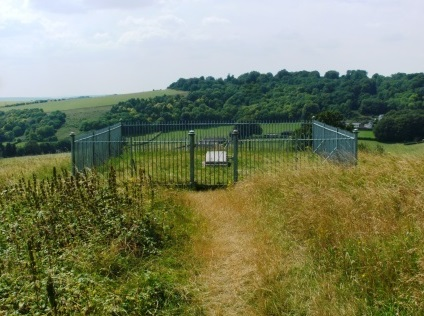
Lord Carnarvon's tomb on Beacon Hill

On 19 March 1923, Carnarvon suffered a severe mosquito bite, which became infected after a razor cut. On 5 April, he died in the Continental-Savoy Hotel in Cairo from, according to contemporary reports, blood poisoning progressing to pneumonia. On 14 April, Lady Almina Carnarvon moved Lord Carnarvon's remains to England. His tomb appropriately reflects his archaeological interest, being situated within an ancient hill fort on Beacon Hill overlooking his Highclere family seat.

After Lord Carnarvon's death, Carter continued the excavation. However, the Egyptian government took ownership of the contents of the tomb and in April 1930 provided a grant of £35,000 to his heirs (equivalent to £1.98 million in 2025).

=== Legends and speculations ===
Encouraged by newspaper speculation, the ‘Curse of Tutankhamun’, or the Mummy's Curse entered into popular culture and was fuelled further by the author Sir Arthur Conan Doyle's suggestion that Carnarvon's death had been caused by ‘elementals’ created by Tutankhamun's priests to guard the royal tomb. On 3 April 1923, just six weeks after Howard Carter had unsealed the burial chamber in the tomb of Tutankhamun, Conan Doyle arrived in New York to begin a four-month lecture tour on Spiritualism. Two days later he was asked by a reporter whether he connected the breaking news of Carnarvon’s death with the curse of the pharaohs. Conan Doyle responded to this question by drawing parallels between the death of Carnarvon and his late friend Bertram Fletcher Robinson, and his comments were reported in an article, which appeared in the Daily Express newspaper on 7 April 1923, as follows:

It is impossible to say with absolute certainty if this is true…If we had proper occult powers we could determine it, but I warned Mr Robinson against concerning himself with the mummy at the British Museum. He persisted, and his death occurred…I told him he was tempting fate by pursuing his enquiries...The immediate cause of death was typhoid fever, but that is the way in which the elementals guarding the mummy might act. They could have guided Mr Robinson into a series of such circumstances as would lead him to contract the disease, and thus cause his death - just as in Lord Carnarvon's case, human illness was the primary cause of death.

In 1998 it was argued in the Canadian Medical Association Journal that Conan Doyle may well have been right, owing to research (published in Proceedings of the Royal Society) by Sylvain Gandon, then of the Laboratoire d’Écologie in Paris, on the longevity and potency of toxic spores, as well as comments by archaeologist Nicholas Reeves on "reports of a black fungus inside the tomb". Howard Carter dismissed such speculation as 'tommy-rot', commenting that "the sentiment of the Egyptologist [...] is not one of fear, but of respect and awe [...] entirely opposed to foolish superstitions". Carter also asked a scientist he knew to test for possible pathogens on one of Tutankhamun's bandages, and the test reportedly found nothing. But modern testing of Egyptian mummies has found the presence of the toxic fungus Aspergillus flavus, whose spores also reportedly killed scientists after the opening of a 15th-century royal tomb in Poland in 1973, and Carnarvon (and other alleged victims such as George Jay Gould and Arthur Mace) showed symptoms that were at least arguably consistent with poisoning by its spores. The Aspergillus flavus speculation was revived in a 2022 documentary by Channel 4 that argued that its spores were a possible cause of Carnarvon's death (and possibly also of the deaths of Gould and Mace).

Some of the stories were clearly fabricated, including that a curse had been found inscribed on the wall of the tomb, while a study showed that those involved in the tomb's discovery and clearance did not have a lower than average life expectancy. In 2003, a letter in The Lancet's Correspondence section claimed that it was unlikely that Carnarvon's death had anything to do with Tutankhamun's tomb. The letter argues that although the earl was one of those to enter the tomb on several occasions, none of the other 25 from Europe was affected in the months after their entries.

The cause of Carnarvon's death was reported as ‘pneumonia supervening on [facial] erysipelas' (a streptococcal infection of the skin and underlying soft tissue). Pneumonia was thought to be only one of various complications arising from the progressively invasive infection that eventually resulted in multiorgan failure." The earl had been "prone to frequent and severe lung infections" according to the letter to The Lancet and there had been a "general belief ... that one acute attack of bronchitis could have killed him. In such a debilitated state, the earl's immune system was easily overwhelmed by erysipelas."

== In popular culture ==
- Carnarvon has been portrayed several times in film, video game, and television productions, with events portrayed with varying degrees of accuracy:
  - By Harry Andrews in the 1980 Columbia Pictures Television production The Curse of King Tut's Tomb.
  - By Julian Curry in the 1998 IMAX documentary Mysteries of Egypt.
  - By Julian Wadham in the 2005 BBC docudrama Egypt.
  - By Sam Neill in the 2016 ITV series Tutankhamun.
- In the film The Mummy the character Evelyn Carnahan is named in tribute to Lord Carnarvon's daughter, Lady Evelyn, whose father, although not named, is described as one of Egyptology's "finest patrons".
- 'Lord Carnarvon' is the quest leader for the Archaeologist role in the classic text-based computer game NetHack.
- His country house, Highclere Castle, serves as the exterior and upstairs filming location of the ITV/PBS television series Downton Abbey. The below-stairs scenes were filmed on a set in London, since Highclere's basement is the home of Carnarvon's Egyptian collection. Highclere is owned by the present earl.
- The animated TV series, Mummies Alive!, features a protagonist named “Presley Carnovan” as a tribute to Lord Carnarvon.

== Works ==
- Earl of Carnarvon; et al. (1912). Five years' explorations at Thebes: a record of work done 1907–1911. London: Henry Frowde.

Peerage of Great Britain
Preceded by Henry Herbert	Earl of Carnarvon; 1890–1923	Succeeded by Henry Herbert
