= Brograve Beauchamp =

British politician

Sir Brograve Campbell Beauchamp, 2nd Baronet (5 May 1897 – 25 August 1976) was a British businessman and National Liberal and Conservative Party politician.

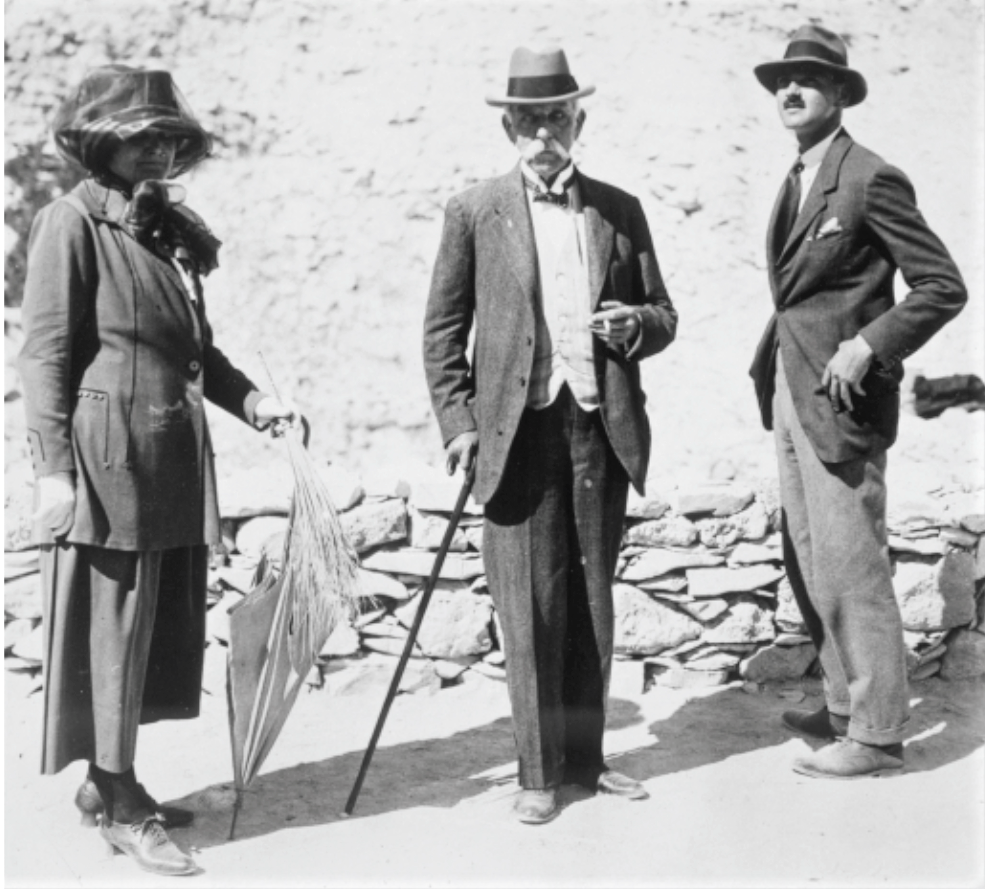
Brograve Beauchamp (right) and his parents visiting Tutankhamun's tomb in 1923

Beauchamp was the son of the Liberal politician and Lloyd's chairman Sir Edward Beauchamp, 1st Baronet, and his second wife Betty Campbell Beauchamp (née Woods), an American from Columbus, Ohio. Educated at Eton College, he served in the Life Guards during the First World War, but did not serve overseas. His elder brother, Edward Archibald Beauchamp, was killed in the war and Brograve therefore succeeded to the baronetcy on the death of his father in 1925. Sir Brograve died on 25 August 1976 at the age of 79, and the title became extinct.

== Political career ==
At the 1922 general election, Beauchamp stood as a National Liberal candidate for the Lowestoft division of Suffolk. His father had just stepped down as the constituency's MP, and Brograve hoped to win the seat, but lost heavily. He did not stand again until the 1931 general election, when he was elected as the Conservative Member of Parliament (MP) for Eastern division of Walthamstow. He was re-elected in 1935, and held the seat until he retired from Parliament at the 1945 general election. While in Parliament, he held a number of Parliamentary Private Secretary appointments, including in 1940 to Sir John Reith, Minister for Transport, and in 1942–43 to Richard Law, Parliamentary Under-Secretary of State for Foreign Affairs.

== Family ==
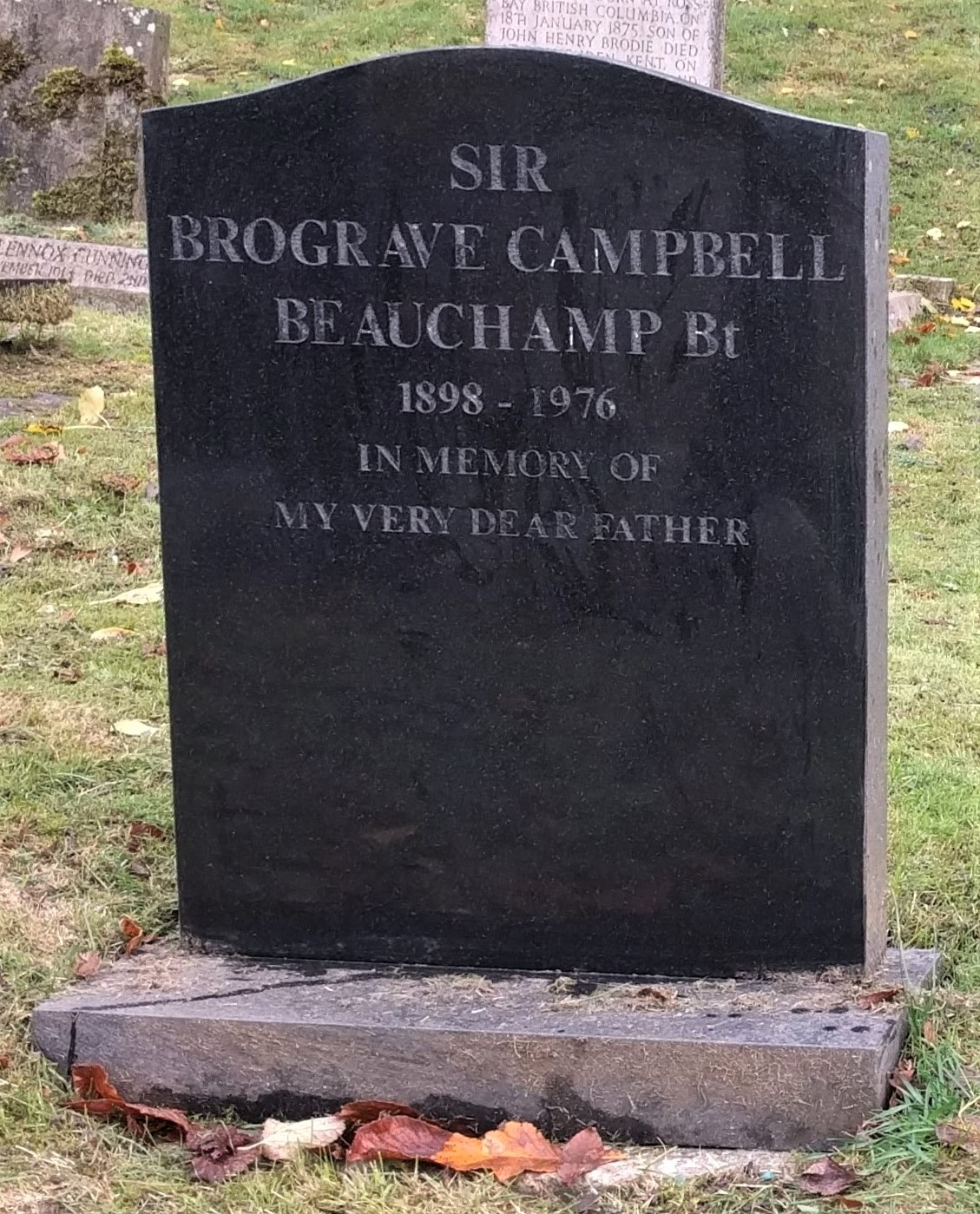
Beauchamp's grave in Putney Vale Cemetery (2019)

On 8 October 1923, Beauchamp married Lady Evelyn Leonora Almina Herbert, daughter of the 5th Earl of Carnarvon at St Margaret's Church, Westminster. They had one child, Patricia Evelyn Beauchamp (11 July 1925 – 7 October 2014). Sir Brograve and Lady Evelyn are buried beside each other in Putney Vale Cemetery in South West London.

In November 1922, before her marriage, Lady Evelyn and her father had been among the first people in modern times to enter the tomb of Tutankhamun in Egypt. In the spring of 1923 Brograve and his parents visited Egypt, and were given a guided tour of Tutankhamun's tomb by the archaeologist Howard Carter.

Outside Parliament Beauchamp worked as a businessman, and in 1937 he established a company named Pyrotenax, which produced a heat-resistant copper cable originally developed in France. During the Second World War the company's product was used extensively in military equipment. Pyrotenax floated on the stock exchange in 1954.

Parliament of the United Kingdom
Preceded by Harry Wallace	Member of Parliament for Walthamstow East; 1931 – 1945	Succeeded by Harry Wallace
Baronetage of the United Kingdom
Preceded by Edward Beauchamp	Baronet (of Grosvenor Place); 1925–1976	Extinct
