= Walthamstow East =

Parliamentary constituency in the United Kingdom, 1918–1974

- Former borough constituency for the House of Commons
- County: Essex

1918–1974
- Created from: Walthamstow
- Replaced by: Walthamstow and Chingford

Walthamstow East was a parliamentary constituency in what was then the Municipal Borough of Walthamstow in east London. It returned one Member of Parliament (MP) to the House of Commons of the Parliament of the United Kingdom, elected by the first-past-the-post voting system.

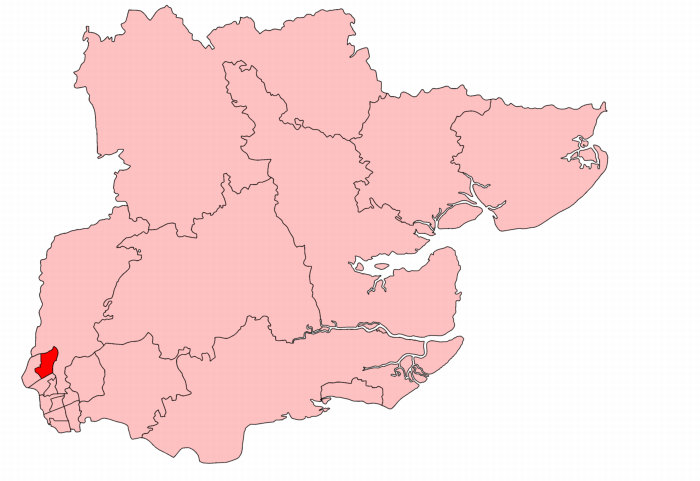
Walthamstow East in Essex, 1918-50

The constituency was created for the 1918 general election, and abolished for the February 1974 general election, when it was combined with part of the former Walthamstow West to form the new Walthamstow constituency. However, Hale End ward was added to the new Chingford constituency.

== Boundaries ==
1918–1950: The Urban District of Walthamstow wards of Hale End, Hoe Street, and Wood Street.

1950–1974: The Borough of Walthamstow wards of Hale End, Hoe Street, and Wood Street.

== Members of Parliament ==
Election	Member	Party
1918	Sir Stanley Johnson	Unionist
1924	Sir Hamar Greenwood	Constitutionalist
1924	Sir Hamar Greenwood	Conservative
1929	Harry Wallace	Labour
1931	Sir Brograve Beauchamp	Conservative
1945	Harry Wallace	Labour
1955	John Harvey	Conservative
1966	William Robinson	Labour
1969 by-election	Michael McNair-Wilson	Conservative
Feb 1974	constituency abolished: see Walthamstow	

== Elections ==
=== Elections in the 1910s ===
General election 1918: Walthamstow East
Party		Candidate	Votes	%
C	Unionist	Stanley Johnson	9,992	63.3
	Liberal	John Simon	5,781	36.7
Majority			4,211	26.6
Turnout			15,773	55.6
Registered electors			28,363	
	Unionist win (new seat)			
C indicates candidate endorsed by the coalition government.

=== Elections in the 1920s ===
General election 1922: Walthamstow East
Party	Candidate	Votes	%	±%
Unionist	Stanley Johnson	9,178	46.8	−16.5
Labour	William Bridgland Steer	6,382	32.6	New
Liberal	Henry Britten Brackenbury	4,043	20.6	−5.1
Majority		2,796	14.2	−12.4
Turnout		19,603	67.6	+12.0
Registered electors		29,013		
Unionist hold		Swing	-5.7	

General election 1923: Walthamstow East
Party	Candidate	Votes	%	±%
Unionist	Stanley Johnson	7,081	35.9	−10.9
Labour	John Gilbert Dale	6,837	34.6	+2.0
Liberal	Arthur Musgrove Mathews	5,837	29.5	+8.9
Majority		244	1.3	−12.9
Turnout		19,755	67.8	+0.2
Registered electors		29,151		
Unionist hold		Swing	-6.4	

General election 1924: Walthamstow East
Party	Candidate	Votes	%	±%
Constitutionalist (Unionist)	Hamar Greenwood	11,312	48.5	+12.6
Labour	John Gilbert Dale	8,246	35.4	+0.8
Liberal	Percy Holt Heffer	3,745	16.1	−13.4
Majority		3,066	13.1	N/A
Turnout		23,303	78.0	+11.2
Registered electors		29,861		
Constitutionalist gain from Unionist		Swing		

General election 1929: Walthamstow East
Party	Candidate	Votes	%	±%
Labour	Harry Wallace	11,039	39.6	+4.2
Unionist	James Hope	9,665	34.7	New
Liberal	Joseph Samuel Bridges	7,145	25.7	+9.6
Majority		1,374	4.9	N/A
Turnout		27,849	73.1	−4.9
Registered electors		38,102		
Labour gain from Constitutionalist		Swing	+9.0	

=== Elections in the 1930s ===
General election 1931: Walthamstow East
Party	Candidate	Votes	%	±%
Conservative	Brograve Beauchamp	18,815	58.8	+24.1
Labour	Harry Wallace	9,983	31.2	−8.4
Liberal	Albert Charles Crane	3,198	10.0	−15.7
Majority		8,832	27.6	N/A
Turnout		31,996	76.4	+3.3
Registered electors		41,890		
Conservative gain from Labour		Swing	+16.2	

General election 1935: Walthamstow East
Party	Candidate	Votes	%	±%
Conservative	Brograve Beauchamp	16,866	54.0	−4.8
Labour	Harry Wallace	14,378	46.0	+14.8
Majority		2,488	8.0	−19.6
Turnout		31,244	69.0	−7.4
Registered electors		42,258		
Conservative hold		Swing	-9.8	

=== Elections in the 1940s ===
General election 1945: Walthamstow East
Party	Candidate	Votes	%	±%
Labour	Harry Wallace	15,650	51.1	+5.1
Conservative	Herbert Eric Harrison	9,118	29.8	−24.2
Liberal	Norman Peter Dew	5,854	19.1	New
Majority		6,532	21.3	N/A
Turnout		30,622	73.5	+4.5
Registered electors		41,676		
Labour gain from Conservative		Swing	+14.6	

=== Elections in the 1950s ===
General election 1950: Walthamstow East
Party	Candidate	Votes	%	±%
Labour	Harry Wallace	18,478	46.97	−4.13
Conservative	DH Barber	15,206	38.65	+8.85
Liberal	Irving Frederick Drower	5,654	14.37	−4.73
Majority		3,272	8.32	−12.98
Turnout		39,338	84.41	+10.91
Registered electors		46,603		
Labour hold		Swing	-6.49	

General election 1951: Walthamstow East
Party	Candidate	Votes	%	±%
Labour	Harry Wallace	19,036	47.5	+0.6
Conservative	John Harvey	18,016	45.0	+6.3
Liberal	George E Thornton	2,815	7.03	―7.3
Independent	Bill Boaks	174	0.4	New
Majority		1,020	2.6	―5.8
Turnout		40,041	85.8	+1.4
Registered electors		46,683		
Labour hold		Swing	―2.9	

General election 1955: Walthamstow East
Party	Candidate	Votes	%	±%
Conservative	John Harvey	16,873	46.23	+1.2
Labour	Harry Wallace	15,744	43.14	―4.4
Liberal	Norman Henry Cork	3,882	10.6	+3.6
Majority		1,129	3.1	N/A
Turnout		36,499	80.81	―5.0
Registered electors		45,169		
Conservative gain from Labour		Swing	+2.8	

General election 1959: Walthamstow East
Party	Candidate	Votes	%	±%
Conservative	John Harvey	16,622	46.82	+0.6
Labour	Margaret McKay	13,721	38.65	―4.5
Liberal	Norman Henry Cork	4,974	14.0	+3.4
Ind. Labour Party	William Henry Christopher	183	0.5	New
Majority		2,901	8.2	+5.1
Turnout		35,500	80.9	+0.1
Registered electors		43,892		
Conservative hold		Swing	+2.5	

=== Elections in the 1960s ===
General election 1964: Walthamstow East
Party	Candidate	Votes	%	±%
Conservative	John Harvey	14,140	42.9	―3.9
Labour	William Robinson	13,745	41.7	+3.1
Liberal	John Ellis	5,042	15.3	+1.3
Majority		395	1.2	―7.0
Turnout		32,927	79.3	―1.6
Registered electors		41,504		
Conservative hold		Swing	―3.5	

General election 1966: Walthamstow East
Party	Candidate	Votes	%	±%
Labour	William Robinson	15,703	47.83	+6.1
Conservative	John Harvey	13,896	42.33	―0.6
Liberal	John Peter James Ellis	3,229	9.84	―5.5
Majority		1,807	5.50	N/A
Turnout		32,828	80.11	+0.8
Registered electors		41,504		
Labour gain from Conservative		Swing	+3.4	

By-election 1969: Walthamstow East
Party	Candidate	Votes	%	±%
Conservative	Michael McNair-Wilson	13,158	63.15	+20.82
Labour	Colin Phipps	7,679	36.85	―10.98
Majority		5,479	26.30	N/A
Turnout		20,837		
Conservative gain from Labour		Swing	+15.9	

=== Elections in the 1970s ===
General election 1970: Walthamstow East
Party	Candidate	Votes	%	±%
Conservative	Michael McNair-Wilson	14,260	46.7	+4.4
Labour	John Tomlinson	13,732	45.0	―2.8
Liberal	Duncan G. Kirkland	2,547	8.3	―1.5
Majority		528	1.7	N/A
Turnout		30,539	70.9	―9.2
Registered electors		43,099		
Conservative gain from Labour		Swing	+3.6	
