= Waveney District Council elections =

Local government elections in Suffolk, England

Local elections were held in Waveney district every four years to elect councillors to Waveney District Council. In the past, one-third of councillors were elected each year, but in 2010 the council opted to change to a whole council election system. Since the last boundary changes in 2002, 48 councillors have been elected from 23 wards. The district was merged with Suffolk Coastal in April 2019 to form East Suffolk, meaning that the 2015 elections were the final Waveney elections to be held.

== Political control ==
From the first election to the council in 1973 until its abolition in 2019, political control of the council was held by the following parties:

Party in control	Years
No overall control	1973–1976
Conservative	1976–1986
No overall control	1986–1990
Labour	1990–2002
No overall control	2002–2006
Conservative	2006–2011
No overall control	2011–2015
Conservative	2015–2019

=== Leadership ===
The leaders of the council from 2003 until its abolition in 2019 were:

Councillor	Party	From	To
Brian Hunter	Labour		May 2003
Peter Austin	Conservative	15 May 2003	13 June 2004
Mark Bee	Conservative	24 June 2004	25 May 2011
Colin Law	Conservative	25 May 2011	May 2017
Mark Bee	Conservative	17 May 2017	31 March 2019

== Council elections ==
Composition of the council
Year	Conservative	Labour	Liberal Democrats (Note: Includes totals for the predecessors of the Liberal Democrats, the Liberal Party and SDP (both of which participated in the Alliance).)	Green	Independents & Others	Council control after election
Local government reorganisation; council established (57 seats)
1973	22	27	5	–	3	No overall control
1976	39	13	4	0	1	Conservative
1979	32	17	3	0	5	Conservative
New ward boundaries (48 seats)
1983	27	17	2	0	2	Conservative
1984	26	19	2	0	1	Conservative
1986	23	21	3	0	1	No overall control
1987	22	21	4	0	1	No overall control
1988	23	20	4	0	1	No overall control
1990	16	27	4	0	1	Labour
1991	14	27	6	0	1	Labour
1992	17	26	5	0	0	Labour
1994	17	27	4	0	0	Labour
1995	10	36	2	0	0	Labour
1996	2	44	2	0	0	Labour
1998	3	41	2	0	2	Labour
1999	5	38	3	0	2	Labour
2000	13	28	4	0	3	Labour
New ward boundaries (48 seats)
2002	21	21	3	0	3	No overall control
2003	21	20	3	0	4	No overall control
2004	24	14	3	0	7	No overall control
2006	29	12	3	0	4	Conservative
2007	30	12	3	1	2	Conservative
2008	30	12	3	1	2	Conservative
2010	29	15	2	1		Conservative
New ward boundaries (48 seats)
2011	23	23	0	1	1	No overall control
2015	27	20	0	1	0	Conservative

== Results maps ==
1983 results map

1984 results map

1986 results map

1987 results map

1988 results map

1990 results map

1991 results map

1992 results map

1994 results map

1995 results map

1996 results map

1998 results map

1999 results map

2000 results map

2002 results map

2003 results map

2004 results map

2006 results map

2007 results map

2008 results map

2010 results map

2011 results map

2015 results map

== By-elections ==
=== 2002–2006 ===
Kessingland By-Election 26 February 2004
Party	Candidate	Votes	%	±%
Conservative		463	39.3	+3.1
Labour		417	35.4	−16.5
Liberal Democrats		297	25.2	+13.3
Majority		46	3.9	
Turnout		1,177		
Conservative gain from Labour		Swing		

=== 2011–2015 ===
Worlingham By-Election 19 December 2011
Party	Candidate	Votes	%	±%
Conservative	Norman Brooks	708	45.9	−7.1
Labour	Sylvia Robbins	586	38.0	+4.8
Green	Sue Bergin	137	8.9	−5.0
UKIP	Stuart Foulger	64	4.1	+4.1
Liberal Democrats	Doug Farmer	48	3.1	+3.1
Majority		122	7.9	
Turnout		1,543		
Conservative hold		Swing		

Beccles South By-Election 15 November 2012
Party	Candidate	Votes	%	±%
Conservative	Graham Catchpole	520	39.6	+12.3
Green	Nicky Elliott	390	29.7	+15.0
Labour	Alan Green	369	28.1	−5.3
Liberal Democrats	Doug Farmer	35	2.7	+2.7
Majority		130	9.9	
Turnout		1,314		
Conservative gain from Labour		Swing		

Harbour By-Election 2 May 2013
Party	Candidate	Votes	%	±%
Labour	Janet Craig	647	48.2	+2.5
UKIP	Bertie Poole	358	26.7	+26.7
Conservative	Anthony Taylor	217	16.2	−7.5
Green	George Langley	85	6.3	−7.8
Liberal Democrats	Christopher Thomas	36	2.7	+2.7
Majority		289	21.5	
Turnout		1,343		
Labour hold		Swing		

Oulton By-Election 8 August 2013
Party	Candidate	Votes	%	±%
Labour	Len Jacklin	449	41.2	+11.5
Conservative	Deanna Law	329	30.2	+2.2
UKIP	Bert Poole	269	24.7	+24.7
Green	Maxine Narburgh	23	2.1	−4.8
Liberal Democrats	Chris Thomas	21	1.9	−4.3
Majority		120	11.0	
Turnout		1,091		
Labour hold		Swing		

Halesworth By-Election 22 May 2014
Party	Candidate	Votes	%	±%
Conservative	Letitia Smith	726	42.2	−0.6
Labour	Tobias Walton	535	31.1	+3.7
Green	Jennifer Berry	245	14.3	−1.6
Independent	Jack Tyler	213	12.4	+12.4
Majority		191	11.1	
Turnout		1,719		
Conservative hold		Swing		

=== 2015–2019 ===
Wrentham By-Election 5 May 2016
Party	Candidate	Votes	%	±%
Conservative	Craig Rivett	335	40.4	−8.0
Labour	Paul Tyack	252	30.4	+11.6
UKIP	Andrew Bols	156	18.8	−4.3
Liberal Democrats	Chris Thomas	46	5.5	+5.5
Green	David Brambley-Crawshaw	40	4.8	−4.9
Majority		83	10.0	
Turnout		829		
Conservative hold		Swing		

Oulton Broad By-Election 21 September 2017
Party	Candidate	Votes	%	±%
Conservative	Keith Robinson	527	50.2	+8.8
Labour	Len Jacklin	357	34.0	+5.4
UKIP	Phillip Trindall	112	10.7	−11.1
Liberal Democrats	Chris Thomas	54	5.1	+5.1
Majority		170	16.2	
Turnout		1,050		
Conservative hold		Swing		

Kirkley By-Election 16 November 2017
Party	Candidate	Votes	%	±%
Labour	Peter Byatt	374	47.8	+12.2
Conservative	Gilly Gunner	217	27.7	+7.2
Liberal Democrats	Dominic Leslie	84	10.7	+10.7
UKIP	Phillip Trindall	78	10.0	−9.7
Green	Ben Quail	30	3.8	−5.2
Majority		157	20.1	
Turnout		783		
Labour hold		Swing		

St Margaret's By-Election 16 November 2017
Party	Candidate	Votes	%	±%
Conservative	Linda Coulam	487	41.7	+11.8
Labour	Nasima Begum	410	35.1	−1.3
UKIP	Bernie Guymer	119	10.2	−15.8
Liberal Democrats	Shaun Waters	88	7.5	+7.5
Green	Baz Bemment	65	5.6	−2.2
Majority		77	6.6	
Turnout		1,169		
Conservative gain from Labour		Swing		

Pakefield By-Election 12 July 2018
Party	Candidate	Votes	%	±%
Conservative	Melanie Vigo di Gallidoro	643	41.7	+11.8
Labour	Paul Tyack	600	40.9	−5.2
UKIP	Phillip Trindall	116	7.9	+7.9
Green	Peter Lang	64	4.4	−8.3
Liberal Democrats	Adam Robertson	44	3.0	−6.0
Majority		43	2.9	
Turnout		1,467		
Conservative gain from Labour		Swing		

Southwold and Reydon By-Election 12 July 2018
Party	Candidate	Votes	%	±%
Liberal Democrats	David Beavan	1,005	71.4	+71.4
Conservative	David Burrows	307	21.8	−28.4
Labour	John Cracknell	78	5.5	−14.8
UKIP	Mike Shaw	18	1.3	−13.3
Majority		698	49.6	
Turnout		1,408		
Liberal Democrats gain from Conservative		Swing		
