= Jess Asato =

British politician

Jess Asato MP
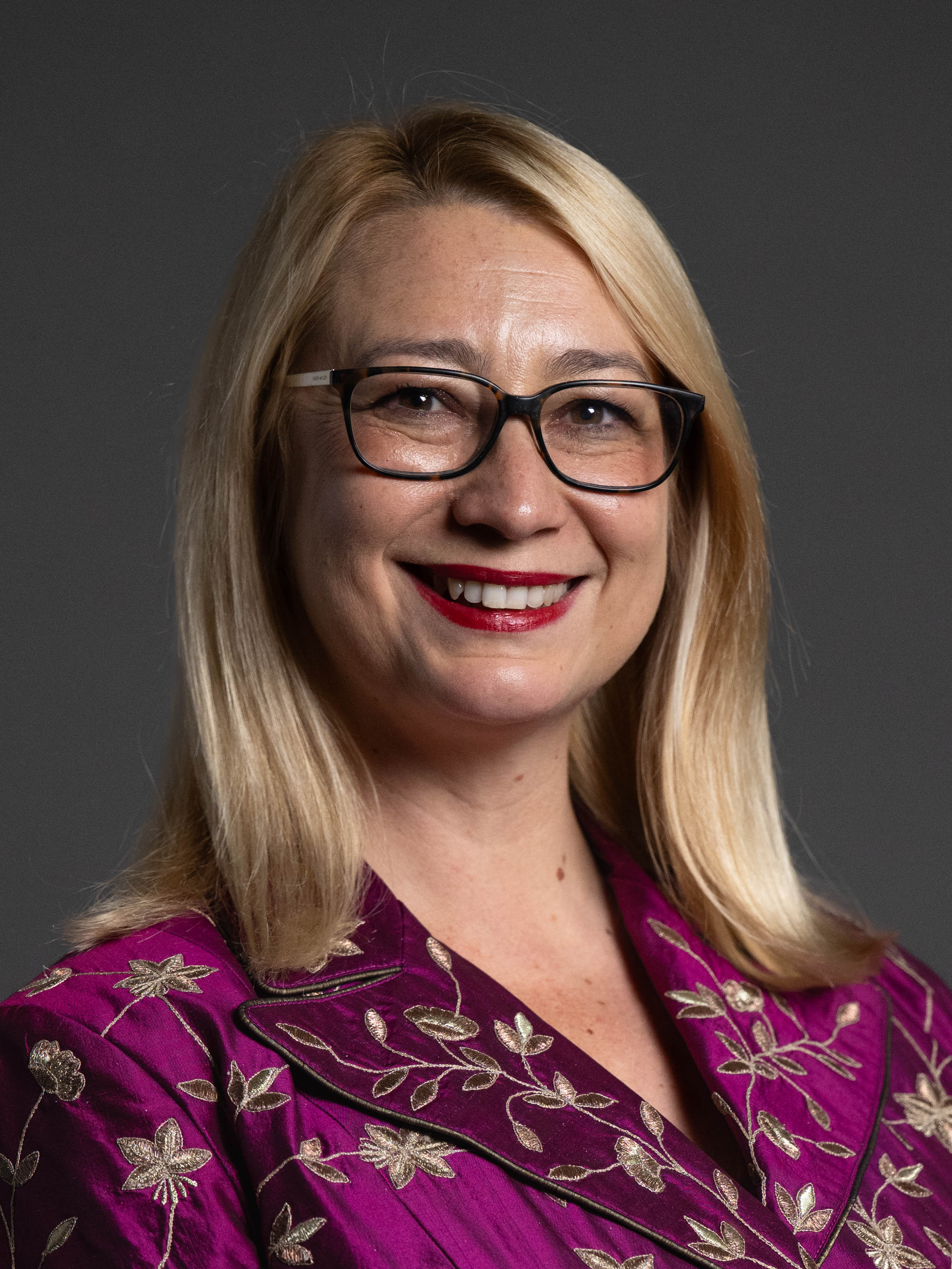
- Official portrait, 2025

Violence Against Women and Girls Adviser to the Department of Health and Social Care
- Incumbent
- Assumed office 2 December 2025
- Preceded by: Office Established

Member of Parliament for Lowestoft
- Incumbent
- Assumed office 4 July 2024
- Preceded by: Constituency re-established
- Majority: 2,016 (4.8%)

Islington Borough Councillor for St George's Ward
- In office 6 May 2010 – 4 February 2013
- Preceded by: Walter Burgess
- Succeeded by: Kat Fletcher

Personal details
- Born: 30 April 1981 (age 45) Palo Alto, California, U.S.
- Citizenship: British; American
- Party: Labour
- Education: Trinity Hall, Cambridge

Jessica Redmond-Withey Asato (born 30 April 1981) is an American-born British Labour Party politician who has been the Member of Parliament (MP) for Lowestoft since 2024. She was a member of Islington Borough Council from 2010 to 2013.

== Early life ==
Asato was born on 30 April 1981 in Palo Alto, California. She has mixed heritage with one of her grandparents being Japanese and having family in Hawaii. She grew up in the Gorleston-on-Sea area of Great Yarmouth and the nearby Norfolk village of Rollesby where she lived with and cared for her grandmother who had serious health problems.

Asato attended Flegg High School close to the village of Martham, to the north-west of Great Yarmouth. When she was 16 in 1997, she moved from Norfolk to live with her mother in London and went to Francis Holland School, an all-girls private school. She was a keen debater at Sixth Form level, reaching the semi-finals of the Oxford Union schools' debate competition. Asato studied at Trinity Hall, Cambridge, where she graduated with a degree in law.

== Political career ==
In 2009, as acting director of Progress, Asato was ranked No. 78 among the Top 100 most influential Left-wingers by The Daily Telegraph. In 2009, she wrote to the then Health Secretary Andy Burnham, raising concerns about his plans to make the NHS the "preferred provider" of NHS services. Asato was subsequently accused of hypocrisy for later supporting Clive Efford's anti-privatisation National Health Service (Amended Duties and Powers) Bill. In 2010, she was included a list of 10 young Labour names to watch in The Independent'.

She was a councillor on Islington London Borough Council from 2010 to 2013. She was criticised in Islington by political opponents for spending too much time in Norfolk, and for allegedly being a "professional politician". She worked in Westminster two days a week as political adviser to former cabinet minister and culture secretary Tessa Jowell, and was featured as one of the Evening Standard's Lucky 13 in 2013.

In Islington, she was chair of the Corporate Parenting Board. At the Labour Party Conference in 2014, she highlighted figures which she claimed showed there were 1,000 fewer childcare places in the East of England, that one in five parents had been forced to call in sick over the summer to look after their children and that child minder costs were up 44% in the last four years in the East of England.

Asato was selected in 2012 to be Labour's parliamentary candidate for the Norwich North constituency at the next general election. She resigned her council position in February 2013 to focus on her campaign. She was one of 15 Labour candidates each given financial support of £10,000 by Lord Oakeshott, the former Liberal Democrat, in January 2015. At the general election, Asato came second to Chloe Smith, having increased the Labour vote by 2% (Smith increased the Conservative vote by more than 3%).

On 24 February 2023, she was selected by local party members as the parliamentary candidate for Waveney at the 2024 general election. Due to the 2023 review of constituency boundaries across the UK, the Waveney constituency was abolished and the previous constituency that it replaced, Lowestoft, was re-established: the new Lowestoft constituency was made up of 44.9% of the geographical area of the old Waveney seat, and 91.4% of its population. Asato contested the Lowestoft constituency in the 2024 general election, defeating the previous Conservative MP for Waveney, Peter Aldous, with a margin of just over 2,000 votes.

While in Parliament, Asato successfully campaigned for amendments to the Crime and Policing Act 2026 which criminalised pornography depicting strangulation.

== Employment ==
She was employed as a health policy researcher at the Social Market Foundation and was director of the Labour Yes! Campaign in favour of alternative vote plus. She was previously acting director of Progress, a director of Left Foot Forward (2009–2015) and vice-chairman of the Fabian Society.

She was vice-chair of the Electoral Reform Society (2011–2015), having previously directed the Vote for a Change campaign for a referendum on electoral reform along with Neal Lawson and Colin Hines from 2009 to 2012. She was also chair of governors of Jack Taylor Special School for children with disabilities and learning difficulties, and served as joint acting chair of Brook. She is on the advisory board of the European Institute for the Study of Contemporary Antisemitism.

In 2025, she was appointed a director of the Social Market Foundation think tank.

== Legal case ==
In 2026 Asato sued Elon Musk's SpaceXAI, saying in a statement that the Grok AI platform had been used to create fake sexualised images of her. Law firm AWO said Asato had filed a claim at the High Court in England for breaches of data protection law and misuse of her private information. She is seeking remedies including damages, a formal acknowledgement that what happened to her was illegal and an order requiring xAI to stop all further illegality.

== Publications ==
- By Choice, Not Chance: Fabian Facts for Socialists (with Howard Dawber and Paul Richards), Fabian Society 2001 ISBN 0716340461
- Direct to Patient Communication: Patient Empowerment or NHS Burden? (editor), Social Market Foundation 2004 ISBN 1-904899-03-X
- Charging Ahead?: Spreading the Costs of Modern Public Services, Social Market Foundation, Oct 2007 ISBN 1904899412

Parliament of the United Kingdom
New constituency	Member of Parliament for Lowestoft; 2024–present	Incumbent
Party political offices
Preceded by Suresh Pushpananthan	Chair of the Fabian Society; 2012–2014	Succeeded by Seema Malhotra
Preceded by James Connal	Chair of the Young Fabians; 2002–2003	Succeeded by Kevin Bonavia
