= John Rentoul =

British journalist

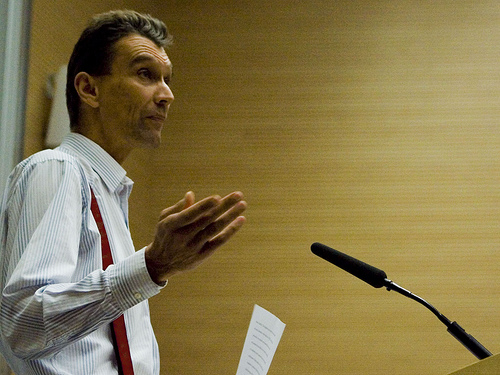
- Rentoul speaking in 2009 at QMUL
- Born: John Tindal Rentoul; India
- Education: King's College, Cambridge
- Occupation: Journalist
- Notable credit: The Independent
- Relatives: Gervais Rentoul

John Rentoul is a British journalist. He became the chief political commentator for The Independent newspaper in 2004.

== Early life ==
Rentoul was born in India, where his father was a minister of the Church of South India. Educated at Bristol Grammar School, then Wolverhampton Grammar School, Rentoul studied History and English at King's College, Cambridge, graduating in 1980, and worked on an oil rig before becoming a journalist on Accountancy Age. He is related to Sir Gervais Rentoul, the Conservative MP who was the founding chairman of the 1922 Committee.

== Career as political journalist ==
Rentoul was a journalist on the New Statesman between January 1983 and May 1988, latterly as Deputy Editor, and was a political reporter for the BBC's television programme On the Record between 1988 and 1995. In 1987, he published his book The Rich Get Richer: The Growth of Inequality in Britain in the 1980s.

He became a political correspondent of The Independent in 1995 and that newspaper's chief leader writer from January 1997, before becoming chief political commentator for The Independent on Sunday in 2004. His biography of Tony Blair has passed through several editions. Rentoul was visiting professor at Queen Mary University of London, until 2015, and is now visiting professor at King's College London.

Fellow journalist Martin Bright wrote in 2009 that Rentoul "remains one of the most incisive political columnists writing today, even though he has lost his access to the highest levels of power".

In 2011, Total Politics said that Rentoul "is probably the most high-profile defender of Tony Blair's record in the British media, in a year when the mere mention of the former PM's name provoked boos at the Labour Party conference. His column in The Independent on Sunday has become one of the last bastions of pure, unadulterated Blairism".

In November 2015, Rentoul issued a public apology for tweeting that "Jeremy Corbyn might say that France had brought the Paris attacks on itself". He acknowledged that it was a "stupid and offensive" thing to say.

Rentoul was critical of Ed Miliband's leadership of the Labour Party, and voted for Boris Johnson in the 2008 and 2012 London Mayoral elections.

In August 2021, Rentoul tweeted a public apology to Labour MP Jon Trickett. Rentoul had claimed that the MP's use of the slogan "Kill the Bill" implied support for the murder of police officers. In his apology, Rentoul acknowledged the slogan relates to opposition to the Police, Crime, Sentencing and Courts Bill and stated: "I accept that my tweet was wrong and I sincerely apologise for the distress and upset that my tweet has caused Mr Trickett."
