= David Porter (British politician) =

British politician

David John Porter (born 16 April 1948) is a British former Conservative Party member of parliament for the constituency of Waveney from 1987 to 1997.

Before going into Parliament he was co-founder and director of Vivid Children's Theatre, Head of Drama at Benjamin Britten High School in Lowestoft and Conservative Party Agent in Eltham, Norwich North and Waveney. Following the 1997 election, he gave some support to efforts supporting the British film industry. After his defeat, he returned to teaching, this time at Kirkley High School in Lowestoft (now East Point Academy), where he became Head of Performing Arts. After he left teaching in 2011, he continued working as a senior examiner in performing arts and English and writer of exam and teaching materials.

In December 2015, he self-published a novel, Old Men's Dreams, on Amazon. In early 2018, he self-published a collection of short stories, Wild Beasts and Plague, which in turn was followed by a second anthology of short stories, Scoffers Will Come (2019) and a further novel, Detestable Things (2020). He also published his autobiography, A Rebel's Journey, for private circulation only.

All his publications are under his Walk in My Shoes imprint, with the logo of a pair of surgical boots he has to wear on account of his Charcot Marie Tooth condition, which has deformed his feet.

During his time in Parliament, some said that he never managed to completely step out of the shadow of his predecessor, the Conservative Cabinet Minister from Lowestoft, Jim Prior.

Porter had an in-depth knowledge of the fishing industry and sea defences and was considered by some opponents to be a near single-issue politician and a rebel, while frequently focusing on local issues, including rural affairs, housing, education, health, social security and consumer affairs and citizenship, for example.

On two occasions he was threatened with suspension, but was never actually suspended from the Conservative whip. He rebelled against the Government on the Maastricht Treaty and several fishing motions that he regarded as damaging to Lowestoft. The European Common Fisheries Policy he argued resulted in unfair national allocations of fish stocks and the discard policy of throwing dead fish back into the sea was preposterous, damaging the fishing industry in the longer term. Although some in the Conservative Party tried to select a different candidate after his selection in 1985, at the time the local Conservative Associations had total power of selection and retained Porter. He regularly campaigned for Britain to leave the European Common Fisheries Policy, preferring a system of local control with a yearly 'Sabbath' (ban of fishing) rotating through each sea area around the United Kingdom waters.

He served on Social Security, Employment and Education Select Committees during his decade in the Commons.

Although he always remained popular locally, he lost his seat in the 1997 Labour landslide to Bob Blizzard, a local councillor who in turn lost the seat back to the Conservatives in 2010, when Peter Aldous became MP.

Parliament of the United Kingdom
Preceded by Jim Prior	Member of Parliament for Waveney; 1987 – 1997	Succeeded by Bob Blizzard
