= Lowestoft (constituency) =

UK Parliament constituency (1885–1983, 2024 onwards)

Coordinates: 52.47°N 1.71°E

- County constituency for the House of Commons
- Interactive map of boundaries since 2024
- Location within the East of England
- County: Suffolk
- Electorate: 73,967 (March 2020)
- Major settlements: Lowestoft, Beccles

Current constituency
- Created: 2024
- Member of Parliament: Jess Asato (Labour)
- Seats: One
- Created from: Waveney

1885–1983
- Seats: One
- Created from: East Suffolk
- Replaced by: Waveney and Great Yarmouth

Lowestoft (LOH-(ih)-stoft, LOH-stəf) is a parliamentary constituency centred on the town of Lowestoft in Suffolk. It returns one Member of Parliament (MP) to the House of Commons of the Parliament of the United Kingdom, elected by the first past the post voting system. It has been represented since 2024 by Jess Asato of the Labour Party.

The constituency was originally created for the 1885 general election, and abolished for the 1983 general election when it was succeeded by the constituency of Waveney. Waveney was abolished in the 2023 review of Westminster constituencies, and Lowestoft re-established for the 2024 general election.

== Constituency profile ==
Lowestoft is a constituency located in Suffolk. It is centred on the large town of Lowestoft, the United Kingdom's most easterly settlement, which has a population of around 72,000. The constituency also includes the nearby small market town of Beccles and the villages of Worlingham and Kessingland. Lowestoft was traditionally reliant on the fishing and tourism industries but is now an important centre for the energy sector, with North Sea oil, gas and offshore wind farms providing employment for the town. Like many towns on England's east coast, Lowestoft is highly-deprived, with most of it falling within the top 10% most-deprived areas in the country. Beccles and the constituency's villages have average levels of wealth. House prices are considerably lower than the East of England and nationwide averages.

Lowestoft has a large retiree population and its residents generally have low levels of education and household income. Few residents work in professional occupations and a high proportion work in the retail, manufacturing and service sectors. The percentage of residents claiming unemployment benefits is higher than average, and the constituency's child poverty rate is high. White people made up 97% of the population at the 2021 census. Most of the constituency is represented by Conservatives at the local council level, with some Labour Party councillors elected in Lowestoft town centre and Green Party representatives elected in Beccles. Voters in Lowestoft strongly supported leaving the European Union in the 2016 referendum; an estimated 64% voted in favour of Brexit compared to the nationwide figure of 52%.

== History ==
The "Northern or Lowestoft Division" was one of five single-member county divisions of the Parliamentary County of Suffolk created by the Redistribution of Seats Act 1885 to replace the existing two 2-member divisions for the 1885 general election. It was formed from parts of the Eastern Division of Suffolk. It became a county constituency from the 1950 general election and was abolished for the 1983 general election, being replaced by the county constituency of Waveney.

It was more often won by the Conservative Party than not, although its representatives include two from the Liberal Party and one from the Labour Party.

== Boundaries and boundary changes ==
=== Historic ===
==== 1885–1918 ====
- The Borough of Southwold;
- The Sessional Divisions of Beccles, Bungay, Lothingland, and Mutford;
- Part of the Sessional Division of Blything; and
- The part of the Borough of Great Yarmouth in the county of Suffolk.

As Great Yarmouth formed a separate Parliamentary Borough, only non-resident freeholders of the Borough were entitled to vote in this constituency.

The constituency established in 1885, which was formally named "The Northern or Lowestoft Division of Suffolk" (and was sometimes referred to simply as "Suffolk North"), also included the town of Halesworth and the rural areas in between.

Throughout its first existence, the Lowestoft constituency covered the North-Eastern corner of Suffolk and, although encompassing some rural areas, drew the majority of its voters from the towns of Lowestoft, a resort and fishing port, and Beccles; it also included the smaller towns of Bungay and Southwold, with its brewing interests. Southwold is now in the Suffolk Coastal constituency.

==== 1918–1950 ====
- The Boroughs of Beccles, Lowestoft, and Southwold;
- The Urban Districts of Bungay and Oulton Broad;
- The Rural Districts of Mutford and Lothingland, and Wangford; and
- The Rural District of Blything parishes of Benacre, Covehithe, Easton Bavents, Frostenden, Henstead, Reydon, South Cove, and Wrentham.

In the boundary changes of 1918, Halesworth was transferred to the neighbouring Eye division. The constituency became simply the "Lowestoft Division of East Suffolk" or East Suffolk, Lowestoft.

==== 1950–1983 ====
- The Boroughs of Beccles, Lowestoft, and Southwold;
- The Urban Districts of Bungay and Halesworth; and
- The Rural Districts of Lothingland and Wainford.

At the 1950 general election, Halesworth was once more placed in the revised Lowestoft County Constituency, but it otherwise underwent only minor changes to reflect local government rationalisations. The boundaries were not altered in the boundary review implemented in 1974.

The constituency was revised in 1983 and renamed Waveney, as its new boundaries were now identical with those of the local government district of that name. The new constituency was very similar to the old Lowestoft one except a small area in the north, including Bradwell (comprising about 10,000 voters), which had been transferred from Suffolk to Norfolk as a result of the Local Government Act 1972, and was now transferred to the county constituency of Great Yarmouth.

=== Current ===
The re-established constituency, which came into effect for the 2024 general election, is composed of the following wards of the District of East Suffolk (as they existed on 1 December 2020):

- Beccles & Worlingham; Carlton & Whitton; Carlton Colville; Gunton & St. Margarets; Harbour & Normanston; Kessingland; Kirkley & Pakefield; Lothingland; Oulton Broad.

The bulk of the existing Waveney seat, including Lowestoft, Somerleyton and Beccles, was included in the re-established seat, whereas Bungay and The Saints were transferred to the newly created constituency of Waveney Valley.

== Members of Parliament ==
=== MPs 1885–1983 ===
East Suffolk prior to 1885

Election	Member	Party	Notes
1885	Sir Savile Crossley	Liberal	
1886	Sir Savile Crossley	Liberal Unionist	
1892	Harry Foster	Conservative	
1900	Francis Lucas	Conservative	
1906	Edward Beauchamp	Liberal	
Jan 1910	Harry Foster	Conservative	
Dec 1910	Edward Beauchamp	Liberal	
1916	Edward Beauchamp	Coalition Liberal	
Jan 1922	Edward Beauchamp	National Liberal	
1922	Gervais Rentoul	Conservative	Chairman of the 1922 Committee (1923–1932)
1934 by-election	Pierse Loftus	Conservative	
1945	Edward Evans	Labour	
1959	Jim Prior	Conservative	Minister of Agriculture, Fisheries and Food (1970–1972); Leader of the House of Commons (1972–1974); Secretary of State for Employment (1979–1981); Secretary of State for Northern Ireland (1981–1984); Contested Waveney following redistribution
1983	Constituency abolished, became Waveney		

=== MPs since 2024 ===
Waveney prior to 2024

Election	Member	Party
2024	Jess Asato	Labour

== Elections ==
=== Elections in the 2020s ===
General election 2024: Lowestoft
Party	Candidate	Votes	%	±%
Labour	Jess Asato	14,464	34.6	+6.4
Conservative	Peter Aldous*	12,448	29.8	−31.1
Reform	June Mummery	10,328	24.7	N/A
Green	Toby Hammond	3,095	7.4	+2.2
Liberal Democrats	Adam Robertson	1,489	3.6	−1.5
Majority		2,016	4.8	N/A
Turnout		41,824	56.3	–5.1
Registered electors		74,332		
Labour gain from Conservative		Swing	▲18.8	

* Incumbent MP for Waveney

=== Elections in the 2010s ===
2019 notional result
Party	Vote	%
Conservative	27,648	60.9
Labour	12,798	28.2
Green	2,362	5.2
Liberal Democrats	2,333	5.1
Others	245	0.5
Turnout	45,386	61.4
Electorate	73,967	

=== Election results 1885–1918 ===
==== Elections in the 1880s ====
General election 1885: Lowestoft
Party	Candidate	Votes	%
Liberal	Savile Crossley	4,324	53.6
Conservative	Heneage Bagot-Chester	3,743	46.4
Majority		581	7.2
Turnout		8,067	73.6
Registered electors		10,956	
Liberal win (new seat)			

General election 1886: Lowestoft
Party	Candidate	Votes	%	±%
Liberal Unionist	Savile Crossley	Unopposed		
Liberal Unionist gain from Liberal				

==== Elections in the 1890s ====
General election 1892: Lowestoft
Party	Candidate	Votes	%	±%
Conservative	Harry Foster	5,099	56.6	N/A
Liberal	James Judd	3,909	43.4	New
Majority		1,190	13.2	N/A
Turnout		9,008	76.2	N/A
Registered electors		11,827		
Conservative hold		Swing	N/A	

General election 1895: Lowestoft
Party	Candidate	Votes	%	±%
Conservative	Harry Foster	5,199	57.6	+1.0
Liberal	Alfred Sington	3,820	42.4	−1.0
Majority		1,379	15.2	+2.0
Turnout		9,019	74.2	−2.0
Registered electors		12,153		
Conservative hold		Swing	+1.0	

==== Elections in the 1900s ====
General election 1900: Lowestoft
Party	Candidate	Votes	%	±%
Conservative	Francis Lucas	5,077	60.3	+2.7
Liberal	Adam Adams	3,348	39.7	−2.7
Majority		1,729	20.6	+5.4
Turnout		8,425	66.5	−7.7
Registered electors		12,678		
Conservative hold		Swing	+2.7	

Edward Beauchamp

General election 1906: Lowestoft
Party	Candidate	Votes	%	±%
Liberal	Edward Beauchamp	6,510	57.0	+17.3
Conservative	Francis Lucas	4,905	43.0	−17.3
Majority		1,605	14.0	N/A
Turnout		11,415	81.5	+15.0
Registered electors		14,002		
Liberal gain from Conservative		Swing	+17.3	

==== Elections in the 1910s ====
General election January 1910: Lowestoft
Party	Candidate	Votes	%	±%
Conservative	Harry Foster	6,530	50.9	+7.9
Liberal	Edward Beauchamp	6,294	49.1	−7.9
Majority		236	1.8	N/A
Turnout		12,824	85.0	+3.5
Registered electors		15,084		
Conservative gain from Liberal		Swing	+7.9	

General election December 1910: Lowestoft
Party	Candidate	Votes	%	±%
Liberal	Edward Beauchamp	6,248	51.1	+2.0
Conservative	Harry Foster	5,983	48.9	−2.0
Majority		265	2.2	N/A
Turnout		12,231	81.1	−3.9
Registered electors		15,084		
Liberal gain from Conservative		Swing	+2.0	

General Election 1914–15:

Another General Election was required to take place before the end of 1915. The political parties had been making preparations for an election to take place and by July 1914, the following candidates had been selected;

- Liberal: Edward Beauchamp
- Unionist:

=== Election results 1918–1950 ===
==== Elections in the 1910s ====
General election 1918: Lowestoft
Party		Candidate	Votes	%
C	National Liberal	Edward Beauchamp	Unopposed	
Registered electors				
	National Liberal win (new boundaries)			
C indicates candidate endorsed by the coalition government.

==== Elections in the 1920s ====
General election 1922: Lowestoft
Party	Candidate	Votes	%	±%
Unionist	Gervais Rentoul	14,154	57.0	New
National Liberal	Brograve Beauchamp	6,205	24.9	N/A
Labour	Robert Arthur Mellanby	4,511	18.1	New
Majority		7,949	32.1	N/A
Turnout		24,870	71.0	N/A
Registered electors		35,012		
Unionist gain from National Liberal		Swing	N/A	

General election 1923: Lowestoft
Party	Candidate	Votes	%	±%
Unionist	Gervais Rentoul	11,103	45.8	−11.2
Liberal	Frederick Paterson	8,362	34.5	+9.6
Labour	Robert Arthur Mellanby	4,788	19.7	+1.6
Majority		2,741	11.3	−19.8
Turnout		24,253	67.6	−3.4
Registered electors		35,881		
Unionist hold		Swing	−10.4	

General election 1924: Lowestoft
Party	Candidate	Votes	%	±%
Unionist	Gervais Rentoul	13,422	50.6	+4.8
Labour	Robert Arthur Mellanby	6,570	24.8	+5.1
Liberal	Frederick Paterson	6,532	24.6	−9.9
Majority		6,852	25.8	+14.5
Turnout		26,524	73.0	+5.4
Registered electors		36,321		
Unionist hold		Swing	−0.2	

General election 1929: Lowestoft
Party	Candidate	Votes	%	±%
Unionist	Gervais Rentoul	13,624	39.8	−10.8
Liberal	Albert Edward Owen-Jones	10,707	31.3	+6.7
Labour	Basil Hall	9,903	28.9	+4.1
Majority		2,917	8.5	−17.3
Turnout		34,234	84.8	+11.8
Registered electors		46,359		
Unionist hold		Swing	−8.8	

==== Elections in the 1930s ====
General election 1931: Lowestoft
Party	Candidate	Votes	%	±%
Conservative	Gervais Rentoul	22,886	67.8	+28.0
Labour	E. J. C. Neep	10,894	32.2	+3.3
Majority		11,992	35.6	+27.1
Turnout		33,780		
Conservative hold		Swing		

1934 Lowestoft by-election
Party	Candidate	Votes	%	±%
Conservative	Pierse Loftus	15,912	47.9	−19.9
Labour	Reginald Sorensen	13,992	42.1	+9.8
Liberal	William Smith	3,304	10.0	New
Majority		1,920	5.8	−29.8
Turnout		33,208	67.9	
Conservative hold		Swing	−14.9	

General election 1935: Lowestoft
Party	Candidate	Votes	%	±%
Conservative	Pierse Loftus	21,064	61.21	
Labour	Frederick Wise	13,348	38.79	
Majority		7,716	22.42	
Turnout		34,412	69.00	
Conservative hold		Swing		

General Election 1939–40: Another General Election was required to take place before the end of 1940. The political parties had been making preparations for an election to take place from 1939 and by the end of this year, the following candidates had been selected;

- Conservative: Pierse Loftus
- Labour: A D Belden
- Liberal:

==== Elections in the 1940s ====
General election 1945: Lowestoft
Party	Candidate	Votes	%	±%
Labour	Edward Evans	12,759	42.1	+3.3
Conservative	Pierse Loftus	10,996	36.3	−24.9
Liberal	Matthew P Crosse	6,545	21.6	New
Majority		1,763	5.8	N/A
Turnout		30,300	67.8	−1.2
Labour gain from Conservative		Swing		

=== Election results 1950–1983 ===
==== Elections in the 1950s ====
General election 1950: Lowestoft
Party	Candidate	Votes	%	±%
Labour	Edward Evans	20,838	44.83	
Conservative	Philip Geoffrey Whitefoord	17,516	37.68	
Liberal	Ruth Crisp English	8,132	17.49	
Majority		3,322	7.15	
Turnout		46,486	83.83	
Labour hold		Swing		

General election 1951: Lowestoft
Party	Candidate	Votes	%	±%
Labour	Edward Evans	23,591	50.91	
Conservative	Alfred Henry Willetts	22,744	49.09	
Majority		847	1.82	
Turnout		46,335	81.89	
Labour hold		Swing		

General election 1955: Lowestoft
Party	Candidate	Votes	%	±%
Labour	Edward Evans	23,587	52.12	
Conservative	J T Griffiths	21,672	47.88	
Majority		1,915	4.24	
Turnout		45,259	79.61	
Labour hold		Swing		

General election 1959: Lowestoft
Party	Candidate	Votes	%	±%
Conservative	James Prior	24,324	51.58	
Labour	Edward Evans	22,835	48.42	
Majority		1,489	3.16	N/A
Turnout		47,159	64.4	−15.2
Conservative gain from Labour		Swing	−3.1	

==== Elections in the 1960s ====
General election 1964: Lowestoft
Party	Candidate	Votes	%	±%
Conservative	Jim Prior	23,976	47.80	
Labour	Ronald Atkins	21,272	42.41	
Liberal	Charles Gordon A. Steele	4,911	9.79	
Majority		2,704	5.39	
Turnout		50,159	82.53	
Conservative hold		Swing		

General election 1966: Lowestoft
Party	Candidate	Votes	%	±%
Conservative	Jim Prior	24,063	46.03	
Labour	Michael D Cornish	23,705	45.34	
Liberal	David R Crome	4,513	8.63	
Majority		358	0.69	
Turnout		52,281	83.14	
Conservative hold		Swing		

==== Elections in the 1970s ====
General election 1970: Lowestoft
Party	Candidate	Votes	%	±%
Conservative	Jim Prior	28,842	50.69	
Labour	Douglas A Baker	23,319	40.98	
Liberal	David R Crome	4,737	8.33	
Majority		5,523	9.71	
Turnout		56,898	78.68	
Conservative hold		Swing		

General election February 1974: Lowestoft
Party	Candidate	Votes	%	±%
Conservative	Jim Prior	26,157	40.89	
Labour	Douglas A Baker	22,553	35.26	
Liberal	P Hancock	15,261	23.86	
Majority		3,604	5.63	
Turnout		63,971	83.79	
Conservative hold		Swing		

General election October 1974: Lowestoft
Party	Candidate	Votes	%	±%
Conservative	Jim Prior	25,510	42.43	
Labour	Douglas A Baker	23,448	39.00	
Liberal	P Hancock	11,165	18.57	
Majority		2,062	3.43	
Turnout		60,123	78.15	
Conservative hold		Swing		

General election 1979: Lowestoft
Party	Candidate	Votes	%	±%
Conservative	Jim Prior	33,376	50.46	
Labour	Alan Lark	25,555	38.63	
Liberal	Barrie Skelcher	6,783	10.25	
Ecology	T Pye	435	0.66	New
Majority		7,821	11.83	
Turnout		66,149	79.95	
Conservative hold		Swing		

== See also ==
- List of parliamentary constituencies in Suffolk
- List of parliamentary constituencies in the East of England (region)
