= NCUB =

NCUB may refer to:

- National Centre for Universities and Business, an organisation in the United Kingdom
- National Council of the Union of Burma, an opposition organisation in Myanmar (Burma)
