= David Docherty =

British writer

David Docherty OBE is a British writer, journalist, academic, television executive and producer and former CEO of the National Centre for Universities and Business. He writes both fiction and non-fiction, the former falling into the thrillers genre and the latter being academic books relating to the media. He has also produced two plays for children.

== Career ==
Educated at the University of Strathclyde and the London School of Economics, Docherty has had a lengthy career in the British media. During his career in television his credits have included serving as BBC Deputy Director of Television and Director of New Media with the corporation, as well as being a member of the BBC's Board of Management and a director of the Royal Television Society. In addition he has also been managing director of Broadband at Telewest, chief executive of the interactive television company YooPublic and chairman of the board of Governors at the University of Luton. More recently, he was CEO of CSC Media Group and Chairman of Internet-TV company, IPVision.

In June 2009 Docherty took over as chief executive of the Council for Industry and Higher Education. He led the organisation's rebranding as The National Centre for Universities and Business (NCUB) in 2013. He was also Chairman of the Digital TV Group.

As an author he has written several works of fiction and non-fiction. His non-fiction books are usually concerned with the media and include Running the Show: 21 years of London Weekend Television, published in 1990 and Violence in Television Fiction (published in 1991). His novels include The Spirit Death (2000) and The Killing Jar (2002). The Spirit Death was optioned for ITV. As a journalist he has written articles for The Guardian, The Listener and The Times.

== Bibliography ==
=== Fiction ===
- The Spirit Death (2000)
- The Killing Jar (2002)
- The Fifth Season (2003)

=== Non-fiction ===
- The Last Picture Show? Britain's Changing Film Audience (1987)
- Keeping Faith? Channel 4 and Its Audience (1988)
- Running The Show: 21 Years of London Weekend Television (1990)
- Violence in Television Fiction
- Growing Value: Business-University Collaboration for the 21st Century (2014)

== Notes ==
General

- Baker, Martin (22 May 2005). "Business profile: The last dotcom evangelist". Telegraph.co.uk.

Specific
