= Graham Salmon =

British athlete

Medal record

Athletics (B1)

Representing United Kingdom

Paralympic Games
Bronze medal – third place	1984 Stoke Mandeville / New York	400m

Graham Henry Salmon, MBE (5 September 1954 – October 1999) was a blind British athlete. He set the world record for 100m by a blind man at the 1984 Summer Paralympics and won a bronze medal in the B1 400 metres. He competed at both the Summer Paralympic Games and the Winter Paralympic Games.

== Early life ==
Diagnosed with a tumour in his right eye at the age of three days, Salmon had to have an operation to remove it. When an identical tumour was discovered in his left eye some weeks later, he underwent radiotherapy to have it repaired. The eye didn't stand up to the treatment, and he was left completely blind.

Salmon was educated at Linden Lodge School where he gained O levels in History and English Language and Literature. He subsequently attended Worcester College.

Apart from being left blind, Salmon was able to live a relatively normal life. He gained support from the RNIB and managed to get a full qualification in computer programming. Whilst his disability limited his career prospects, he was employed by Abbey National Building Society for a considerable number of years before his health failed.

== Career ==
By 1982 Salmon had become a good athlete, and had met the playwright Mark Wheeller. He features as the central character in Wheeller's stage production Race to be Seen

He was awarded the MBE in the 1989 New Year Honours.

=== Winter Paralympics ===
Salmon made his Paralympic Games début when he represented Britain at the 1976 Winter Paralympics in Örnsköldsvik, Sweden. Entering in cross-country skiing, he competed in the short distance 10 km (category A), finishing 23rd (out of 28) with a real time of 1:10:58, and the middle distance 15 km (category A), finishing 23rd (out of 25) with a real time of 1:46:19.

He did not compete again at the Winter Games.

=== Summer Paralympics ===
Salmon's first participation in the Summer Paralympics came when he represented Britain at the 1980 Summer Paralympics in Arnhem, Netherlands. He competed in two events:

- the 60m sprint (category A), where he finished 4th (out of 42) with a time of 7.86 - one-hundredth of a second behind the bronze medal time.
- the high jump (category A), where he finished 8th (out of 20) with a jump of 1.25m.

Salmon participated for the third and last time in the Paralympic Games when he represented Britain at the 1984 Summer Paralympics in Stoke Mandeville and New York. He competed in just one event, the 400m (B1 category). He won the first heat comfortably with a time of 56.45, advancing to the semi-final, where he finished second with a time of 55.32. He ran with a time of 55.45 in the final, obtaining the bronze medal.
