= Edward Evans (British politician) =

British teacher and politician (1883–1960)

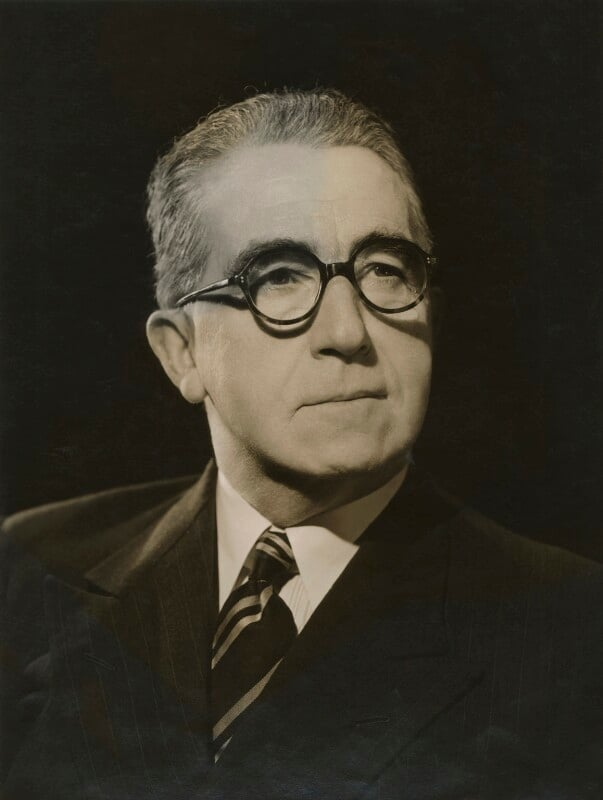
Evans, c. 1945

Edward Evans CBE (11 January 1883 – 30 March 1960) was a teacher and Labour Party politician in the United Kingdom. Noted for his work for and with deaf people and the blind, he entered the House of Commons in his sixties, and sat from 1945 to 1959.

== Early life ==
Evans was born in Manchester to Welsh parents. He was educated at Llanelli Science Schools and at St Paul's College in Cheltenham, before training as a teacher at the University of London. He taught first at an elementary school in London, then successively at Linden Lodge Special School for the Blind, the Old Kent Road School for the Deaf and the East Anglian Schools for Blind and Deaf in Gorleston, Norfolk. He held special diplomas in the teaching of blind and of deaf people, and retired as the headmaster of Gorleston in 1943, having been a teacher for 40 years, and served for the next two years as Secretary of the National Institute for the Blind.

A sometime member of Great Yarmouth Borough Council and its education committee, he was elected at the 1945 general election as the member of parliament (MP) for Lowestoft in Suffolk. The Times newspaper had predicted that the sitting Conservative Party MP Pierse Loftus as "likely to be re-elected", but 62-year-old Evans had overturned a majority of 22% to become Lowestoft's first Labour MP. He was made a Commander of the Order of the British Empire (CBE) "for political and public services" in the King's Birthday Honours List 1949, and represented Lowestoft in the House of Commons for 14 years, until his defeat at the 1959 general election by the Conservative James Prior.

In the Commons, he was noted for his contributions relating to coastal erosion in East Anglia, chairing the All Party Coast Defence Committee, and on fishery protection, frequently complaining of violations by other nations of the Overfishing Convention. He was Chairman of the Labour Party's Fisheries Committee.

In Parliament and out, Evans was an activist on issues relating to disability. He helped draft the sections on disability in the National Assistance Act 1948, was instrumental in the release of the National Health Service's first hearing aid Medresco, and from 1949 until his death he was chairman of the Ministry of Health Health Advisory Committee on Handicapped Persons. His contributions on deafness were respected on both sides of the House, and nearly a decade after his death he was described as "the spokesman for the deaf in this House".

As well as being governor or committee-member of numerous bodies related to disability, he wrote A Manual Alphabet for the Deaf-blind and edited Braille Schools magazine. The Edward Evans Hall, which served as the Beccles Labour Club, now demolished was erected in his honour.

== Family ==
In November 1915, Evans married (Victoria) Evelyn Muir, daughter of Robert Muir. She died in 1953, after the couple had had two sons.

He died at his home in Pinner on 30 March 1960, aged 77.

Parliament of the United Kingdom
Preceded by Pierse Loftus	Member of Parliament for Lowestoft; 1945–1959	Succeeded by Jim Prior
