= Linden Lodge School =

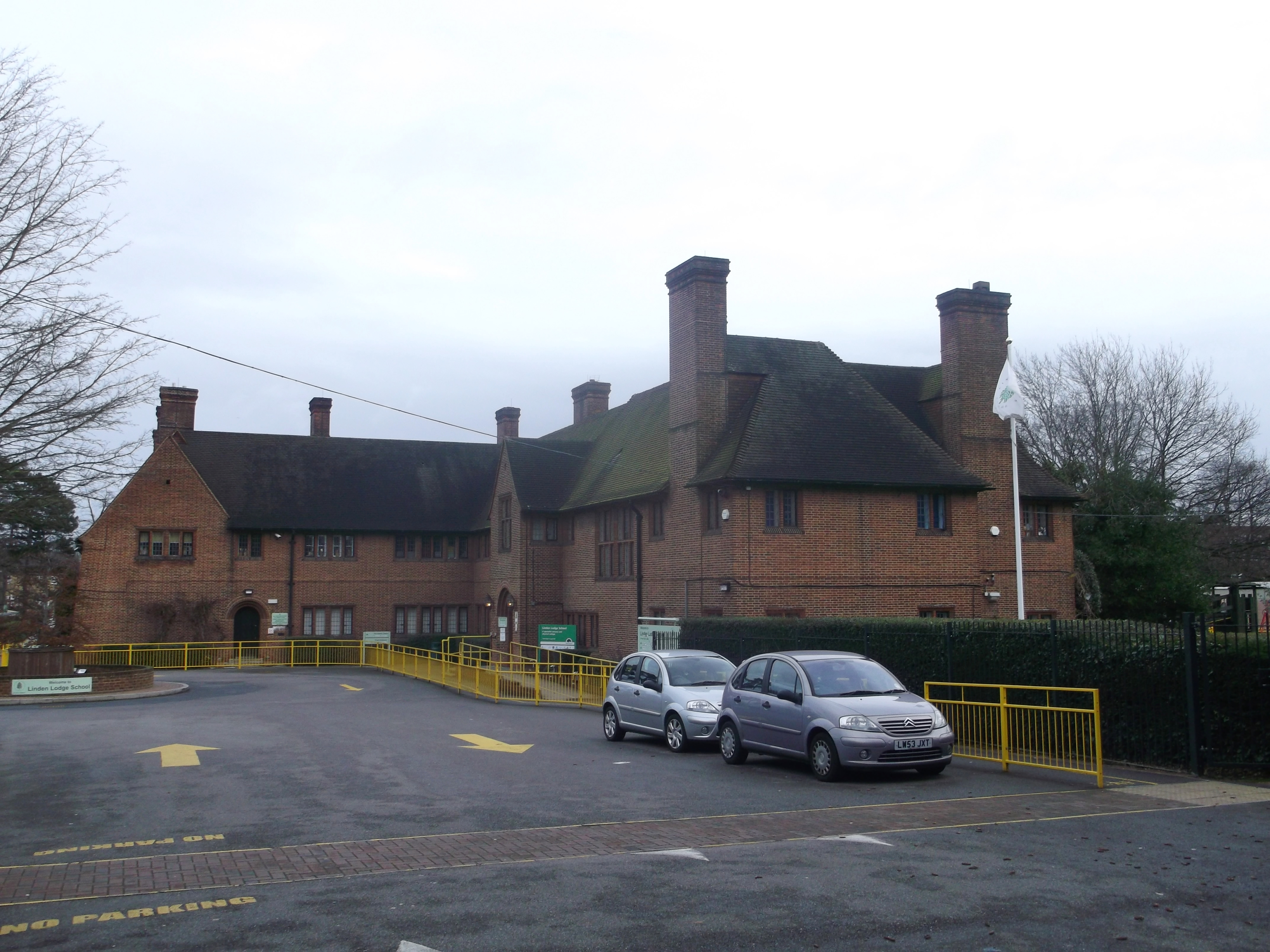

Location
- 61 Princes Way; Wimbledon Park, London, SW19 6JB; England; 51°26′38″N 0°12′47″W

Information
- Type: Special school Academy
- Established: 1902
- Local authority: Wandsworth
- Specialists: Visual Impairment; Multi-disabled Visual Impairment; Profound and Multiple Learning Difficulties
- Department for Education URN: 145709 Tables
- Ofsted: Reports
- CEO: Jacqueline Valin
- Co-Headteachers: Monika Gaweda & Sarah Norris
- Gender: Coeducational
- Age: 2 to 19
- Enrolment: 142
- Houses: Mole, Beverley and Wandle
- Colour
- Architect: Sir Edwin Lutyens
- Architectural style: Mock Tudor
- Website: www.lindenlodge.org.uk

Linden Lodge School for the Blind is a specialist sensory and physical college located in Wimbledon, South London, England. It educates visually impaired children aged between two and nineteen, including those who are multi-disabled visually impaired.

The school was one of two residential schools for blind children opened by the London School Board in 1902. Initially for boys only, the original location of the school was at Wandsworth Common. The present main school building was designed by the architect Sir Edwin Lutyens in 1934.

== History ==
The school's original building at 26 Bolingbroke Grove (known as Linden Lodge) on the east side of Wandsworth Common had been designed in 1876 by the architect E R Robson as a private residence for a retired headmistress, Marjory Peddie. On Peddie's death in 1879, the building was purchased by the School for the Indigent Blind, then located at St George's Fields, Southwark, which opened a school for junior pupils. In 1902, the entire school (including the elementary department) moved to Leatherhead, Surrey and the house was put up for sale again. The building was subsequently taken over by the London School Board and Linden Lodge School (as it is still known today) opened on 10 December 1902. The school educated around fifty blind boys aged between 13 and 16, of whom around forty were boarders. A similar school for visually impaired girls was opened at Elm Court in West Norwood in June of the same year.

During the Second World War the children of both schools were evacuated away from London. The boys returned to Bolingbroke Grove in 1945, however Elm Court School had suffered considerable bomb damage during the Blitz and it was not practical for the girls to resume their education there. After several years at temporary locations in both Brighton and Sunningdale, the girls were moved to North House in Wimbledon (now the main school site) and from 1949 onwards Linden Lodge operated as a single coeducational school split between two locations, under the control of one headmaster: The junior boys and girls (up to the age of ten) were both housed and taught at the North House site, whilst the senior girls were transported by bus each morning to join the older boys for lessons on the Bolingbroke Grove site.

The Bolingbroke Grove site was closed in 1964, when the senior boys moved to a purpose built school in the grounds of North House. Today, 26 Bolingbroke Grove forms part of Northcote Lodge School.

There is a photographic record of a visit to the school by Queen Elizabeth II and Prince Philip, Duke of Edinburgh.

Linden Lodge was the first school in the UK to use the Perkins Upward Brailler to enable their students to type using the Braille alphabet.

=== North House ===
North House was designed by Sir Edwin Lutyens in 1934 for Robert Wilson Black, a partner of the Estate Agents firm Knight & Co. and a local hotelier. In 2006 Sprunt Architects extensively refurbished the original Lutyens house, designed a new residential building for the students and restored the original Gertrude Jekyll garden.

== Wandsworth Sensory Support Services ==
Historically in Wandsworth, having two well-established schools for children with visual impairment (Linden Lodge School) and hearing impairment (Oak Lodge School) and two Sensory Support Services (Hearing Support & Vision Support) meant that there was likely to be a larger than average group of children with combined losses. Following the Linden Lodge School governing body taking oversight for the hearing support service, Wandsworth Sensory Support Service was created to improve joint working between the two Sensory Support Services. On the 18 May 2018 The Isobel Centre a new purpose-built facility opened to house the core office for both Services and specialist assessment rooms on the Linden Lodge School campus.

=== Wandsworth Vision Support Service ===
Wandsworth Vision Support Service is based in the Lodge Family Centre, within the grounds of Linden Lodge School. The Service works in close collaboration with the school, it also provides an outreach service to support all children and young people from birth to 19 years with visual impairment with and without additional needs in the boroughs of Wandsworth and Kensington and Chelsea. The school's governing body oversees the service (Sensory Support Service Committee).

=== Wandsworth Hearing Support Service ===
Wandsworth Hearing Support Service provides outreach support to deaf children and young people in Wandsworth from birth to 19 years of age in both mainstream and special schools. The school's governing body oversees the service (Sensory Support Service Committee).

== ClearVision Project ==
ClearVision is a national postal lending library for visually impaired children and their families based at Linden Lodge School. The library began as a modest collection of braille and print books created in the mid-1980s for students at the school, before becoming an independent charity in 1992. ClearVision books are commercially published children's books with text added in either Braille or Moon and are designed for children with little or no sight to share with sighted children or adults. It also holds a collection of around 1000 tactile image books, in which all the pictures are designed to be explored by touch. The project lends to approximately 1000 families, schools, Sensory Support Services and public libraries in the UK. The Project's patron is Anne Fine, former Children's Laureate, Anne Fine.

== Notable former pupils and staff ==
=== Pupils ===
- Mike Brace CBE (b. 1950) - Paralympic cross-country skier
- Hassan Khan (b. 1987) - visually impaired England cricket player
- Hayley Oliver (b. 1976) - country music singer
- Derek Paravicini (b. 1979) - autistic savant and musical prodigy
- Graham Salmon MBE (1954-1999) - Paralympic athlete
- George Shearing OBE (1919-2011) - jazz pianist
- Peter Young (1956-2002) - Paralympic cross-country skier

=== Staff ===
- Edward Evans CBE (1883-1960) - Labour MP for Lowestoft (1945-1959)
- Adam Ockelford (born 1959) - Professor of Music at the University of Roehampton
