= Pierse Loftus =

Irish-born British businessman and Conservative politician

Pierse Creagh Loftus (29 November 1877 – 20 January 1956) was an Irish-born British businessman and Conservative Party politician. A notable figure in the public life of Lowestoft and East Suffolk for several decades, he sat in the House of Commons from 1934 to 1945 as the Member of Parliament (MP) for the Lowestoft division of Suffolk.

== Early life ==
Loftus was born in County Kilkenny, Ireland. When he was eight years old, he and his brother changed their surnames to Loftus, adopting their grandmother's maiden name.

He was educated at St. Augustine's School in Ramsgate and at The Oratory School in Birmingham. After working in South Africa for three years, where he served with the Maritzburg Defence Force in 1899, he returned to England; in 1902 he bought a share in Adnams Brewery, in Southwold, with his brother Jack. In the First World War he served with the Suffolk Regiment in France, reaching the rank of captain.

He was elected to East Suffolk County Council in 1922, and the following year became vice-chairman of the Lowestoft Conservative Association. In 1931 he became an alderman of the council.

Loftus was the author of a number of books. In 1912, he published 'The Conservative Party and the Future', intended as a contribution to the then vexed debate on his the Conservatives could return to government. More on the business side, Loftus tried to answer the vexing question of job shortages in 'A Main Cause of Unemployment' (1923). In 1926 Loftus published 'The Creed of a Tory', in which he sought to describe what a Conservative was and set out a political programme quit different from that of the Conservative Party nationally. This book included proposals for the indirect election of MPs by county councils, and suggestions of corporate representation.

When Gervais Rentoul, the Conservative MP for Lowestoft, resigned his seat in 1934 to become a Metropolitan Police magistrate, Loftus was selected as the Conservative candidate for the resulting by-election. The Conservative Party was part of the National Government, and Loftus stood as a "National Conservative", i.e. a supporter of the government, with the backing of the other parties in the government. He was opposed by the Labour Party and by an independent Liberal candidate. The campaign was dominated by the issues facing Lowestoft's fishermen, who had suffered from the loss of Russia as a market for herring.

Polling took place on 15 February, and Loftus won the seat with 48% of the votes. Loftus had a majority of 5.9% over the Labour Party candidate, former Leyton West MP Reginald Sorensen, whom he beat by 1,920 votes. This was significantly below Rentoul's majority in the 1931 general election, but Loftus was re-elected in the 1935 election with over 60% of the votes, and held the seat until his defeat at the 1945 general election by the Labour candidate, Edward Evans. While he was a Member of Parliament, he concentrated on agriculture and fishing.

Loftus was a Justice of the Peace in Suffolk for over 25 years, and High Steward of Southwold from 1945 until his death. After leaving Parliament, he became chairman of the Rural Reconstruction Association.

== Family ==
Loftus was married twice, firstly in 1910 to Dorothy Reynolds, with whom he had two sons. Reynolds died in 1943, and in 1945 he married again to Eileen Elkington, the widow of Brigadier-General R. J. G. Elkington and daughter of Claude Marzetti. Dorothy Loftus was an artist, exhibiting in Suffolk and with the Sole Bay Group.

He died at his home in Southwold on 20 January 1956, aged 78.

== Arms ==
Coat of arms of Pierse Loftus

Notes
Granted 2 August 1910 by Nevile Wilkinson, Ulster King of Arms.
Crest
A boar's head erased and erect per pale wavy Argent and Sable.
Torse
Of the colours.
Escutcheon
Quarterly 1st & 4th Sable a chevron engrailed Ermine between three trefoils slipped Argent a bordure wavy of the last (Loftus) 2nd & 3rd quarterly Argent and Gules in the first and fourt a lion rampant of the second in the second and third a garb Or over all a fess embattled counterembattled Sable (Murphy).
Motto
Loyal Au Mort

Parliament of the United Kingdom
Preceded by Gervais Rentoul	Member of Parliament for Lowestoft; 1934 – 1945	Succeeded by Edward Evans
