= 1991 Waveney District Council election =

1991 English local government election

- 2 May 1991

All 48 seats to Waveney District Council 25 seats needed for a majority

	First party	Second party
Party	Labour	Conservative
Seats won	7	7
Seats after	27	14
Seat change	▲1	▼2
Popular vote	15,131	11,897
Percentage	46.0%	36.2%
Swing	▼7.6%	▲7.5%
	Third party	Fourth party
Party	Liberal Democrats	Independent
Seats won	2	0
Seats after	6	1
Seat change	▲1	Steady
Popular vote	5,050	354
Percentage	15.4%	1.1%
Swing	▲3.1%	▼2.4%
- Winner of each seat at the 1991 Waveney District Council election.
Control before election
Labour
Control after election
Labour

The 1991 Waveney District Council election took place on 2 May 1991 to elect members of Waveney District Council in Suffolk, England. This was on the same day as other local elections.

== Summary ==
=== Election result ===
1991 Waveney District Council election
Party	This election			Full council			This election		
Party	Seats	Net	Seats %	Other	Total	Total %	Votes	Votes %	+/−
Labour	7	▲1	43.8	20	27	56.3	15,131	46.0	–7.6
Conservative	7	▼2	43.8	7	14	29.2	11,897	36.2	+7.5
Liberal Democrats	2	▲1	12.5	4	6	12.5	5,050	15.4	+3.1
Independent	0	Steady	0.0	1	1	2.1	354	1.1	–2.4
Green	0	Steady	0.0	0	0	0.0	443	1.3	–0.6

== Ward results ==
Incumbent councillors standing for re-election are marked with an asterisk (*). Changes in seats do not take into account by-elections or defections.

=== Beccles Town ===
Beccles Town
Party	Candidate	Votes	%	±%
Liberal Democrats	E. Crisp*	1,011	36.1	
Conservative	P. Sanders	903	32.2	
Labour	P. Baker	888	31.7	
Majority		108	3.9	
Turnout		2,802	50.0	
Registered electors		5,550		
Liberal Democrats hold		Swing		

=== Beccles Worlingham ===
Beccles Worlingham
Party	Candidate	Votes	%	±%
Labour	H. Ley	932	58.6	
Conservative	H. Durie*	659	41.4	
Majority		273	17.2	
Turnout		1,591	42.0	
Registered electors		3,745		
Labour gain from Conservative		Swing		

=== Blything ===
Blything
Party	Candidate	Votes	%	±%
Conservative	M. Nichols	404	40.1	
Independent	E. Woodard	354	35.2	
Labour	A. Martin	249	24.7	
Majority		50	5.0	
Turnout		1,007	60.0	
Registered electors		1,685		
Conservative hold		Swing		

=== Bungay ===
Bungay
Party	Candidate	Votes	%	±%
Conservative	J. Palin*	949	52.3	
Labour	D. Jermy	864	47.7	
Majority		85	4.7	
Turnout		1,813	49.0	
Registered electors		3,722		
Conservative hold		Swing		

=== Carlton ===
Carlton
Party	Candidate	Votes	%	±%
Conservative	N. Brighouse*	1,131	44.9	
Labour	K. Hunting	887	35.2	
Liberal Democrats	C. Thomas	501	19.9	
Majority		244	9.7	
Turnout		2,519	41.0	
Registered electors		6,140		
Conservative hold		Swing		

=== Gunton ===
Gunton
Party	Candidate	Votes	%	±%
Conservative	P. Browne	1,438	63.5	
Labour	R. Durrant	826	36.5	
Majority		612	27.0	
Turnout		2,264	44.0	
Registered electors		5,201		
Conservative hold		Swing		

=== Halesworth ===
Halesworth
Party	Candidate	Votes	%	±%
Labour	H. Holzer	961	55.2	
Conservative	R. Niblett*	779	44.8	
Majority		182	10.5	
Turnout		1,740	48.0	
Registered electors		3,633		
Labour gain from Conservative		Swing		

=== Harbour ===
Harbour
Party	Candidate	Votes	%	±%
Labour	J. Reynolds	962	66.1	
Conservative	L. Guy	294	20.2	
Liberal Democrats	I. Burnett	200	13.7	
Majority		668	45.9	
Turnout		1,456	36.0	
Registered electors		4,082		
Labour hold		Swing		

=== Kirkley ===
Kirkley
Party	Candidate	Votes	%	±%
Liberal Democrats	A. Shepherd	982	46.4	
Labour	R. Anderson	779	36.8	
Conservative	F. Gaimster	275	13.0	
Green	S. Blease	82	3.9	
Majority		203	9.6	
Turnout		2,118	46.0	
Registered electors		4,616		
Liberal Democrats gain from Labour		Swing		

=== Lothingland ===
Lothingland
Party	Candidate	Votes	%	±%
Conservative	A. Choveaux	920	45.9	
Labour	A. Brooks	849	42.4	
Green	M. Southern	234	11.7	
Majority		71	3.5	
Turnout		2,003	45.0	
Registered electors		4,410		
Conservative hold		Swing		

=== Normanston ===
Normanston
Party	Candidate	Votes	%	±%
Labour	P. Hunt*	1,184	72.9	
Liberal Democrats	I. Crocker	441	27.1	
Majority		743	45.7	
Turnout		1,625	36.0	
Registered electors		4,512		
Labour hold		Swing		

=== Oulton Broad ===
Oulton Broad
Party	Candidate	Votes	%	±%
Conservative	M. Barnard*	1,111	43.5	
Labour	J. Coleman	837	32.7	
Liberal Democrats	A. Tibbitt	608	23.8	
Majority		274	10.7	
Turnout		2,556	48.0	
Registered electors		5,296		
Conservative hold		Swing		

=== Pakefield ===
Pakefield
Party	Candidate	Votes	%	±%
Labour	Robert Blizzard*	1,660	60.8	
Conservative	J. Halls	1,070	39.2	
Majority		590	21.6	
Turnout		2,730	49.0	
Registered electors		5,614		
Labour hold		Swing		

=== Southwold ===
Southwold
Party	Candidate	Votes	%	±%
Conservative	S. Simpson*	1,149	41.2	
Liberal Democrats	D. Beavan	842	30.2	
Labour	A. Clarke	673	24.1	
Green	A. Milton	127	4.6	
Majority		307	11.0	
Turnout		2,791	55.0	
Registered electors		5,108		
Conservative hold		Swing		

=== St. Margarets ===
St. Margarets
Party	Candidate	Votes	%	±%
Labour	L. Owen*	1,207	60.7	
Conservative	J. Albrow	500	25.2	
Liberal Democrats	G. Wood	280	14.1	
Majority		707	35.6	
Turnout		1,987	37.0	
Registered electors		5,412		
Labour hold		Swing		

=== Whitton ===
Whitton
Party	Candidate	Votes	%	±%
Labour	T. Chipperfield*	1,373	73.3	
Conservative	A. Gowers	315	16.8	
Liberal Democrats	R. Paterson	185	9.9	
Majority		1,058	56.5	
Turnout		1,873	42.0	
Registered electors		4,481		
Labour hold		Swing		
