= Broomwood School =

Location
- 26 Bolingbroke Grove; Wandsworth Common, SW11 6EL; England
- Coordinates: 51.451774°N 0.165721°W

Information
- Motto: BeYourBEST
- Religious affiliation: Church of England
- Established: 1984
- Founder: Lady Colquhoun of Luss
- Local authority: Wandsworth
- Headmaster: Michael Hodge (Principal of Broomwood group of schools)
- Staff: 30
- Gender: Boys and girls
- Age: 3 to 13
- Enrolment: 580
- Capacity: 580
- Houses: Blenkarne, Rusham, Sudbrooke, Thurleigh
- Website: www.broomwood.com

Broomwood School is an independent preparatory school for boys and girls aged 3–13. The school is located across four sites, all near Wandsworth Common in south-west London.

== History ==
A pre-preparatory school for boys and girls was founded by Katharine Mears in 1984 as Broomwood Hall School. Located in the Methodist Church Hall on Broomwood Road in Wandsworth, it began with 12 children. Nearly a decade later, Northcote Lodge School, for boys aged 8–13, was established on 5 September 1993 by Sir Malcolm and Lady Katharine Colquhoun. The school's premises at 26 Bolingbroke Grove, next to Wandsworth Common, were the former location of Linden Lodge School for the Blind. Broomwood Hall School was reorganised as Broomwood Hall Lower School for boys and girls aged 4–8 and Broomwood Hall Upper School for girls aged 8–13 located at separate sites on Nightingale Lane. While still under family ownership, these schools formed Northwood Schools.

Northwood Senior, for boys and girls aged 11–16, opened in 2020 at Garrad's Road, on the site of what was then one of the pre-prep departments of Broomwood Hall Lower School.

In 2021, these schools became part of the Dukes Education group of schools. In 2023, the schools adopted one name, Broomwood, a school for boys and girls aged 3–13.

Northwood Senior became London Park School Clapham in September 2023, still part of the Dukes Education group but no longer part of Broomwood.

== Organisation and admission ==
Broomwood school is organised across four sites, all located near to each other and close to Wandsworth Common in south-west London. The four sites are Broomwood Pre-Prep (boys and girls, aged 3–7), which is split between two buildings a short walk from each other at 50 Nightingale Lane and 192 Ramsden Road; Broomwood Prep - Boys (aged 7–13) at 26 Bolingbroke Grove; and Broomwood Prep - Girls (aged 7–13) at 68-74 Nightingale Lane.

Entry to the Prep schools is primarily via Broomwood Pre-Prep. There is also a 7+ entry for external candidates. There are academic and music scholarships for boys and girls interested in the Prep school. The school has some places available at 11+ entry for boys and girls who are looking to move on to a boarding or day schools at age 13.
