= Jim Prior =

British politician (1927–2016)

The Right Honourable The Lord Prior PC

Secretary of State for Northern Ireland
- In office 14 September 1981 – 27 September 1984
- Prime Minister: Margaret Thatcher
- Preceded by: Humphrey Atkins
- Succeeded by: Douglas Hurd

Secretary of State for Employment
- In office 4 May 1979 – 14 September 1981
- Prime Minister: Margaret Thatcher
- Preceded by: Albert Booth
- Succeeded by: Norman Tebbit

Leader of the House of Commons; Lord President of the Council
- In office 5 November 1972 – 4 March 1974
- Prime Minister: Edward Heath
- Preceded by: Robert Carr
- Succeeded by: Edward Short

Minister of Agriculture, Fisheries and Food
- In office 20 June 1970 – 5 November 1972
- Prime Minister: Edward Heath
- Preceded by: Cledwyn Hughes
- Succeeded by: Joseph Godber

Member of Parliament for Waveney (Lowestoft, 1959–1983)
- In office 8 October 1959 – 18 May 1987
- Preceded by: Edward Evans
- Succeeded by: David Porter

Member of the House of Lords
- Lord Temporal
- Life peerage 14 October 1987 – 12 December 2016
Shadow Cabinet positions
Shadow Secretary of State for Employment
In office 29 October 1974 – 4 May 1979
Leader	Margaret Thatcher
Preceded by	Reg Prentice
Succeeded by	Albert Booth
Shadow Home Secretary
In office 11 March 1974 – 13 June 1974
Leader	Edward Heath
Preceded by	Roy Jenkins
Succeeded by	Keith Joseph

Personal details
- Born: James Michael Leathes Prior; 11 October 1927 Norwich, Norfolk, England
- Died: 12 December 2016 (aged 89) Brampton, Suffolk, England
- Party: Conservative
- Spouse: Jane Lywood (m. 1954; died 2015)
- Children: 4 (including David)
- Education: Charterhouse School
- Alma mater: Pembroke College, Cambridge

James Michael Leathes Prior, Baron Prior, PC (11 October 1927 – 12 December 2016) was a British Conservative Party politician. A Member of Parliament from 1959 to 1987, he represented the Suffolk constituency of Lowestoft until 1983 and then the renamed constituency of Waveney from 1983 to 1987, when he stood down from the House of Commons and was made a life peer. He served in two Conservative cabinets, and outside parliament was Chairman of the Arab British Chamber of Commerce from 1996 to 2004, and Chancellor of Anglia Ruskin University from 1992 to 1999.

Under Edward Heath, Prior was Minister of Agriculture, Fisheries and Food from 1970 to 1972, then Leader of the House of Commons until Heath lost office in the wake of the February 1974 election. His party returned to power under Margaret Thatcher in 1979, and Prior was Secretary of State for Employment from 1979 to 1981, disagreeing with some of her views on trade unions and her monetarist economic policies generally. This made him a leader of the so-called "wet" faction in the Conservative ranks. In 1981 he was moved to the less pivotal role of Secretary of State for Northern Ireland, from which he stood down in 1984; he never returned to government.

== Early life and career ==
Prior was born in Norwich, the son of solicitor Charles Bolingbroke Leathes Prior (1883–1964) and Aileen Sophia Mary (1893–1978), daughter of barrister Charles Storey Gilman. Charles Prior's uncle was head of the family of Prior of Adstock Manor, Bletchley, Buckinghamshire; the family was closely related to the Lake baronets, the Stuart-Menteth baronets, the Blackett family of Wylam, Northumberland, and the Prideaux-Brune family of Prideaux Place, Cornwall. Prior was educated at Orwell Park School, then at Charterhouse School before going on to Pembroke College, Cambridge, where he earned a first class honours degree in Land economy. Also prior to entering university, he performed his two-year National Service as an officer in the Royal Norfolk Regiment of the British Army, serving in Germany and India.

He was first elected to Parliament in 1959, and was Minister of Agriculture, Fisheries and Food from 1970 to 1972, then Leader of the House of Commons and Lord President of the Council until March 1974. He was one of several unsuccessful candidates in the Conservative Party's 1975 leadership election, entering at the second round and gaining 19 votes to Margaret Thatcher's 146.

== Cabinet years ==
Under Margaret Thatcher he was Secretary of State for Employment from May 1979 to 14 September 1981. Thatcher said of their relationship, "we agreed that trade unions had acquired far too many powers and privileges. We also agreed that these must be dealt with one step at a time. But when it came down to specific measures, there was deep disagreement about how fast and how far to move."

Prior is believed to have annoyed Thatcher by being too friendly with trade union leaders, with Thatcher writing,

"He [Prior] had forged good relations with a number of trade union leaders whose practical value he perhaps overestimated."

During his period in the Cabinet, he is believed to have angered the right wing of his party and the Prime Minister for not pressing far enough with anti-trade union legislation. In the September 1981 cabinet reshuffle Prior was moved from the Employment portfolio to become Secretary of State for Northern Ireland, an office he held until September 1984. At the time of the reshuffle, it was reported that Prior considered following the sacked Ian Gilmour to the back benches to oppose the Thatcher Government's economic policies. However, Prior ultimately decided to accept being moved to the Northern Ireland Office after consulting cabinet colleagues William Whitelaw, then Deputy Leader of the Conservative Party, and Francis Pym. This transfer was widely seen as a move by Thatcher to isolate Prior, who disagreed with her on a number of economic issues. The post of Secretary of State for Northern Ireland was seen as a dumping ground to marginalise ministers. However, when Prior resigned, Thatcher revealed that she was going to offer him another Cabinet post during the reshuffle, which would have very likely been a non-economic one.

== Later years ==
In 1986, he collaborated with John Cassels and Pauline Perry to create the Council for Industry and Higher Education (CIHE), which would become the National Centre for Universities and Business in 2013. He also released a memoir, A balance of power.

He retired from Parliament in 1987, and was created a life peer as Baron Prior, of Brampton in the County of Suffolk, on 14 October 1987.

He was chairman and later vice-president of the Rural Housing Trust from 1990 to 1999.

In 1992 he was appointed chancellor of Anglia Ruskin University and held that position until 1999. He was made Honorary Doctor of the University at Anglia Ruskin University in 1992.

Following his retirement from politics he was much sought after in the world of business: he served as chairman of both GEC and Allders, and had directorships at Barclays, Sainsbury's and United Biscuits.

Prior was interviewed about the rise of Thatcherism for the 2006 BBC TV documentary series Tory! Tory! Tory! and in 2012 as part of The History of Parliament's oral history project.

== Personal life and death ==
In January 1954, Prior married Jane Primrose Gifford Lywood, daughter of Air Vice-Marshal Oswyn George William Gifford Lywood, CB, CBE, a developer of the Typex cypher machines, of a landed gentry family of Woodlands, near Sevenoaks, Kent. They were married until her death in 2015, and had four children. Their eldest son David Prior held the seat of North Norfolk between 1997 and 2001, and was appointed Parliamentary-Under Secretary of State for NHS Productivity; he was later, in May 2015, elevated to the peerage in his own right as Baron Prior of Brampton.

Lord Prior lived at the Old Hall in Brampton, Suffolk, where he died from cancer on 12 December 2016, at the age of 89.

Following Prior's death, Keith Simpson MP said of him: "In many ways he was a larger than life figure. He had a ruddy face, he played up to being the farmer. People underestimated him because he didn't claim to be a Keith Joseph or Enoch Powell parading their intellectualism. But he was somebody who was well-loved by the grassroots and was a decent man who was in politics out of a sense of public service."

Parliament of the United Kingdom
Preceded by Edward Evans	Member of Parliament for Lowestoft; 1959–1983	Constituency abolished
New constituency	Member of Parliament for Waveney; 1983–1987	Succeeded by David Porter
Political offices
Preceded by Cledwyn Hughes	Minister of Agriculture, Fisheries and Food; 1970–1972	Succeeded by Joseph Godber
Preceded by Robert Carr	Leader of the House of Commons; 1972–1974	Succeeded by Edward Short
Preceded by Robert Carr	Lord President of the Council; 1972–1974	Succeeded by Edward Short
Preceded by Albert Booth	Secretary of State for Employment; 1979–1981	Succeeded by Norman Tebbit
Preceded by Humphrey Atkins	Secretary of State for Northern Ireland; 1981–1984	Succeeded by Douglas Hurd
