= 1934 Lowestoft by-election =

UK parliamentary by-election

- 15 February 1934
Candidate	Pierse Loftus	Reginald Sorensen	William Smith
Party	Conservative	Labour	Liberal
Popular vote	15,912	13,992	3,304
Percentage	47.9%	42.1%	10.0%
MP before election
Gervais Rentoul
Conservative
Subsequent MP
Pierse Creagh Loftus
Conservative

The 1934 Lowestoft by-election was an election held for the House of Commons of the United Kingdom's constituency of Lowestoft, it was the first ever by election in the constituency. It was held on Thursday 15 February 1934, polling stations opened between the hours of 8 am and 10 pm.

== Vacancy ==
The Conservative Party Member of Parliament (MP) Sir Gervais Rentoul resigned upon appointment as a Metropolitan Police Court Magistrate.

== Last result ==
1931 United Kingdom general election Electorate 47,737
Party	Candidate	Votes	%	±%
Conservative	Gervais Rentoul	22,886	67.8	+28.0
Labour	Edward Neep	10,894	32.2	+3.3
Majority		11,992	35.6	+27.1
Turnout		33,780		
Conservative hold		Swing		

== Candidates ==
The candidates selected for the by election, were as follows Pierse Loftus who stood on behalf of the Conservative Party, Reginald Sorensen was selected on behalf of the Labour Party. William Smith a local Alderman and Justice of the Peace, stood for the Liberal Party. Some records describe Smith as an 'Independent Liberal', a term that was often used at this time to describe the official Liberal Party that was led by Sir Herbert Samuel, who opposed the National Government. However, there should be no doubt that Smith was an official Liberal candidate and was claimed as such in The Liberal Party Yearbook at the time.

== Campaign ==
In the weeks and months leading up to the election several meetings took place. The Labour Party's meetings focussed on the town's fishing industry. An advert appeared in the Lowestoft Journal of 1934 stating that a meeting would take place at the towns hippodrome on Sunday 4 February 1934 at 7.30 pm. Guest speakers included the Rt Hon. Ted Kennedy, Noel Palmer and the Labour Party candidate himself.

The Conservative Party also decided to focus their campaign on the local fishing industry and Loftus conducted many meetings, in the run up to the election, this included one with the Southwold's women unionists. Loftus also conducted a constituency meeting on the Claremont Pier pavilion, where he was joined by speakers Geoff Shakespeare, a Liberal National MP for Norwich. The constituency meeting was described in a local paper as "full and lively".

Whereas William Smith the Liberal decided to concentrate his campaign on unemployment, this included unemployment at a national and a local level.

== Result ==
The Conservative Party held the seat with a far narrower majority.

Lowestoft by-election, 1934
Party	Candidate	Votes	%	±%
Conservative	Pierse Loftus	15,912	47.9	−19.9
Labour	Reginald Sorensen	13,992	42.1	+9.8
Liberal	William Smith	3,304	10.0	New
Majority		1,920	5.8	−29.8
Turnout		33,208	67.9	
Conservative hold		Swing	-14.9	

The Liberal vote was substantially down from its 1929 level. William Smith forfeited his deposit under Section 27 of the Representation of the People Act 1918.

== See also ==
- Gervais Rentoul
