= Waveney (constituency) =

UK Parliament constituency (1983–2024)

Coordinates: 52.4°N 1.5°E

- Former county constituency for the House of Commons
- Boundary of Waveney in Suffolk

- Location of Suffolk within England
- County: Suffolk
- Electorate: 79,132 (December 2010)
- Major settlements: Lowestoft

1983–2024
- Seats: One
- Created from: Lowestoft
- Replaced by: Lowestoft and Waveney Valley

Waveney was a constituency (Note: A county constituency (for the purposes of election expenses and type of returning officer)) of in the House of Commons of the UK Parliament that existed from 1983 to 2024. (Note: As with all constituencies, the constituency elects one Member of Parliament (MP) by the first past the post system of election at least every five years.) It returned one Member of Parliament (MP) to the House of Commons of the Parliament of the United Kingdom.

Under the 2023 Periodic Review of Westminster constituencies, the constituency reverted to its previous name of Lowestoft. Other than the town of Bungay, the abolished seat of Waveney has little in common with the new ‘Waveney Valley’ constituency, which covers a predominantly rural area bridging Norfolk and Suffolk.

== Constituency profile ==
The seat was based around the coastal town of Lowestoft and included several smaller market towns and seaside resorts in northeast Suffolk. Electoral Calculus described the seat as a "Somewhere", characterised by older, less educated voters and support for Brexit.

Lowestoft was generally Labour-voting, because of its recent history as a declining seaside resort, fishing and industrial town. However, the constituency also includes the small towns of Beccles and Bungay. The Green Party overtook the Conservatives in the overlapping East Suffolk Council in 2023 for the first time.

This corner of Suffolk arguably has stronger connections with Norfolk – Norwich is an easier centre to reach than Ipswich – and there have been unsuccessful proposals to alter the county boundary to reflect this.

== History ==
The seat was created for the 1983 general election following the implementation of the third periodic review of Westminster constituencies, broadly replacing Lowestoft, which the first victor of the new seat had served since 1959.

=== Political history ===
Waveney was a bellwether since its creation, swinging heavily in line with the mood of the nation. Labour's big majority in 1997 reflected the large overall majority in the Commons, and by the 2010 election it had become touted by one published analysis as the seat that the Conservatives needed to win to secure an overall majority. Fittingly, 2010 saw a marginal majority and the national result was a hung parliament with the Conservative Party the largest party. 2010 here was the Labour Party's second highest share of the vote in the narrow, traditional grouping of East Anglia (Suffolk, Norfolk and Essex).

=== Prominent frontbenchers ===
Waveney had been held for many years by James Prior, Minister of Agriculture, Fisheries and Food (1970–1972), Leader of the House of Commons (Note: and Lord President of the Council) (1972–1974), Secretary of State for Employment (1979–1981), then Secretary of State for Northern Ireland during the Thatcher ministry, with an economic politics considered more centre-ground, then known as forming the wets' ideology.

Bob Blizzard served as a senior Government Whip from 2008 until 2010 when he lost at the election that May.

== Boundaries and boundary changes ==
1983–1997

- The District of Waveney.

The constituency was formed from the abolished constituency of Lowestoft, with the exception of a small part in the north which was now part of Norfolk.

Map of boundaries 2010-2024

1997–2010

- The District of Waveney except the wards of Blything, Halesworth, and Southwold.

Three wards transferred to Suffolk Coastal.

2010–2024

- The District of Waveney wards of Beccles North, Beccles South, Bungay, Carlton, Carlton Colville, Gunton and Corton, Harbour, Kessingland, Kirkley, Lothingland, Normanston, Oulton, Oulton Broad, Pakefield, St Margaret's, The Saints, Wainford, Whitton, and Worlingham.

Marginal changes due to revision of local authority wards.

== Members of Parliament ==
Election	Member	Party
1983	Jim Prior	Conservative
1987	David Porter	Conservative
1997	Bob Blizzard	Labour
2010	Peter Aldous	Conservative

== Elections ==
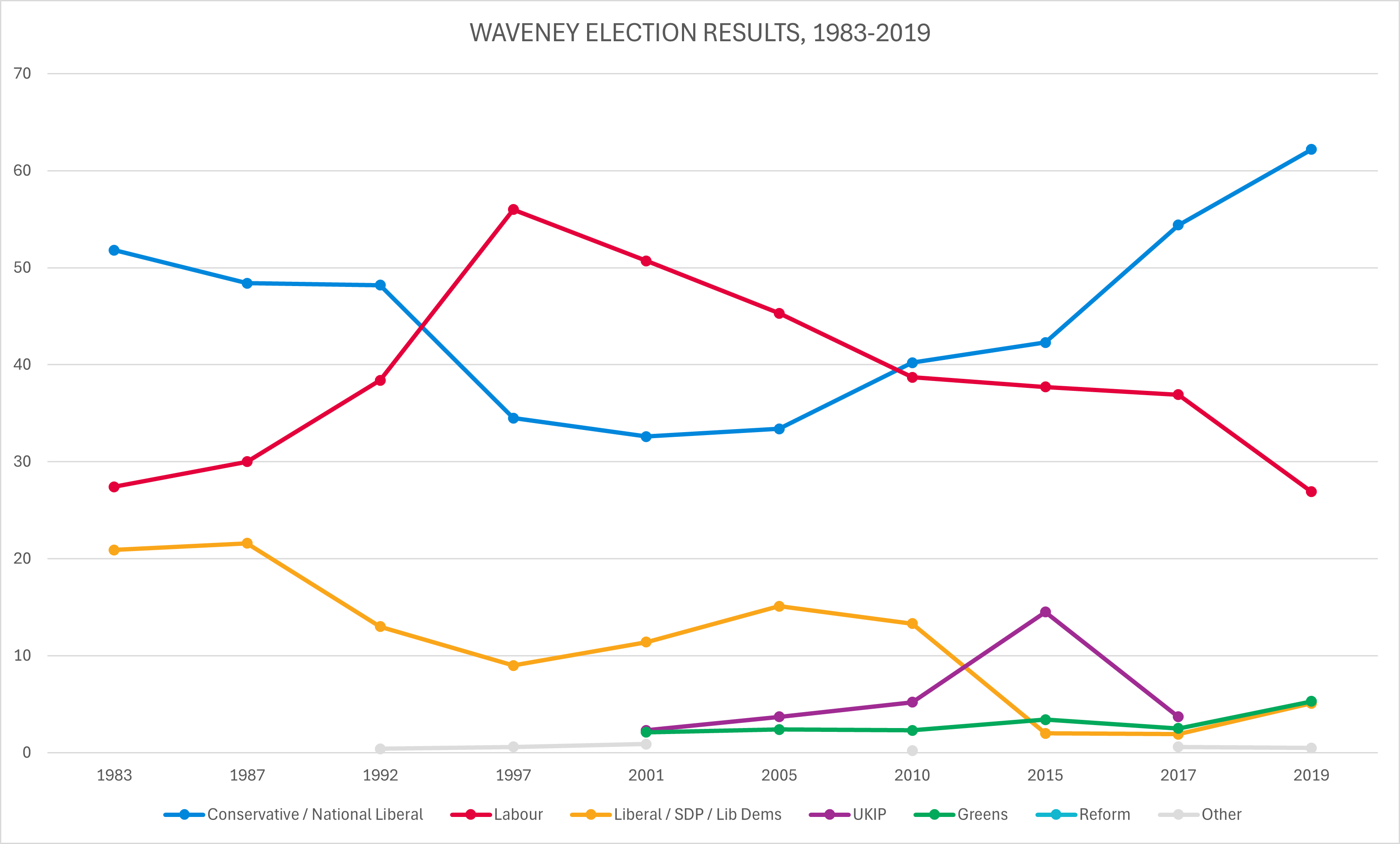
Election results 1983-2019

=== Elections in the 2010s ===
General election 2019: Waveney
Party	Candidate	Votes	%	±%
Conservative	Peter Aldous	31,778	62.2	+7.8
Labour	Sonia Barker	13,776	26.9	−10.0
Green	Elfrede Brambley-Crawshaw	2,727	5.3	+2.8
Liberal Democrats	Helen Korfanty	2,603	5.1	+3.2
CPA	Dave Brennan	245	0.5	New
Majority		18,002	35.3	+17.8
Turnout		51,129	61.8	−3.4
Conservative hold		Swing	+8.9	

General election 2017: Waveney
Party	Candidate	Votes	%	±%
Conservative	Peter Aldous	28,643	54.4	+12.1
Labour	Sonia Barker	19,428	36.9	−0.8
UKIP	Bert Poole	1,933	3.7	−10.8
Green	Elfrede Brambley-Crawshaw	1,332	2.5	−0.9
Liberal Democrats	Jacky Howe	1,012	1.9	−0.1
Independent	Allyson Barron	326	0.6	New
Majority		9,215	17.5	+12.9
Turnout		52,674	65.2	+0.1
Conservative hold		Swing	+6.5	

General election 2015: Waveney
Party	Candidate	Votes	%	±%
Conservative	Peter Aldous	22,104	42.3	+2.1
Labour	Bob Blizzard	19,696	37.7	−1.0
UKIP	Simon Tobin	7,580	14.5	+9.3
Green	Graham Elliott	1,761	3.4	+1.1
Liberal Democrats	Stephen Gordon	1,055	2.0	−11.3
Majority		2,408	4.6	+3.1
Turnout		52,196	65.1	0.0
Conservative hold		Swing	+1.6	

General election 2010: Waveney
Party	Candidate	Votes	%	±%
Conservative	Peter Aldous	20,571	40.2	+6.9
Labour	Bob Blizzard	19,802	38.7	−6.6
Liberal Democrats	Alan Dean	6,811	13.3	−1.8
UKIP	Jack Tyler	2,684	5.2	+1.5
Green	Graham Elliott	1,167	2.3	−0.1
NOTA	Louis Barfe	106	0.2	New
Majority		769	1.5	N/A
Turnout		51,141	65.1	+1.5
Conservative gain from Labour		Swing	+6.8	

=== Elections in the 2000s ===
General election 2005: Waveney
Party	Candidate	Votes	%	±%
Labour	Bob Blizzard	22,505	45.3	−5.4
Conservative	Peter Aldous	16,590	33.4	+0.8
Liberal Democrats	Nick Bromley	7,497	15.1	+3.7
UKIP	Brian Aylett	1,861	3.7	+1.4
Green	Graham Elliott	1,200	2.4	+0.3
Majority		5,915	11.9	−6.2
Turnout		49,653	64.4	+3.6
Labour hold		Swing	−3.1	

General election 2001: Waveney
Party	Candidate	Votes	%	±%
Labour	Bob Blizzard	23,914	50.7	−5.3
Conservative	Lee Scott	15,361	32.6	−1.9
Liberal Democrats	David Young	5,370	11.4	+2.4
UKIP	Bryan Aylett	1,097	2.3	New
Green	Graham Elliott	983	2.1	New
Socialist Alliance	Rupert Mallin	442	0.9	New
Majority		8,553	18.1	−3.4
Turnout		47,167	60.8	−13.9
Labour hold		Swing	−1.7	

=== Elections in the 1990s ===
General election 1997: Waveney
Party	Candidate	Votes	%	±%
Labour	Bob Blizzard	31,486	56.0	+16.2
Conservative	David Porter	19,393	34.5	−12.5
Liberal Democrats	Christopher Thomas	5,054	9.0	−3.8
Independent	Neil Clark	318	0.6	New
Majority		12,093	21.5	N/A
Turnout		56,251	74.7	−7.1
Labour gain from Conservative		Swing	+15.6	

General election 1992: Waveney
Party	Candidate	Votes	%	±%
Conservative	David Porter	33,174	48.2	−0.2
Labour	Ezra Leverett	26,472	38.4	+8.4
Liberal Democrats	Adrian Rogers	8,925	13.0	−8.6
Natural Law	David Hook	302	0.4	New
Majority		6,702	9.8	−8.4
Turnout		68,873	81.8	+3.4
Conservative hold		Swing	−4.3	

=== Elections in the 1980s ===
General election 1987: Waveney
Party	Candidate	Votes	%	±%
Conservative	David Porter	31,067	48.4	−3.4
Labour	Jack Lark	19,284	30.0	+2.6
SDP	David Beavan	13,845	21.6	+0.7
Majority		11,783	18.4	−6.0
Turnout		81,889	78.4	+3.1
Conservative hold		Swing	−3.0	

General election 1983: Waveney
Party	Candidate	Votes	%	±%
Conservative	Jim Prior	30,371	51.8	
Labour	Jack Lark	16,073	27.4	
SDP	Gillian Artis	12,234	20.9	
Majority		14,298	24.4	
Turnout		77,960	75.3	
Conservative win (new seat)				

== See also ==
- List of parliamentary constituencies in Suffolk
