= 1983 Waveney District Council election =

1983 English local government election

- 5 May 1983

All 48 seats to Waveney District Council 25 seats needed for a majority

	First party	Second party	Third party
Party	Conservative	Labour	Alliance
Seats won	27	17	2
Seat change	▼5	Steady	▼1
Popular vote	31,511	30,513	8,135
Percentage	41.7%	40.4%	10.8%
Swing	▼6.2%	▼5.3%	▲7.2%
	Fourth party	Fifth party
Party	Independent	Residents
Seats won	2	0
Seat change	▼2	▼1
Popular vote	5,163	253
Percentage	6.8%	0.3%
Swing	▲4.5%	▼0.3%
- Winner of each seat at the 1983 Waveney District Council election.
Control before election
Conservative
Control after election
Conservative

The 1983 Waveney District Council election took place on 5 May 1983 to elect members of Waveney District Council in Suffolk, England. This was on the same day as other local elections.

The whole council was up for election on new ward boundaries, decreasing the number of seats by 9 to 48.

== Summary ==
=== Election result ===
1983 Waveney District Council election
Party	Candidates	Seats	Gains	Losses	Net gain/loss	Seats %	Votes %	Votes	+/−
Conservative	37	27	N/A	N/A	▼5	56.3	41.7	31,511	–6.2
Labour	43	17	N/A	N/A	Steady	35.4	40.4	30,513	–5.3
Alliance	17	2	N/A	N/A	▼1	4.2	10.8	8,135	+7.2
Independent	8	2	N/A	N/A	▼2	4.2	6.8	5,163	+4.5
Residents	1	0	N/A	N/A	▼1	0.0	0.3	253	–0.3

== Ward results ==
Incumbent councillors standing for re-election are marked with an asterisk (*). Changes in seats do not take into account by-elections or defections.

=== Beccles Town ===
Beccles Town (3 seats)
Party	Candidate	Votes	%
Conservative	P. Wooden	1,096	46.9
Conservative	D. Hartley	1,043	44.6
Conservative	D. Hipperson	866	37.0
Independent	R. Ellwood	656	28.0
Independent	E. Crisp	590	25.2
Labour	G. Westwood	578	24.7
Labour	J. Yates	483	20.7
Labour	S. Tillett	425	18.2
Independent	A. Dean	423	18.1
Turnout		~2,328	43.9
Registered electors		5,304	
Conservative win (new seat)			
Conservative win (new seat)			
Conservative win (new seat)			

=== Beccles Worlingham ===
Beccles Worlingham (2 seats)
Party	Candidate	Votes	%
Conservative	P. Plummer	785	57.1
Conservative	E. Gallant	646	47.0
Labour	A. Hutchinson	594	43.2
Labour	C. Adam	558	40.6
Turnout		~1,378	41.5
Registered electors		3,320	
Conservative win (new seat)			
Conservative win (new seat)			

=== Blything ===
Blything
Party	Candidate	Votes	%	±%
Conservative	K. Currie	497	56.6	
Labour	A. Swan	223	25.4	
Alliance	R. Winyard	158	18.0	
Majority		274	31.2	
Turnout		879	51.5	
Registered electors		1,706		
Conservative hold				

=== Bungay ===
Bungay (2 seats)
Party	Candidate	Votes	%
Conservative	J. Palin	886	41.3
Alliance	D. Richardson	869	40.5
Conservative	D. Crockett	471	22.0
Labour	D. Huthard	396	18.5
Labour	J. Jervis	383	17.9
Alliance	E. Faber	226	10.6
Turnout		~2,151	65.3
Registered electors		3,293	
Conservative win (new boundaries)			
Alliance win (new boundaries)			

=== Carlton ===
This result was missing from the source document.

=== Carlton Colville ===
Carlton Colville
Party	Candidate	Votes	%
Independent	J. Mitchell	793	67.0
Labour	A. Allerton	391	33.0
Majority		402	34.0
Turnout		~1,186	20.2
Registered electors		5,870	
Independent win (new boundaries)			

=== Gunton ===
Gunton (3 seats)
Party	Candidate	Votes	%
Conservative	D. Cullum	1,331	54.5
Conservative	N. Brighouse	1,313	53.8
Conservative	J. Aldous	1,257	51.5
Labour	E. Lark	607	24.9
Labour	A. Owen	554	22.7
Alliance	J. Stannard	504	20.6
Alliance	A. Moles	363	14.9
Alliance	K. Pointon	346	14.2
Turnout		~2,441	48.6
Registered electors		5,021	
Conservative win (new boundaries)			
Conservative win (new boundaries)			
Conservative win (new boundaries)			

=== Halesworth ===
Halesworth (2 seats)
Party	Candidate	Votes	%	±%
Conservative	R. Niblett	773	43.5	
Labour	E. Leverett	735	41.4	
Conservative	J. Rees	699	39.4	
Labour	A. Holzer	669	37.7	
Alliance	J. Winyard	268	15.1	
Turnout		~1,777	57.3	
Registered electors		3,100		
Conservative hold				
Labour hold				

=== Harbour ===
Harbour (3 seats)
Party	Candidate	Votes	%
Labour	P. Ramm	720	44.2
Labour	R. Ford	677	41.6
Alliance	J. Sparham	657	40.3
Labour	C. Digby	616	37.8
Alliance	A. Chamberlain	476	29.3
Alliance	D. Woodruff	473	29.1
Residents	R. Allen	253	15.5
Turnout		~1,633	40.4
Registered electors		4,038	
Labour win (new seat)			
Labour win (new seat)			
Alliance win (new seat)			

=== Kessingland ===
Kessingland (2 seats)
Party	Candidate	Votes	%	±%
Conservative	B. Reader	810	44.0	
Independent	E. Martin	537	29.2	
Labour	R. Saunders	492	26.8	
Labour	K. McGhee	398	21.7	
Turnout		~1,840	56.1	
Registered electors		3,280		
Conservative hold				
Independent hold				

=== Kirkley ===
Kirkley (3 seats)
Party	Candidate	Votes	%
Labour	T. Carter	954	40.2
Labour	M. Hall	818	34.5
Labour	A. Jurd	787	33.2
Conservative	C. Clark	756	31.9
Conservative	M. Read	722	30.5
Conservative	E. Stephan	667	28.2
Alliance	B. Pointon	663	27.9
Alliance	A. Shepherd	635	26.8
Alliance	C. Westgate	511	21.6
Turnout		~2,376	53.6
Registered electors		4,431	
Labour win (new boundaries)			
Labour win (new boundaries)			
Labour win (new boundaries)			

=== Lothingland ===
Lothingland (2 seats)
Party	Candidate	Votes	%
Conservative	D. Prettyman	978	46.0
Conservative	J. Paul	856	40.3
Independent	A. Brown	606	28.5
Labour	M. Hood	544	25.6
Turnout		~2,127	53.9
Registered electors		3,946	
Conservative win (new seat)			
Conservative win (new seat)			

=== Mutford ===
Mutford
Party	Candidate	Votes	%
Conservative	G. Farmiloe	375	69.8
Labour	L. Owen	162	30.2
Majority		213	39.6
Turnout		538	43.0
Registered electors		1,250	
Conservative win (new seat)			

=== Normanston ===
Normanston (3 seats)
Party	Candidate	Votes	%
Labour	P. Hunt	1,180	63.9
Labour	B. Hunter	1,166	63.1
Labour	J. Reynolds	1,106	59.9
Conservative	W. Harvey	667	36.1
Conservative	P. Browne	665	36.0
Conservative	E. Back	659	35.7
Turnout		~1,848	40.5
Registered electors		4,559	
Labour win (new seat)			
Labour win (new seat)			
Labour win (new seat)			

=== Oulton Broad ===
Oulton Broad (3 seats)
Party	Candidate	Votes	%
Conservative	M. Barnard	1,378	65.7
Conservative	A. Choveaux	1,348	64.2
Conservative	A. Leedham	1,315	62.6
Labour	G. Manuel	721	34.3
Labour	A. Manuel	681	32.4
Labour	P. Secker	658	31.3
Turnout		~2,099	41.5
Registered electors		5,059	
Conservative win (new boundaries)			
Conservative win (new boundaries)			
Conservative win (new boundaries)			

=== Pakefield ===
Pakefield (3 seats)
Party	Candidate	Votes	%	±%
Labour	A. Lark	1,134	39.6	
Conservative	M. Gallidoro	1,020	35.6	
Conservative	D. Porter	972	33.9	
Labour	A. Martin	935	32.6	
Labour	J. Spottiswoode	774	27.0	
Alliance	G. Carroll	710	24.8	
Alliance	R. Catchpole	473	16.5	
Alliance	R. Jenner	354	12.3	
Turnout		~2,864	59.2	
Registered electors		4,837		
Labour hold				
Conservative hold				
Conservative hold				

=== South Elmham ===
South Elmham
Party	Candidate	Votes	%
Conservative	M. Rose	523	71.4
Labour	J. Moore	209	28.6
Majority		314	42.8
Turnout		732	53.1
Registered electors		1,378	
Conservative win (new seat)			

=== Southwold ===
Southwold (3 seats)
Party	Candidate	Votes	%
Conservative	S. Simpson	1,223	39.9
Conservative	E. Hudson	1,023	33.4
Labour	A. Child	996	32.5
Conservative	H. Jones	929	30.3
Independent	J. Adnams	847	27.6
Labour	P. Swingewood	756	24.6
Independent	M. Mack	711	23.2
Labour	H. Snowdon	651	21.2
Turnout		~3,069	59.9
Registered electors		5,122	
Conservative win (new boundaries)			
Conservative win (new boundaries)			
Labour win (new boundaries)			

=== St. Margarets ===
St. Margarets (3 seats)
Party	Candidate	Votes	%
Labour	H. Chamberlain	1,062	48.2
Labour	R. Durrant	1,001	45.4
Labour	J. Cliney	953	43.2
Conservative	F. Chapman	694	31.5
Conservative	R. Anderson	665	30.2
Alliance	B. Coster	449	20.4
Turnout		~2,207	42.2
Registered electors		5,228	
Labour win (new boundaries)			
Labour win (new boundaries)			
Labour win (new boundaries)			

=== Wainford ===
Wainford
Party	Candidate	Votes	%
Conservative	G. Trotter	397	64.7
Labour	P. Thirtle	217	35.3
Majority		180	29.4
Turnout		614	49.8
Registered electors		1,233	
Conservative win (new seat)			

=== Whitton ===
Whitton (3 seats)
Party	Candidate	Votes	%
Labour	T. Chipperfield	1,229	66.9
Labour	H. Lay	1,182	64.3
Labour	M. Ayers	1,138	61.9
Conservative	J. Nice	608	33.1
Conservative	A. Pettitt	598	32.6
Turnout		~1,836	40.6
Registered electors		4,521	
Labour win (new seat)			
Labour win (new seat)			
Labour win (new seat)			
