= 1999 Waveney District Council election =

1999 English local government election

- 6 May 1999

All 48 seats to Waveney District Council 25 seats needed for a majority

	First party	Second party
Party	Labour	Conservative
Seats won	13	2
Seats after	38	5
Seat change	▼3	▲2
Popular vote	11,974	7,678
Percentage	50.7%	32.1%
Swing	▼0.6%	▲5.8%
	Third party	Fourth party
Party	Liberal Democrats	Independent
Seats won	1	0
Seats after	3	2
Seat change	▲1	Steady
Popular vote	2,777	1,292
Percentage	11.8%	5.5%
Swing	▼0.3%	▼4.8%
- Winner of each seat at the 1999 Waveney District Council election.
Control before election
Labour
Control after election
Labour

The 1999 Waveney District Council election took place on 6 May 1999 to elect members of Waveney District Council in Suffolk, England. This was on the same day as other local elections.

One third of the council was up for election and the Labour Party stayed in overall control of the council.

== Summary ==
=== Election result ===
1999 Waveney District Council election
Party	This election			Full council			This election		
Party	Seats	Net	Seats %	Other	Total	Total %	Votes	Votes %	+/−
Labour	13	▼3	81.3	25	38	79.2	11,974	50.7	–0.6
Conservative	2	▲2	12.5	3	5	10.4	7,578	32.1	+5.8
Liberal Democrats	1	▲1	6.3	2	3	6.3	2,777	11.8	–0.3
Independent	0	Steady	0.0	2	2	4.2	1,292	5.5	–4.8

== Ward results ==
Incumbent councillors standing for re-election are marked with an asterisk (*). Changes in seats do not take into account by-elections or defections.

=== Beccles Town ===
Beccles Town
Party	Candidate	Votes	%	±%
Labour	Jack Walmsley	789	37.8	
Independent	Christopher Scott	641	30.7	
Conservative	Peter Wilson	419	20.1	
Liberal Democrats	Nicholas Bromley	237	11.4	
Majority		148	7.1	
Turnout		2,086	35.5	
Registered electors		5,882		
Labour hold		Swing		

=== Beccles Worlingham ===
Beccles Worlingham
Party	Candidate	Votes	%	±%
Labour	Harold Ley*	738	50.1	
Conservative	Shirley Cole	533	36.2	
Liberal Democrats	Antony Tibbitt	201	13.7	
Majority		205	13.9	
Turnout		1,472	34.0	
Registered electors		4,327		
Labour hold		Swing		

=== Blything ===
Blything
Party	Candidate	Votes	%	±%
Conservative	Peter Aldous	450	64.9	
Labour	Jacqueline Wagner	243	35.1	
Majority		207	29.9	
Turnout		693	38.7	
Registered electors		1,790		
Conservative gain from Labour		Swing		

=== Bungay ===
Bungay
Party	Candidate	Votes	%	±%
Labour	Olive Parr*	757	54.3	
Conservative	Bernard Reader	473	34.0	
Liberal Democrats	Darren Ware	163	11.7	
Majority		284	20.4	
Turnout		1,393	36.5	
Registered electors		3,818		
Labour hold		Swing		

=== Carlton ===
Carlton
Party	Candidate	Votes	%	±%
Labour	Graham Gouldby*	881	50.3	
Conservative	Ronald Bell	540	30.9	
Independent	Reginald Allen	180	10.3	
Liberal Democrats	Andrew Thomas	149	8.5	
Majority		341	19.5	
Turnout		1,750	26.8	
Registered electors		6,527		
Labour hold		Swing		

=== Gunton ===
Gunton
Party	Candidate	Votes	%	±%
Labour	Rosemary Winterton*	826	45.8	
Conservative	Andree Gee	777	43.1	
Liberal Democrats	Graham Haworth	201	11.1	
Majority		49	2.7	
Turnout		1,804	35.7	
Registered electors		5,050		
Labour hold		Swing		

=== Halesworth ===
Halesworth
Party	Candidate	Votes	%	±%
Labour	Hayes Holzer*	832	68.0	
Conservative	Valerie Pulford	392	32.0	
Majority		440	36.0	
Turnout		1,224	32.7	
Registered electors		3,746		
Labour hold		Swing		

=== Harbour ===
Harbour
Party	Candidate	Votes	%	±%
Labour	Craig Robertson*	486	39.9	
Independent	Ruth Ford	471	38.6	
Liberal Democrats	Paul Meadez	156	12.8	
Conservative	William Holdridge	106	8.7	
Majority		15	1.3	
Turnout		1,219	30.1	
Registered electors		4,044		
Labour hold		Swing		

=== Kirkley ===
Kirkley
Party	Candidate	Votes	%	±%
Liberal Democrats	Andrew Shepherd	777	51.5	
Labour	Ernest Skepelhorn	571	37.8	
Conservative	Richard Gee	161	10.7	
Majority		206	13.7	
Turnout		1,509	34.5	
Registered electors		4,379		
Liberal Democrats gain from Labour		Swing		

=== Lothingland ===
Lothingland
Party	Candidate	Votes	%	±%
Labour	Alexander Thomson	702	48.6	
Conservative	Stephen Ames	564	39.0	
Liberal Democrats	Alan Howe	179	12.4	
Majority		138	9.6	
Turnout		1,445	29.6	
Registered electors		4,881		
Labour hold		Swing		

=== Normanston ===
Normanston
Party	Candidate	Votes	%	±%
Labour	Frank Jones*	728	73.1	
Conservative	May Reader	158	15.9	
Liberal Democrats	Breena Batchelder	110	11.0	
Majority		570	57.2	
Turnout		996	23.4	
Registered electors		4,264		
Labour hold		Swing		

=== Oulton Broad ===
Oulton Broad
Party	Candidate	Votes	%	±%
Labour	Jennifer Hinton*	828	45.7	
Conservative	Michael Partridge	815	45.0	
Liberal Democrats	Arnold Martin	167	9.2	
Majority		13	0.7	
Turnout		1,810	33.7	
Registered electors		5,364		
Labour hold		Swing		

=== Pakefield ===
Pakefield
Party	Candidate	Votes	%	±%
Labour	Malcolm Pitchers	989	59.9	
Conservative	Ian Baylis	507	30.7	
Liberal Democrats	Brian Howe	154	9.3	
Majority		482	29.2	
Turnout		1,650	30.2	
Registered electors		5,458		
Labour hold		Swing		

=== Southwold ===
Southwold
Party	Candidate	Votes	%	±%
Conservative	Peter Austin	1,199	60.3	
Labour	Raymond Breach	790	39.7	
Majority		409	20.6	
Turnout		1,989	39.2	
Registered electors		5,079		
Conservative gain from Labour		Swing		

=== St. Margarets ===
St. Margarets
Party	Candidate	Votes	%	±%
Labour	David Rouse*	979	68.4	
Conservative	Anne Mylan	297	20.8	
Liberal Democrats	Leslie Batchelder	155	10.8	
Majority		682	47.6	
Turnout		1,431	25.8	
Registered electors		5,549		
Labour hold		Swing		

=== Whitton ===
Whitton
Party	Candidate	Votes	%	±%
Labour	Ann Skipper	835	72.6	
Conservative	Barry Bee	187	16.3	
Liberal Democrats	Sandra Tonge	128	11.1	
Majority		648	56.3	
Turnout		1,150	26.6	
Registered electors		4,326		
Labour hold		Swing		
