= National Centre for Universities and Business =

Organisation in the United Kingdom

- Abbreviation: NCUB
- Predecessor: Council for Industry and Higher Education
- Headquarters: London
- Location: UK
- Chief Executive: Dr. Joe Marshall
- Chair: Paul Walker
- Website: www.ncub.co.uk

The National Centre for Universities and Business (NCUB) develops, promotes and supports collaboration between universities and business in the United Kingdom. NCUB is a trading name of the Council for Industry and Higher Education, a registered charity.

NCUB is headed by Dr Joe Marshall (Chief Executive) and Paul Walker (Chair). The body's Leadership Council has representation from the UK's businesses and universities.

== Predecessor ==
The Council for Industry and Higher Education (CIHE) was established in 1986 through the collaboration of James Prior, John Cassels and Pauline Perry. Perry, then the Chief Inspector of Schools at the Department for Education, had learned about an American organisation that brought businesses and universities closer together. Cassels, as Director General of the National Economic Development Office, believed in the power of partnership, while Prior was a recent Cabinet member and the newly appointed chairman of the GEC industrial conglomerate. Prior agreed to invite the heads of various businesses, universities and polytechnics to initial discussions to determine whether a partnership approach could address their common goals.

CIHE was registered as a charity and a private company limited by guarantee in 1997.

The council was funded by its member organisations and by external bodies, including universities and private companies. Each member organisation appointed one representative to the council, seven of whom served as trustees. Leading up to the 2013 reorganisation, the chairman of CIHE was Richard Greenhalgh.

== Formation ==
Sir Tim Wilson's review of university-business collaboration, published in February 2012, made 30 recommendations. One of them was that the CIHE should evolve to become the focal point of this collaboration as a membership charity. In response, and at the request of the Department for Business, Innovation and Skills, CIHE adopted the National Centre for Universities and Business (NCUB) trading name in 2013.

Following the announcement, the four UK research funding councils – through RCUK and the Technology Strategy Board (TSB) (now Innovate UK) – agreed to co-fund NCUB. The organisation was launched with an event at the BT Tower, where David Docherty and Richard Greenhalgh became NCUB's first CEO and Chairman, respectively.

As of 2026, NCUB is led by Dr Joe Marshall (Chief Executive) and Paul Walker (Chair). Walker succeeded the previous chair, Sam Laidlaw, in January of that year.
