= Gervais Rentoul =

British politician (1884–1946)

Member of Parliament for Lowestoft
- In office 15 November 1922 – 31 January 1934
- Preceded by: Edward Beauchamp
- Succeeded by: Pierse Loftus

Personal details
- Born: 1 August 1884
- Died: 7 March 1946 (aged 61)
- Party: Conservative
- Parent: James Alexander Rentoul (father)

Sir Gervais Squire Chittick Rentoul KC (1 August 1884 – 7 March 1946) was a British Conservative politician, barrister, magistrate and judge.

== Biography ==
He was the eldest son of Judge James Alexander Rentoul, M.P. for East Down 1890–1902, and his wife, Florence Isabella Young. James Rentoul was something of an eccentric and one contemporary newspaper reported of him that "no man, woman or child wished to see him return to East Down."

He was born in Plumstead and educated at the City of London School, the Royal University of Ireland and Christ Church, Oxford, where he obtained first class honours in Jurisprudence and was President of the Oxford Union Society.

While at Oxford he was active in the Oxford University Dramatic Society (OUDS). Among the stage roles he played was Angelo in Measure for Measure (1906) and Petruchio in The Taming of the Shrew (1907), a production including the professional actresses Lily Brayton as Katherine and her real-life sister Agnes as her character's sister, Bianca. After leaving Oxford he acted with the Old Stagers along with fellow barrister and OUDS alumnus C.W.Mercer, who subsequently acted as his best man.

In 1912, he married Christian Muriel Smart (b. 1884); they had one daughter, Sylvia (b. 1916) who married Ferenc Gallo. In 1924, he was Master of the Guild of Freemen of the City of London.

He was elected Conservative Member of Parliament for Lowestoft in the 1922 United Kingdom general election. He was founding chairman of the 1922 Committee (1923–1932) and Parliamentary private secretary to the Attorney general (1925–1929). He became a barrister and took silk in 1930, becoming Recorder of Sandwich. He was knighted in 1929 and resigned from Parliament in 1934 on becoming a Metropolitan Police magistrate.

He was portrayed on television by Robin Sachs in the play The Root of all Evil (1981), an episode of the Granada Television series Lady Killers, a dramatisation of the Seddon murder case in 1912 in which Rentoul had appeared for the defence.

== Selected publications ==
- Sometimes I Think (Hodder & Stoughton, 1940)
- This is My Case An Autobiography (Hutchinson, 1944)

== Notes ==
Parliament of the United Kingdom
Preceded by Sir Edward Beauchamp	Member of Parliament for Lowestoft; 1922–1934	Succeeded by Pierse Loftus
Political offices
Preceded by New post	Chairman of the 1922 Committee; 1923–1932	Succeeded by William Morrison
