= 2015 Waveney District Council election =

2015 UK local government election

Map of the results

The 2015 Waveney District Council election was held on 7 May 2015 to elect all 48 members of Waveney District Council in England. This was on the same day as other local elections.

Before the election, the Conservatives were one seat short of a majority, with 24 (exactly half) of the seats. Labour had 20 seats, the Green Party had one seat, two seats were held by independents and one seat was vacant.

Following the election, 27 seats were held by the Conservatives, 20 by Labour and one by the Green Party, giving the Conservatives a majority.

== Results summary ==
Waveney District Council election, 2015
Party	Seats	Gains	Losses	Net gain/loss	Seats %	Votes %	Votes	+/−
Conservative	27	4	0	▲4	56.2	40.9	48,803	+4.2
Labour	20	0	3	▼3	41.7	38.5	45,974	+7.0
Green	1	0	0	Steady	2.1	11.4	13,613	-2.7
UKIP	0	0	0	Steady	0.0	6.8	8,156	-1.7
Independent	0	0	1	▼1	0.0	1.5	1,756	-2.2
Liberal Democrats	0	0	0	Steady	0.0	0.8	1,010	-3.6
