= 1973 Waveney District Council election =

1973 English local government election

- 10 May 1973

All 57 seats to Waveney District Council 29 seats needed for a majority

	First party	Second party	Third party
Party	Labour	Conservative	Liberal
Seats won	27	22	5
Popular vote	40,067	38,352	6,531
Percentage	45.6%	43.7%	7.4%
	Fourth party	Fifth party
Party	Independent	Residents
Seats won	2	1
Popular vote	2,151	676
Percentage	2.5%	0.8%
Control after election
No overall control

The 1973 Waveney District Council election took place on 10 May 1973 to elect members of Waveney District Council in Suffolk, England. This was on the same day as other local elections.

This was the inaugural election to Waveney District Council following its formation by the Local Government Act 1972.

== Summary ==
=== Election result ===
1973 Waveney District Council election
Party	Candidates	Seats	Gains	Losses	Net gain/loss	Seats %	Votes %	Votes	+/−
Labour	51	27	N/A	N/A	N/A	47.4	45.6	40,067	N/A
Conservative	50	22	N/A	N/A	N/A	38.6	43.7	38,352	N/A
Liberal	10	5	N/A	N/A	N/A	8.8	7.4	6,531	N/A
Independent	8	2	N/A	N/A	N/A	3.5	2.5	2,151	N/A
Residents	1	1	N/A	N/A	N/A	1.8	0.8	676	N/A

== Ward results ==
Incumbent councillors standing for re-election are marked with an asterisk (*). Changes in seats do not take into account by-elections or defections.

=== Beccles: North ===
Beccles: North (2 seats)
Party	Candidate	Votes	%
Labour	G. Westwood	478	42.3
Conservative	D. Hartley	433	38.4
Labour	A. Hutchinson	411	36.4
Conservative	D. Wilson	334	29.6
Independent	J. Philps	218	19.3
Turnout		~935	46.0
Registered electors		2,032	
Labour win (new seat)			
Conservative win (new seat)			

=== Beccles: South ===
Beccles: South (4 seats)
Party	Candidate	Votes	%
Labour	R. Ellwood	1,075	42.3
Labour	C. Andrew	1,025	40.3
Labour	E. Crisp	989	38.9
Conservative	R. Marshall	932	36.7
Conservative	W. Lowe	913	35.9
Conservative	G. Haworth	901	35.5
Conservative	E. Gilbert	896	35.3
Labour	F. Moore	873	34.4
Turnout		~2,531	61.0
Registered electors		4,147	
Labour win (new seat)			
Labour win (new seat)			
Labour win (new seat)			
Conservative win (new seat)			

=== Blundeston ===
Blundeston (2 seats)
Party	Candidate	Votes	%
Liberal	P. Coleby	806	59.6
Conservative	J. Paul	547	40.4
Conservative	Lord Somerleyton	511	37.8
Turnout		~1,352	54.0
Registered electors		2,504	
Liberal win (new seat)			
Conservative win (new seat)			

=== Brampton ===
Brampton
Party	Candidate	Votes	%
Conservative	W. Trevitt	289	52.3
Labour	P. Thirtle	264	47.7
Majority		25	4.6
Turnout		551	57.0
Registered electors		966	
Conservative win (new seat)			

=== Bungay ===
Bungay (3 seats)
Party	Candidate	Votes	%
Liberal	D. Richardson	870	52.9
Liberal	P. Ellis	675	41.0
Conservative	A. Hood	654	39.8
Liberal	C. Francis	626	38.1
Conservative	I. Baldwin	476	28.9
Labour	A. Mayne	475	28.9
Conservative	H. Fuller	443	26.9
Labour	L. Spall	412	25.0
Labour	C. Scott	338	20.5
Turnout		~1,645	53.0
Registered electors		3,104	
Liberal win (new seat)			
Liberal win (new seat)			
Conservative win (new seat)			

=== Carlton Colville ===
Carlton Colville (2 seats)
Party	Candidate	Votes	%
Labour	R. Beales	493	54.6
Labour	R. Dyer	439	48.6
Conservative	E. Duncan	410	45.4
Conservative	G. Neville	381	42.2
Turnout		~903	36.1
Registered electors		2,500	
Labour win (new seat)			
Labour win (new seat)			

=== Halesworth ===
Halesworth (2 seats)
Party	Candidate	Votes	%
Labour	E. Leverett	506	39.6
Labour	H. Holzer	492	38.5
Conservative	J. Bennett	466	36.5
Independent	G. Richardson	455	35.7
Conservative	E. Griffin	352	27.6
Independent	F. Coby	81	6.3
Turnout		~1,277	49.0
Registered electors		2,605	
Labour win (new seat)			
Labour win (new seat)			

=== Holton ===
Holton
Party	Candidate	Votes	%
Conservative	R. Wykes-Sneyd	345	61.9
Labour	C. Leech	212	38.1
Majority		133	23.8
Turnout		557	54.0
Registered electors		1,025	
Conservative win (new seat)			

=== Ilketshall ===
Ilketshall
Party	Candidate	Votes	%
Conservative	A. Bartram	299	57.2
Independent	B. Mansfield	155	29.6
Independent	W. Gowing	69	13.2
Majority		144	27.6
Turnout		468	46.7
Registered electors		1,003	
Conservative win (new seat)			

=== Kessingland ===
Kessingland (2 seats)
Party	Candidate	Votes	%
Labour	J. Utting	585	55.7
Conservative	G. Farmiloe	466	44.3
Conservative	J. Hicks	370	35.2
Turnout		~1,052	38.7
Registered electors		2,719	
Labour win (new seat)			
Conservative win (new seat)			

=== Lowestoft: Carlton ===
Lowestoft: Carlton (6 seats)
Party	Candidate	Votes	%
Labour	S. Bostock	1,435	42.6
Labour	E. Meades	1,385	41.1
Labour	L. Davies	1,351	40.1
Labour	D. Durrant	1,342	39.8
Conservative	J. Scarles	1,311	38.9
Labour	T. Kelly	1,296	38.4
Labour	G. Mallett	1,270	37.6
Conservative	E. Stuckey	1,224	36.3
Conservative	D. Mellor	1,209	35.8
Conservative	G. Duffield	1,201	35.6
Conservative	M. Ison	1,187	35.2
Conservative	C. Smith	1,184	35.1
Liberal	R. Aitchison	625	18.5
Turnout		~2,854	37.5
Registered electors		7,613	
Labour win (new seat)			
Labour win (new seat)			
Labour win (new seat)			
Labour win (new seat)			
Conservative win (new seat)			
Labour win (new seat)			

=== Lowestoft: Central & Waveney ===
Lowestoft: Central & Waveney (3 seats)
Party	Candidate	Votes	%
Liberal	H. Sparham	851	41.0
Liberal	A. Shepherd	730	35.2
Residents	H. Kirby	676	32.5
Labour	B. Thompson	550	26.5
Labour	H. Porter	543	26.2
Labour	D. Baldwin	516	24.9
Turnout		~1,473	41.3
Registered electors		3,568	
Liberal win (new seat)			
Liberal win (new seat)			
Residents win (new seat)			

=== Lowestoft: Gunton ===
Lowestoft: Gunton (5 seats)
Party	Candidate	Votes	%
Conservative	D. Cullum	1,139	39.7
Conservative	N. Brighouse	1,126	39.3
Conservative	V. Beales	1,070	37.3
Conservative	J. Aldous	1,046	36.5
Labour	J. Bray	1,033	36.0
Conservative	P. Carroll	967	33.7
Labour	W. Holden	964	33.6
Labour	A. Milne	897	31.2
Labour	A. Jurd	894	31.1
Labour	N. Rimmell	878	30.6
Liberal	A. Moles	698	24.3
Turnout		~2,873	47.3
Registered electors		6,072	
Conservative win (new seat)			
Conservative win (new seat)			
Conservative win (new seat)			
Conservative win (new seat)			
Labour win (new seat)			

=== Lowestoft: Kirkley ===
Lowestoft: Kirkley (2 seats)
Party	Candidate	Votes	%
Labour	S. Ellis	871	53.2
Labour	C. Myhill	851	52.0
Conservative	M. Salmon	766	46.8
Conservative	R. Woollard	761	46.5
Turnout		~1,703	52.8
Registered electors		3,224	
Labour win (new seat)			
Labour win (new seat)			

=== Lowestoft: Oulton Broad ===
Lowestoft: Oulton Broad (5 seats)
Party	Candidate	Votes	%
Conservative	W. Wren	1,687	52.9
Conservative	R. Carter	1,648	51.7
Conservative	M. Barnard	1,602	50.2
Conservative	H. Turner	1,582	49.6
Conservative	A. Leedham	1,558	48.9
Labour	B. Hunter	1,505	47.1
Labour	R. Bryanton	1,292	40.4
Labour	D. Hadingham	1,216	38.1
Labour	S. McIntosh	1,205	37.7
Labour	G. Whatmough	1,171	36.7
Turnout		~2,997	41.5
Registered electors		7,220	
Conservative win (new seat)			
Conservative win (new seat)			
Conservative win (new seat)			
Conservative win (new seat)			
Conservative win (new seat)			

=== Lowestoft: Pakefield ===
Lowestoft: Pakefield (3 seats)
Party	Candidate	Votes	%
Labour	J. Lark	1,192	64.9
Labour	A. Martin	1,053	57.3
Labour	V. Wallace	976	53.1
Conservative	S. Neville	644	35.1
Conservative	W. Riches	639	34.8
Turnout		~1,813	42.4
Registered electors		4,271	
Labour win (new seat)			
Labour win (new seat)			
Labour win (new seat)			

=== Lowestoft: Roman Hill ===
Lowestoft: Roman Hill (2 seats)
Party	Candidate	Votes	%
Labour	P. Hunt	628	68.6
Labour	J. Plant	564	61.6
Liberal	C. Clarke	288	31.4
Turnout		~891	34.9
Registered electors		2,553	
Labour win (new seat)			
Labour win (new seat)			

=== Lowestoft: St. Johns ===
Lowestoft: St. Johns (2 seats)
Party	Candidate	Votes	%
Labour	T. Carter	593	60.9
Labour	P. Ramm	569	58.5
Conservative	M. Hinson	381	39.1
Conservative	H. Sabell	356	36.6
Turnout		~991	37.2
Registered electors		2,665	
Labour win (new seat)			
Labour win (new seat)			

=== Lowestoft: St. Margarets ===
Lowestoft: St. Margarets (2 seats)
Party	Candidate	Votes	%
Labour	M. Reynolds	639	46.8
Labour	A. Jeffreys	499	36.5
Conservative	H. Boyd	363	26.6
Liberal	R. Bowditch	362	26.5
Conservative	M. Pickering	350	25.6
Turnout		~1,214	47.5
Registered electors		2,554	
Labour win (new seat)			
Labour win (new seat)			

=== Reydon ===
Reydon (2 seats)
Party	Candidate	Votes	%
Labour	G. Harrison	775	56.6
Conservative	H. Kent	594	43.4
Conservative	J. Thomas	521	38.0
Labour	R. Stirling	432	31.5
Turnout		~1,369	60.2
Registered electors		2,273	
Labour win (new seat)			
Conservative win (new seat)			

=== Southelmham ===
Southelmham
Party	Candidate	Votes	%
Conservative	B. Sandeman-Allen	373	65.0
Labour	R. Gough	201	35.0
Majority		172	30.0
Turnout		574	63.7
Registered electors		1,017	
Conservative win (new seat)			

=== Southwold ===
Southwold (2 seats)
Party	Candidate	Votes	%
Conservative	G. Cockerill	605	56.4
Independent	A. Earle	467	43.6
Conservative	C. Amory	415	38.7
Independent	S. Hicklin	373	34.8
Turnout		~1,073	58.5
Registered electors		1,834	
Conservative win (new seat)			
Independent win (new seat)			

=== Worlingham ===
Worlingham
Party	Candidate	Votes	%
Conservative	N. Dodd	425	61.1
Labour	T. White	271	38.9
Majority		154	22.2
Turnout		696	49.0
Registered electors		1,423	
Conservative win (new seat)			

=== Wrentham ===
Wrentham
Party	Candidate	Votes	%
Independent	J. Gooch	333	70.0
Labour	K. Arnold	143	30.0
Majority		190	40.0
Turnout		476	49.3
Registered electors		965	
Independent win (new seat)			
