= Bob Blizzard =

British politician (1950–2022)

- Blizzard as an MP

Lord Commissioner of the Treasury
- In office 6 October 2008 – 11 May 2010
- Prime Minister: Gordon Brown
- Chancellor: Alistair Darling
- Preceded by: Claire Ward
- Succeeded by: Michael Fabricant

Member of Parliament for Waveney
- In office 1 May 1997 – 12 April 2010
- Preceded by: David Porter
- Succeeded by: Peter Aldous

Personal details
- Born: Robert John Blizzard; 31 May 1950 Bury St Edmunds, West Suffolk, England
- Died: 5 May 2022 (aged 71) Norfolk, England
- Party: Labour
- Education: University of Birmingham

Robert John Blizzard (31 May 1950 – 5 May 2022) was a British Labour politician who served as member of Parliament (MP) for the Suffolk constituency of Waveney from 1997 until 2010.

== Early life ==
Bob Blizzard was born on 31 May 1950 in Bury St Edmunds, West Suffolk, and was educated at Culford School in Bury St Edmunds and the University of Birmingham.

After his education, he became a teacher. In 1973, he became an English teacher at Southfields Secondary School in Gravesend, Kent. He was appointed the Head of the English Department at the Crayford School on Iron Mill Lane in the London Borough of Bexley in 1976. In 1986, he became the Head of English at the Lynn Grove High School in the Gorleston-on-Sea area of Great Yarmouth, Norfolk.

== Political career ==
Blizzard was elected as a councillor to Waveney District Council in 1987 and became its leader in 1991. He stepped down from the council on his election to Westminster.

He was selected to fight the Conservative-held seat of Waveney at the 1997 general election, which Labour won by a landslide.

Blizzard defeated the sitting MP David Porter by over 12,000 votes after receiving 56.25% of the vote, and he was elected as the first Labour MP for Waveney. He made his maiden speech on 10 June 1997.

From 1997 to 1999, he served on the Environmental Audit Select Committee. In 1999, he became the parliamentary private secretary (PPS) to Helene Hayman, Baroness Hayman as minister of state at the Ministry of Agriculture, Fisheries and Food.

After the 2001 general election, he became PPS to Nick Brown in Brown's role as minister for work at the Department for Work and Pensions. Blizzard resigned this position in March 2003 in protest at the Iraq War.

After the 2005 general election, Blizzard was appointed PPS to the Europe minister at the Foreign and Commonwealth Office, Douglas Alexander, and remained Alexander's PPS when his boss became Secretary of State for Transport in 2006.

In the reshuffle following Gordon Brown's appointment as prime minister in June 2007, he was promoted to the position of assistant whip.

Following Gordon Brown's October 2008 reshuffle, Blizzard was promoted from an assistant whip to a government whip, otherwise known as a Lord Commissioner of the Treasury.

Blizzard chaired several all-party parliamentary groups (APPGs), including the British Offshore Oil and Gas APPG (1997–2007), the Renewable Transport Fuels APPG (2007), the British-Brazilian APPG (1997–2007), the British-Chilean APPG (2005–2007), and the British-Latin America APPG (2004–2007). He also served as secretary of the Jazz Appreciation APPG (2004–2007).

The policy areas in which he had a special interest included energy, employment, health, transport, education and foreign affairs.

== Following 2010 election ==
With Labour's defeat in the 2010 election, Blizzard lost his seat. Subsequently, he produced a report which provided "an unflinching look at the bad results Labour suffered in the East, and ideas for how Labour can change its policies and the way it does business, to reclaim the ground it has lost".

== Reselection as Labour's candidate and 2015 election ==
On 21 October 2011, Blizzard was overwhelmingly selected as Labour's prospective parliamentary candidate by the Waveney Constituency Labour Party, winning the ballot on members' first preference votes. The selection set up a re-run of the 2010 election contest against Peter Aldous. Aldous held the seat with an increased majority, which ended Blizzard's political career.

== Death ==
Blizzard died in Norfolk on 5 May 2022. His funeral was held in Lowestoft on 28 May.

Parliament of the United Kingdom
Preceded by David Porter	Member of Parliament for Waveney; 1997–2010	Succeeded by Peter Aldous
Political offices
Preceded by Claire Ward	Lord Commissioner of HM Treasury; 2008–2010	Succeeded by Michael Fabricant
