= Peter Aldous =

British Conservative politician

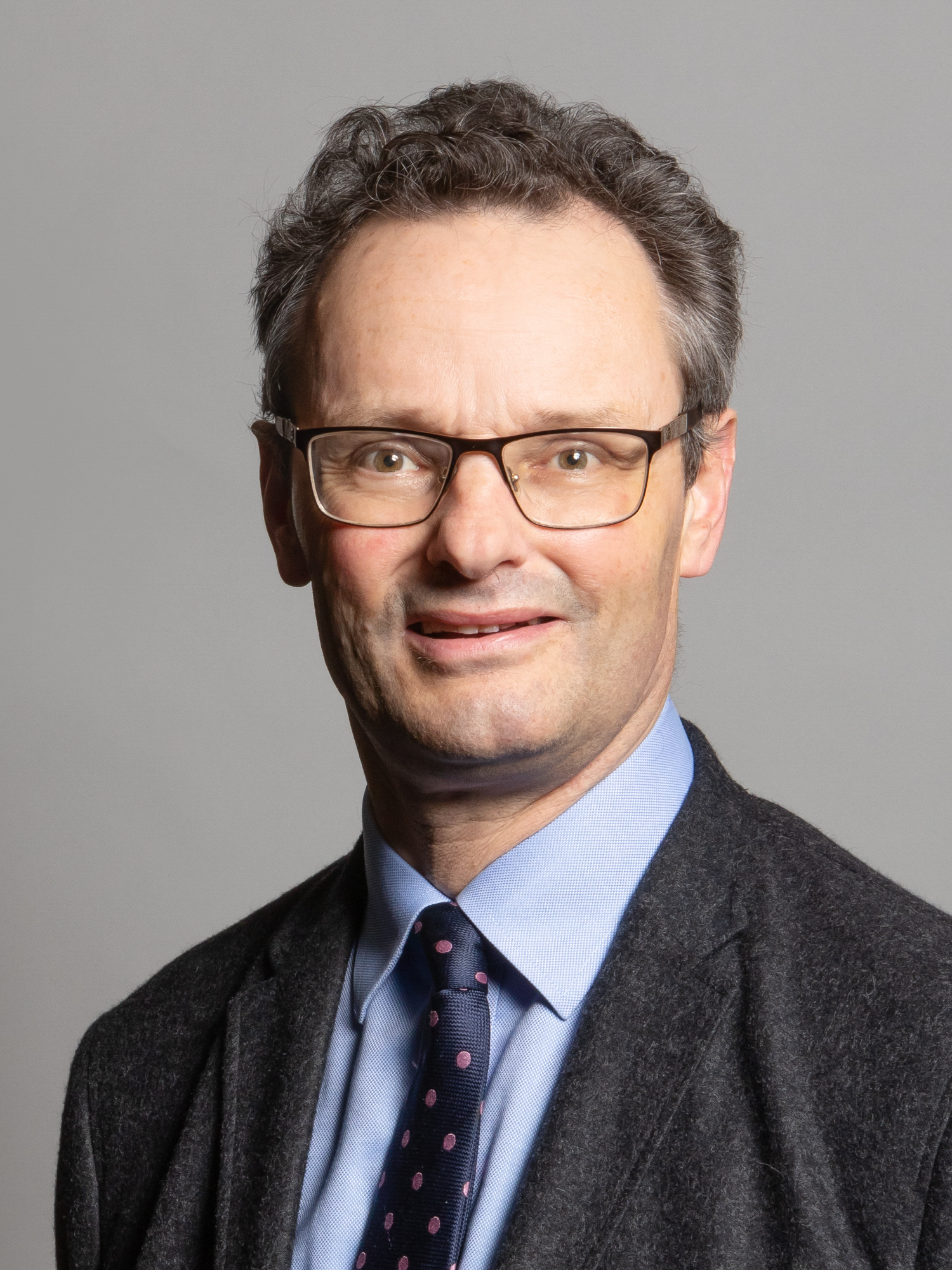
- Official portrait, 2020

Member of Parliament for Waveney
- In office 6 May 2010 – 30 May 2024
- Preceded by: Bob Blizzard
- Succeeded by: Constituency abolished

Suffolk County Councillor for Halesworth
- In office 7 June 2001 – 5 May 2005
- Preceded by: Paul Honeker
- Succeeded by: Wendy Mawer

Personal details
- Born: Peter James Guy Aldous; 26 August 1961 (age 65) Ipswich, Suffolk, England
- Citizenship: British
- Party: Conservative
- Education: Harrow School; University of Reading
- Profession: Chartered Surveyor
- Website: peteraldous.com parliament..peter-aldous

Peter James Guy Aldous (born 26 August 1961) is a British Conservative Party politician. He was the Member of Parliament (MP) for the Waveney constituency in Suffolk from the 2010 general election until its abolition in 2024.

== Personal life ==
Peter James Guy Aldous was born in Ipswich, Suffolk. He has lived in the north of the county for most of his life. His family own farms near Ipswich and the market town of Halesworth. He was privately educated at Harrow School and graduated from the University of Reading with a degree in Land Management in 1982.

Before his election Aldous was as a chartered surveyor in Norwich. He is a keen squash player. He supports Ipswich Town FC.

== Political career ==
Aldous was elected as a councillor to Waveney District Council in 1999, serving until 2002. He was a member of Suffolk County Council between 2001 and 2005 and was Deputy Leader of the Conservative Group from 2002 until 2005.

Aldous was selected to contest the 2005 general election as the Conservative Party candidate for Waveney, but lost to the sitting Labour Party Member of Parliament Bob Blizzard by a majority of 5,915. He contested the seat again at the 2010 general election, this time obtaining 40.2% of the overall vote and generating a 6.8% combined swing from Labour to Conservative, enough to win the seat by a majority of 769.

Aldous was opposed to Brexit prior to the 2016 referendum.

Aldous has been a critic of his party over the implementation of Universal Credit and has called for the abolition of the five-week wait for payments. In August 2021, Aldous and John Stevenson wrote to Prime Minister Boris Johnson to call on the government to keep the £20-a-week Universal Credit uplift. On 1 February 2022, Aldous called for the resignation of Prime Minister Boris Johnson and submitted a letter calling for a no-confidence vote. In the July–September 2022 Conservative Party leadership election he backed former Chancellor of the Exchequer Rishi Sunak, who lost to Liz Truss.

Parliament of the United Kingdom
Preceded by Bob Blizzard	Member of Parliament for Waveney; 2010–2024	Constituency abolished
