= Catherine Momand =

American heiress (1900–1977)

- Born: Anne Catherine Tredick Wendell; 25 November 1900
- Died: 1977 (aged 76 or 77)
- Spouses: Henry Herbert, 6th Earl of Carnarvon (m. 1922; div. 1936) Geoffrey Seymour Grenfell (m. 1938; died 1940) Don Stuart Momand (m. 1950; died 1977)
- Children: Henry Herbert, 7th Earl of Carnarvon; Lady Penelope van der Woude
- Parent(s): Marian Fendall; Jacob Wendell III
- Relatives: George Herbert, 8th Earl of Carnarvon (grandson); Barrett Wendell (uncle); Philippa Stewart, Countess of Galloway (sister)

Anne Catherine Tredick Momand (née Wendell, previously known as the Countess of Carnarvon and Mrs Geoffrey Grenfell; November 25, 1900 – 1977) was an American heiress and descendant of the Lee Family of Virginia who married into the British aristocracy.

== Early life ==
Catherine was born on November 25, 1900. She was the eldest daughter of Marian (née Fendall) Wendell (d. 1949) and Jacob Wendell III (d. 1911), of New York and Sandridgebury, Sandridge, Hertfordshire. Her maternal grandfather, Philip Richard Fendall III, was the grandson of Philip Richard Fendall I and Mary Lee, of the Lee family of Virginia. Her younger sister, Philippa Fendall Wendell, was the wife of Randolph Stewart, 12th Earl of Galloway. Her brothers were Jacob Wendell (who married Eileen V. Carr) and Reginald L. Wendell.

Her father, a Harvard graduate and Broadway actor, died of pneumonia shortly before he was to appear in the leading role in What the Doctor Ordered at the Astor Theatre. Her maternal grandfather was Union soldier, Philip Richard Fendall III, and her great-grandparents were Elizabeth Mary (née Young) Fendall and Philip Richard Fendall II, the District Attorney of the District of Columbia. Her paternal grandfather was Jacob Wendell of Jacob Wendell Co.

== Personal life ==
On 17 July 1922, Catherine was married to Lord Porchester at St Margaret's, Westminster. He was the son and heir of George Herbert, 5th Earl of Carnarvon and Almina Herbert, Countess of Carnarvon and upon his father's death on 5 April 1923, Henry became the 6th Earl of Carnarvon and Catherine became Countess of Carnarvon. Before their divorce in 1936, they were the parents of two children:

- Henry George Reginald Molyneux Herbert, 7th Earl of Carnarvon (1924–2001), who married Jean Margaret Wallop, daughter of Hon. Oliver Malcolm Wallop, in 1956.
- Lady Anne Penelope Marian Herbert (1925–1990), who married her second cousin, Capt. Reinier Gerrit Anton van der Woude, son of R.A.G van der Woude and Mary Wendell (daughter of Harvard professor Barrett Wendell) in 1945.

After their divorce, Lady Carnarvon married, as his second wife, Lt.-Cdr. Geoffrey Seymour Grenfell (1898–1940) in 1938. Geoffrey was a son of Riversdale Francis John Grenfell (son of Charles Seymour Grenfell) and Cecil Blanche (née Lubbock) Grenfell. Grenfell died in action during World War II just two years after their marriage.

Ten years after his death, she married Don Stuart Momand (d. 1977) in 1950, who had previously been married to Virginia Ten Eyck Rice (a daughter of William Lowe Rice).

Catherine Momand died in 1977.

=== Descendants ===
Through her son Henry, she was a grandmother of George Herbert, 8th Earl of Carnarvon, Henry "Harry" Herbert, and Lady Carolyn Herbert.

Through her daughter Penelope, she was a grandmother of Michael Gerrit van der Woude, David Anthony van der Woude, and Penelope Catherine Mary van der Woude.
