= Barrett Wendell Jr. =

American investment banker (1881–1973)

- Born: April 19, 1881; Boston, Massachusetts
- Died: June 3, 1973 (aged 92); Lake Forest, Illinois
- Education: Harvard University
- Employer: Lee, Higginson & Co.
- Spouse: Barbara Higginson
- Children: 3
- Parent(s): Barrett Wendell; Edith Greenough
- Relatives: Jacob Wendell (uncle); Catherine Herbert, Countess of Carnarvon (cousin); William Whitwell Greenough (grandfather)

Barrett Wendell Jr. (April 19, 1881 – June 3, 1973) was an American investment banker.

== Early life ==
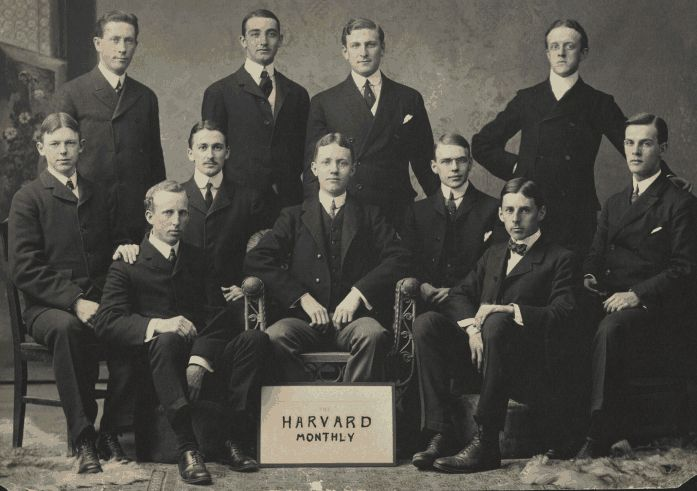
Wendell, as an editor of The Harvard Monthly 1902

Wendell was born on April 19, 1881, in Boston, Massachusetts. He was the eldest child of Edith (née Greenough) Wendell and Barrett Wendell, a well-known professor of English at Harvard. His mother was a national leader of movements to preserve historical sites. He had three younger siblings: Mary Barrett Wendell (wife of Geoffrey Manilus Wheelock and Reinier van der Woude), William Greenough Wendell (who married Ruth Appleton and Evelyn Fahnestock), and Edith Wendell (wife of publisher and Mayor of Auburn, New York Charles Devens Osborne).

His paternal grandparents were Jacob Wendell and Mary Bertodi (née Barrett) Wendell. His uncle was actor Jacob Wendell, father of Catherine Herbert, Countess of Carnarvon and Philippa Stewart, Countess of Galloway. His maternal grandparents were Catharine Scollay (née Curtis) Greenough and William Whitwell Greenough, the president of the Boston Public Library.

Wendell graduated from Harvard University in 1902, where he was on the varsity baseball team. For several years after graduation, he coached Harvard's team.

== Career ==
Wendell joined Lee, Higginson & Co. (which had been founded by his wife's grandfather in 1848). After the original firm dissolved, and the Lee Higginson Corporation was formed, was a part of their Chicago office, eventually leading it. He retired as a director of the corporation in 1965. In 1919, Wendell compiled the History of Lee, Higginson & Co., which remained unpublished.

He was a governor of the Investment Bankers' Association of America, an overseer of Harvard University and president of the Harvard Club of Chicago and of the Bond Club of Chicago.

== Personal life ==
On June 18, 1910, Wendell was married to Barbara Higginson (1884–1971), at St. John's Episcopal Church in Beverly Farms, Massachusetts. Barbara was the third daughter of Francis Lee Higginson and Julia (née Borland) Higginson and a niece of Henry Lee Higginson. Together, they were the parents of:

- Barbara Wendell (1911–2014), who Horace H. Soule of Boston in 1934. They divorced in 1938 and she married Chester Brooks Kerr in 1944. They also divorced.
- Barrett Wendell III (1913–1987), who married Margaret Mitchell, daughter of Leeds Mitchell, in 1937.
- Francis Lee Higginson Wendell (1916–1994), who married Camilla Alsop, daughter of Francis J. G. Alsop, in 1937. He later married Joan (née Monroe) Armour, the former wife of Charles Brooks Armour.

Wendell died on June 3, 1973, at Lake Forest Hospital in Lake Forest, Illinois.
