= Jacob Wendell =

American actor (1869–1911)

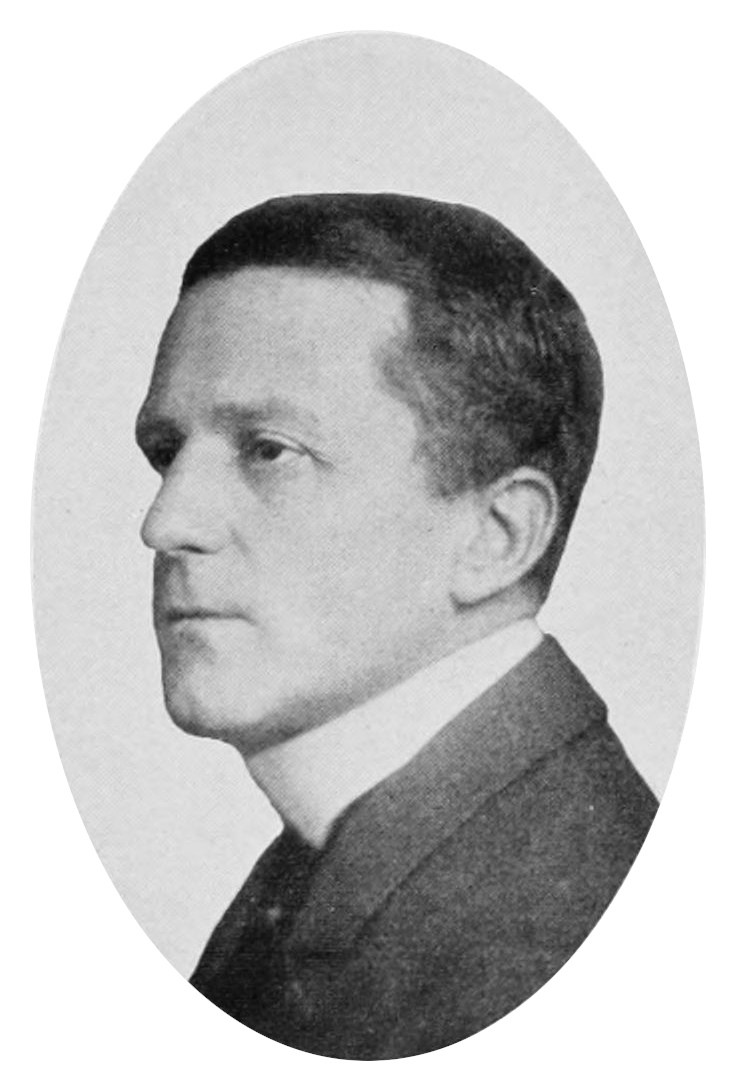
- Portrait of Wendell, by The New Theatre, 1909
- Born: Jacob Wendell III; April 13, 1869; Manhattan, New York
- Died: April 22, 1911 (aged 42); Manhattan, New York
- Education: Harvard University
- Spouse: Marian Fendall (m. 1895)
- Children: Jacob Wendell IV; Reginald Lee Fendall Wendell; Catherine Herbert, Countess of Carnarvon; Philippa Stewart, Countess of Galloway
- Parent(s): Jacob Wendell Jr. Mary Bertodi Barrett
- Relatives: Barrett Wendell (brother); Henry Herbert, 7th Earl of Carnarvon (grandson); Randolph Stewart, 13th Earl of Galloway (grandson)

Jacob Wendell III (April 13, 1869 – April 22, 1911) was an American actor who performed on Broadway.

== Early life ==
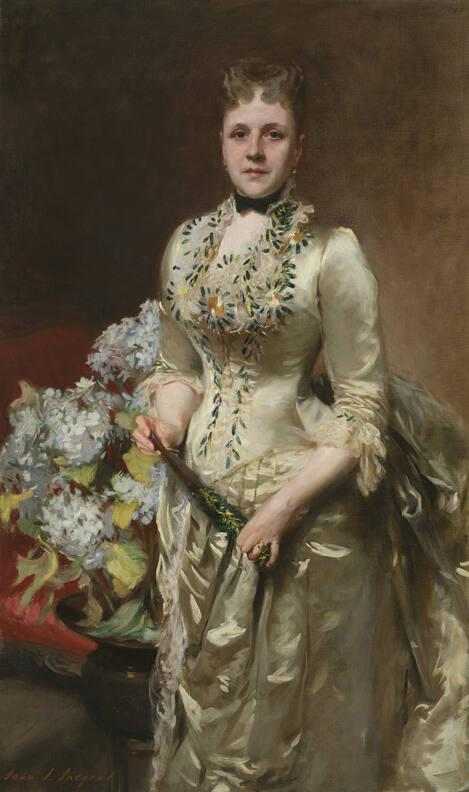
Portrait of his mother, Mary Barrett Wendell, by John Singer Sargent, 1888

Jake Wendell, as he was known, was born in New York City on April 13, 1869. He was the youngest son of Jacob Wendell Jr. (1826–1898) and Mary Bertodi (née Barrett) Wendell. His parents, who both came from wealthy families, married in Boston in 1854, about a year after his father had moved from Portsmouth, New Hampshire, and joined the firm of J.C. Howe & Co. His elder brothers were Harvard professor Barrett Wendell (father of Barrett Wendell Jr.), Gordon Wendell, and philanthropist and athlete Evert Jansen Wendell.

His paternal grandparents were Jacob Wendell Sr. and Mehitable Rindge (née Rogers) Wendell. The first Wendell, Evert Jansen, left the Netherlands in 1640 and settled in Albany, New York. Jake's maternal grandparents were Boston merchant Nathaniel Augustus Barrett and Sally (née Dorr) Barrett. Both the Barrett and Dorr families had deep roots in colonial America, with the Dorrs making their fortune in the fur trade.

He graduated from Harvard University in 1901, shortly after his father's death in 1898 from which he "received a comfortable fortune." He first attracted attention as an amateur athlete, then as an actor in the Hasty Pudding Club where "many critics of undergraduate drama declared that 'Jake' Wendell was the best amateur actor in the country."

== Career ==
After graduation from Harvard, he moved to New York and appeared in amateur efforts of The Strollers and the Comedy Club. After successfully playing many different roles, he was urged to join the opening of The New Theatre stock company. His first performance with the company was in Antony and Cleopatra and his second was that of the dog in Maurice Maeterlinck's The Blue Bird, which "brought him instant success."

In the Players', "Wendell found a place as a leading spirit of their hearth-fire gatherings, which were entertained by the hour with his droll yarns. He was a leading spirit in arranging the Actors' Fund Fair, and assisted in many other professional entertainments."

After suffering a nervous breakdown and a long period of ill-health, Wendell developed pneumonia and died shortly before he was to appear in the leading role in What the Doctor Ordered at the Astor Theatre.

== Personal life ==
In April 1895, Wendell was married to Marian Fendall (1870–1949), the daughter of Maj. Philip Richard Fendall III and Anne Catherine (née Tredick) Wendell. Her paternal grandfather was Philip Richard Fendall II (son of Mary Lee and Philip Richard Fendall I). They lived in his family's townhouse in New York City and spent time at "Frostfields", his wife's country house in New Castle, on the outskirts of Portsmouth, New Hampshire. Before his early death, they were the parents of four children:

- Jacob Wendell IV (1896–1963), who married Eileen Victoria Carr (1900–1983), a daughter of Philip Carr of London, in 1923.
- Reginald Lee Fendall Wendell (1898–1928), who died, unmarried, at Highclere Castle.
- Anne Catherine Tredick Wendell (1900–1977), who married Henry Herbert, Lord Porchester, son of George Herbert, 5th Earl of Carnarvon and Almina Herbert, Countess of Carnarvon, in 1922. Upon his father's death in 1923, Henry became the 6th Earl of Carnarvon and Catherine became Countess of Carnarvon. After they divorced in 1936, Catherine married Geoffrey Seymour Grenfell in 1938. He died in action in 1940 during World War II, and she married Don Stuart Momand in 1950.
- Philippa Fendall Wendell (1905–1974), who married Randolph Stewart, 12th Earl of Galloway in 1924.

Following a collapse on stage in Trenton, New Jersey the week prior, Wendell died of pneumonia at his home, 186 East 35th Street in Manhattan, on April 22, 1911. He was buried at Woodlawn Cemetery, Bronx. After his death, his widow moved to London to live with a cousin, also occupying a large country home at Sandridgebury, Sandridge, Hertfordshire. She died in London in December 1949.

=== Descendants ===
Through his daughter Catherine, he was a grandfather of Henry Herbert, 7th Earl of Carnarvon and through his daughter Philippa, he was a grandfather of Randolph Stewart, 13th Earl of Galloway.

=== Legacy ===
After his death, the Jacob Wendell Scholarship was established at Harvard in his honor.
