= Lee Corner =

Historic area of Alexandria, Virginia

Coordinates: 38°48′35″N 77°2′45″W

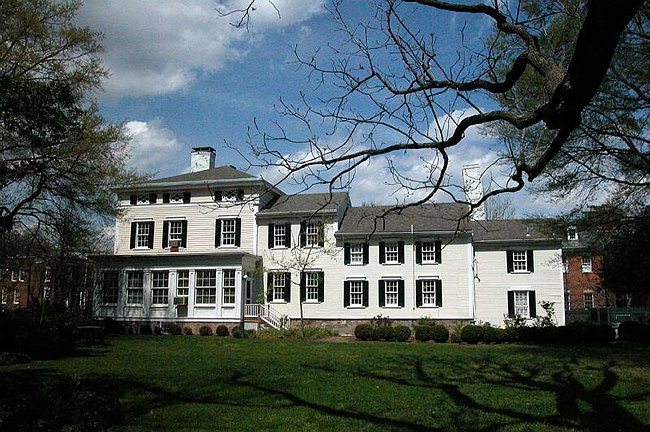
Lee–Fendall House

Lee Corner is a historic part of Old Town Alexandria, Virginia, at the intersection of North Washington and Oronoco Street. The corner is named after the Lee family, who once owned almost every property on the intersection. After the American Revolution, Alexandria, already known as "Washington's Home Town", also became known as the "Home Town of the Lees".

== Lee–Fendall House ==
The keystone of the corner is the Lee–Fendall House at 614 Oronoco Street. The property was originally owned by Col. "Light Horse Harry" Lee, and the original 1785 home was built by Philip Richard Fendall I. The house was home to 37 members of the Lee family, including Philip R. Fendall II, Edmund Jennings Lee I, and Harriotte and Louis Cazenove. It is currently operated as an historic house museum by the Virginia Trust for Historic Preservation.

== Robert E. Lee's Boyhood Home ==
Across Oronoco Street from the Lee–Fendall House stand twin houses: 607 and 609 Oronoco Street. 607 Oronoco Street was the last home of Light Horse Harry Lee. His son, Robert E. Lee (future Confederate General) spent most of his youth living at the house with his mother, Anne Hill Carter Lee (1773-1829), before he left for his education at West Point in 1825. The house is known today as the Robert E. Lee Boyhood Home.

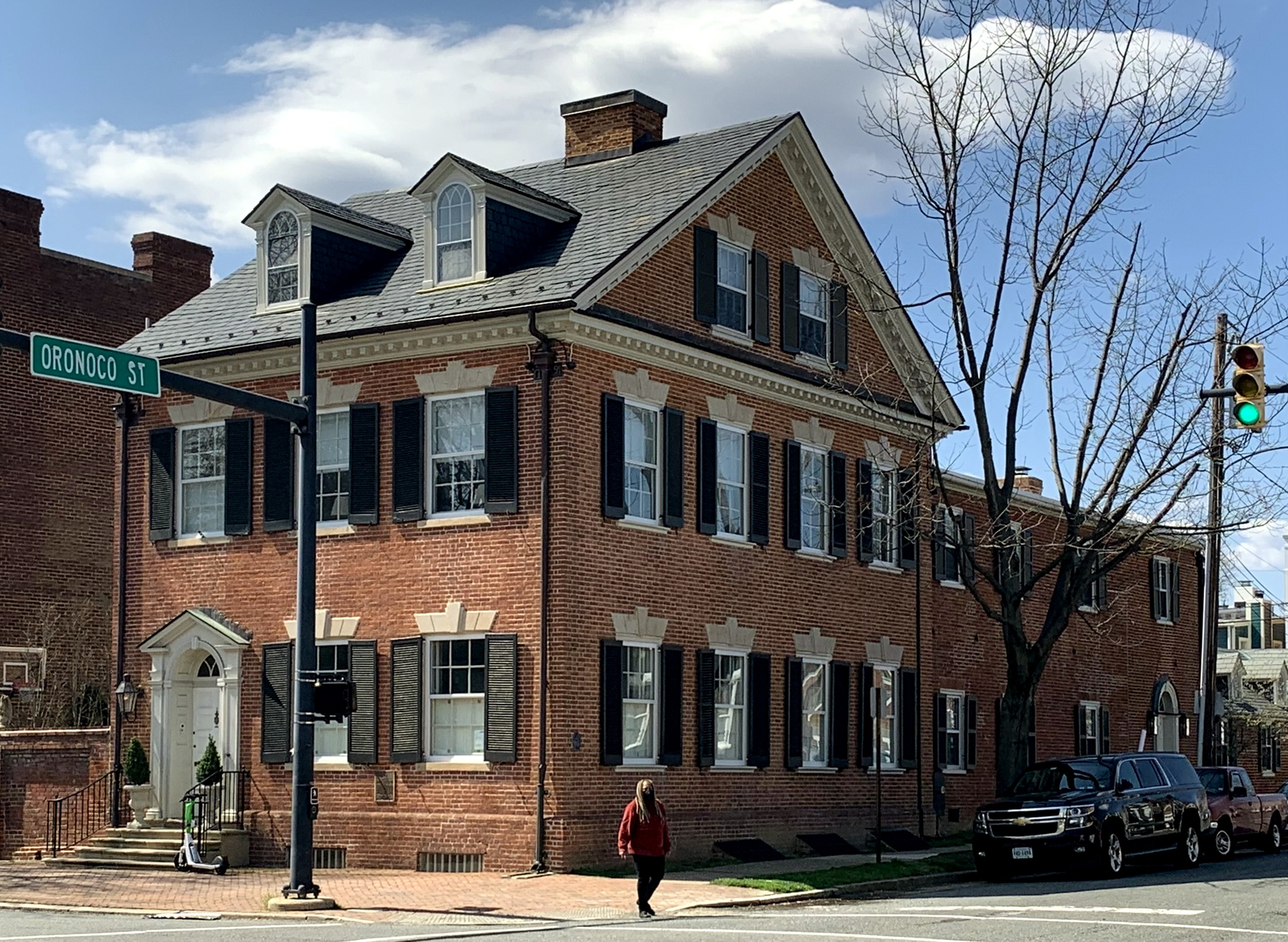
428 North Washington Street

Next door, 609 Oronoco, stands a mirror image of Lee's Boyhood Home. The house was home to Cornelia (Lee) Hopkins (1780-1818), daughter of William Lee (1739–1795), where she lived after her marriage to John Hopkins (1795-1873) until her death in 1816.

== 428 North Washington Street ==
428 North Washington Street is the house built by Edmund Jennings Lee I (1772–1843), younger brother of Harry Lee, who lived in the house from its 1801 construction until 1837, when he moved across the street to the Lee–Fendall House. Directly south of the Lee–Fendall House, on the corner of Washington and Princess, is the house built by U.S. Attorney General Charles Lee (1758–1815), another of Harry's brothers. Charles and Edmund married a pair of Lee sisters, Anne and Sally, the daughters of Richard Henry Lee (1732–1794), a signer of the Declaration of Independence. The Lee–Fendall House is the only Lee family house on Historic Lee Corner that is now a museum.

== See also ==
- Stratford Hall - home of four generations of the Lee family
