= James J. Higginson =

American stockbroker and surgeon (1836–1911)

- Born: June 19, 1836; New York City, New York, U.S.
- Died: November 11, 1911 (aged 75); New York City, New York, U.S.
- Occupations: stockbroker, soldier
- Spouse: Margaret Bethune Gracie

James Jackson Higginson (June 19, 1836 – November 11, 1911) was an American stockbroker and soldier who was imprisoned at Libby Prison for nine months during the Civil War.

== Early life ==
Higginson was born in New York City on June 19, 1836. He was a son of Boston merchant George Higginson and Mary Cabot (née Lee) Higginson. He was a brother of George Higginson, Jr., Henry Lee Higginson (who married a daughter of professor Louis Agassiz and founded the Boston Symphony Orchestra), Mary "Molly" (née Higginson) Blake (wife of Samuel Parkman Blake) and Francis Lee Higginson, Sr. (whose daughter Barbara married banker Barrett Wendell Jr.).

His maternal grandparents were Henry Lee and Mary (née Jackson) Lee. His paternal grandparents were George Higginson and Martha Hubbard (née Babcock) Higginson. He was also a cousin of historian Thomas Wentworth Higginson.

Higginson graduated from Harvard University with the class of 1857 and then studied law in Berlin but returned to the United States before the outbreak of the Civil War.

== Career ==
After the War, he started his career as a stockbroker and continued working until his retirement and the sale of his seat on the New York Stock Exchange in 1892. He worked for Lee, Higginson & Co., which had been founded by his father and John Clarke Lee in Boston in 1848.

He served as a vice president and a director of the Nome-Montana-New Mexico Mining Company, a trustee of the Greenwich Savings Bank, and a director of the Atchinson and Eastern Bridge Company. He was also a founding trustees of the Metropolitan Trust Company in 1881.

=== Military service ===
During the U.S. Civil War, he entered service for the Union Army as a Second Lieutenant of the 1st Massachusetts Cavalry Regiment. He was imprisoned at Libby Prison in Richmond, Virginia for nine months. A month after his release, he was brevetted a Major of Volunteers on April 9, 1863, but resigned his commission about a month later.

== Personal life ==
Higginson was married to Margaret Bethune Gracie (b. 1846), a daughter of Archibald Gracie Jr. and Elizabeth Davidson (née Bethune) Gracie. Margaret was a granddaughter of Archibald Gracie and a sister of Confederate Gen. Archibald Gracie III and James King Gracie (who married Anna Louisa Bulloch, sister of Martha Bulloch Roosevelt). Together, they were the parents of two sons and three daughters, including:

- Margaret Gracie Higginson (1872–1936), who married Clarence Stoughton Fiske in 1895.
- Elizabeth Bethune Higginson (1875–1974), who married Charles Cabot Jackson in 1909.
- Dorothy Lee Higginson (1878–1957), who married Arthur Delano Weekes Jr.
- James Jackson Higginson Jr. (1884–1930), who married Virginia Lucy Mitchell, a daughter of Clarence B. Mitchell, in 1919.
- Thomas Lee Higginson (1887–1906), who died young.

He was a president of the Eye and Ear Infirmary, president of the Harvard Club, and a member of the Century Association, the City Club, the University Club and the Riding Club.

Higginson died of pneumonia at 16 East 41st Street, his residence in New York City, on November 11, 1911.
