= William Whitwell Greenough =

American merchant (1818–1899)

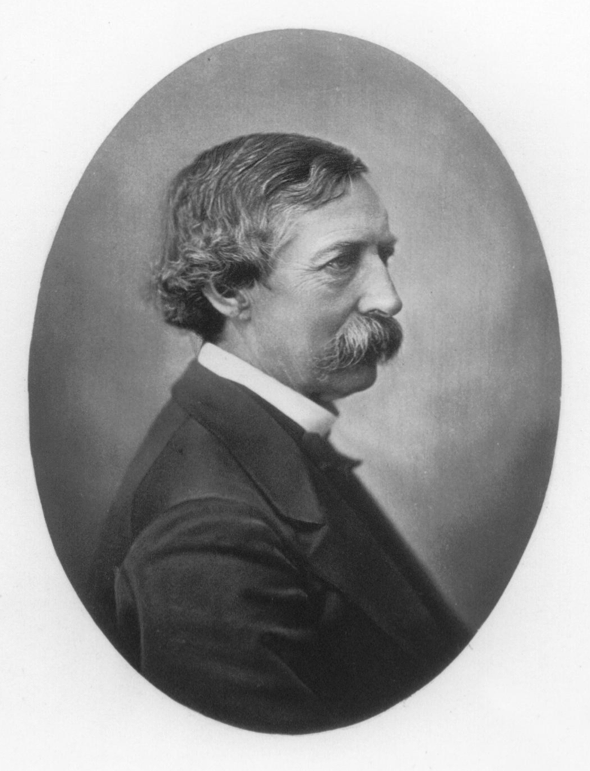
- Born: June 25, 1818; Boston, Massachusetts
- Died: June 17, 1899 (aged 80); Boston, Massachusetts
- Education: Harvard University
- Spouse: Catharine Scollay Curtis
- Children: 6
- Parent(s): William Greenough; Sarah Gardner
- Relatives: Barrett Wendell Jr. (grandson)

Signature
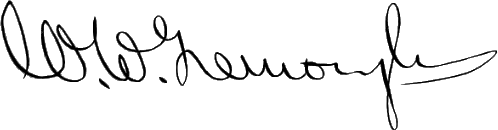

William Whitwell Greenough (June 25, 1818 – June 17, 1899) was an American merchant who served as president of the Boston Public Library from 1868 to 1888.

== Early life ==
Greenough was born in Boston, Massachusetts on June 25, 1818. He was the only son of prominent Boston merchant William Greenough (1792–1882) and Sarah (née Gardner) Greenough (1798–1882).

His paternal grandfather was the Rev. William Greenough, pastor of the church in Newton, Massachusetts. His maternal grandparents were John Gardner and Elisabeth (née Greenleaf) Gardner (a daughter of Gen. William Greenleaf and Sarah Quincy, herself a daughter of Edmund Quincy and sister to Dorothy Quincy, wife of John Hancock).

Greenough was educated at the Boston Latin School and at the private school of F. P. Leverette before entering Harvard University with the freshman class in 1833. He took courses at Andover and, reportedly, wanted to an Oriental scholar but, instead, joined his father's hardware firm at 14 Merchants Row in 1838.

== Career ==
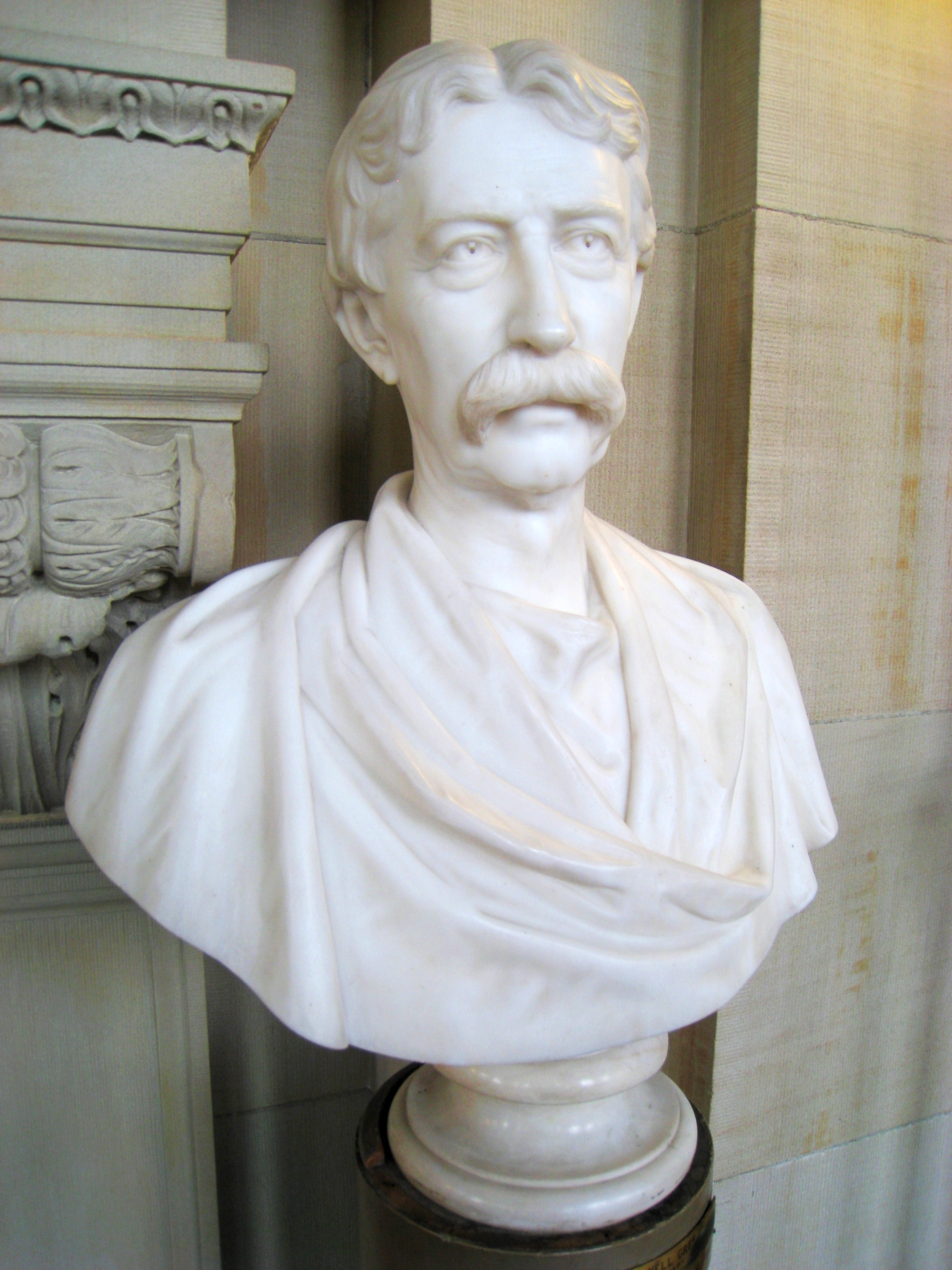
Bust of William Whitwell Greenough, by Richard Saltonstall Greenough, 1889

In 1840, he was admitted as a partner in his father's firm and traveled to Baltimore with the Boston delegation to attend the ratification meeting of the nomination of General Harrison for the presidency." He first went to Europe in December 1840, returning home in April 1841. In 1843, 1845 and 1847, he traveled extensively in the West for business.

In 1847, Greenough became a member of the Boston Common Council. In 1852, he became made agent to the Boston Gas-Light Company, becoming treasurer of the company in 1853. In 1857, he became a trustee of the Provident Institution for Savings, serving until his death in 1889.

He was a member of the American Oriental Society, Le Société Orientale of Paris, the Massachusetts Historical Society, the Rhode Island Historical Society, and the New England Historic Genealogical Society. In 1856, he was appointed a trustee of the Boston Public Library and was elected its president in 1868, serving for twenty-two years until his retirement in 1888. He was also a Trustee of the Boston Museum of Fine Arts.

== Personal life ==
On June 15, 1841, Greenough was married to Catharine Scollay Curtis (1821–1899), a daughter of Hon. Charles Pelham Curtis and Anna Wroe (née Scollay) Curtis. She was a first cousin of the well-known lawyer and banker Daniel Sargent Curtis who owned the Palazzo Barbaro in Venice. Together, they were the parents of six children, four of whom survived infancy:

- William Greenough (1843–1902), president of the Waterloo Woolen Manufacturing Company who married Alice Mary Patterson.
- Charles Pelham Greenough (1844–1924), a lawyer who married Mary Dwight Vose, daughter of Henry Vose, an Associate Justice of the Supreme Court of Massachusetts, in 1874.
- Malcolm Scollay Greenough (1848–1932), a member of the Boston Common Council in 1879 and alderman in 1884; he married Lizzie Tiffany, daughter of P. Dexter Tiffany, in 1872.
- Edith Greenough (1859–1938), who married Harvard professor Barrett Wendell.

In 1864 he bought the "old Greenleaf estate in Quincy" where he replaced the original house and spent most his time.

Greenough died at his home at 229 Marlborough Street in Back Bay, Boston on June 17, 1899. His widow died a few months later at Mattapoisett in September 1899.

=== Legacy ===
His son-in-law published his memoir, entitled Memoir of William Whitwell Greenough in 1901.
