= Philippa Stewart, Countess of Galloway =

The Right Honourable The Countess of Galloway
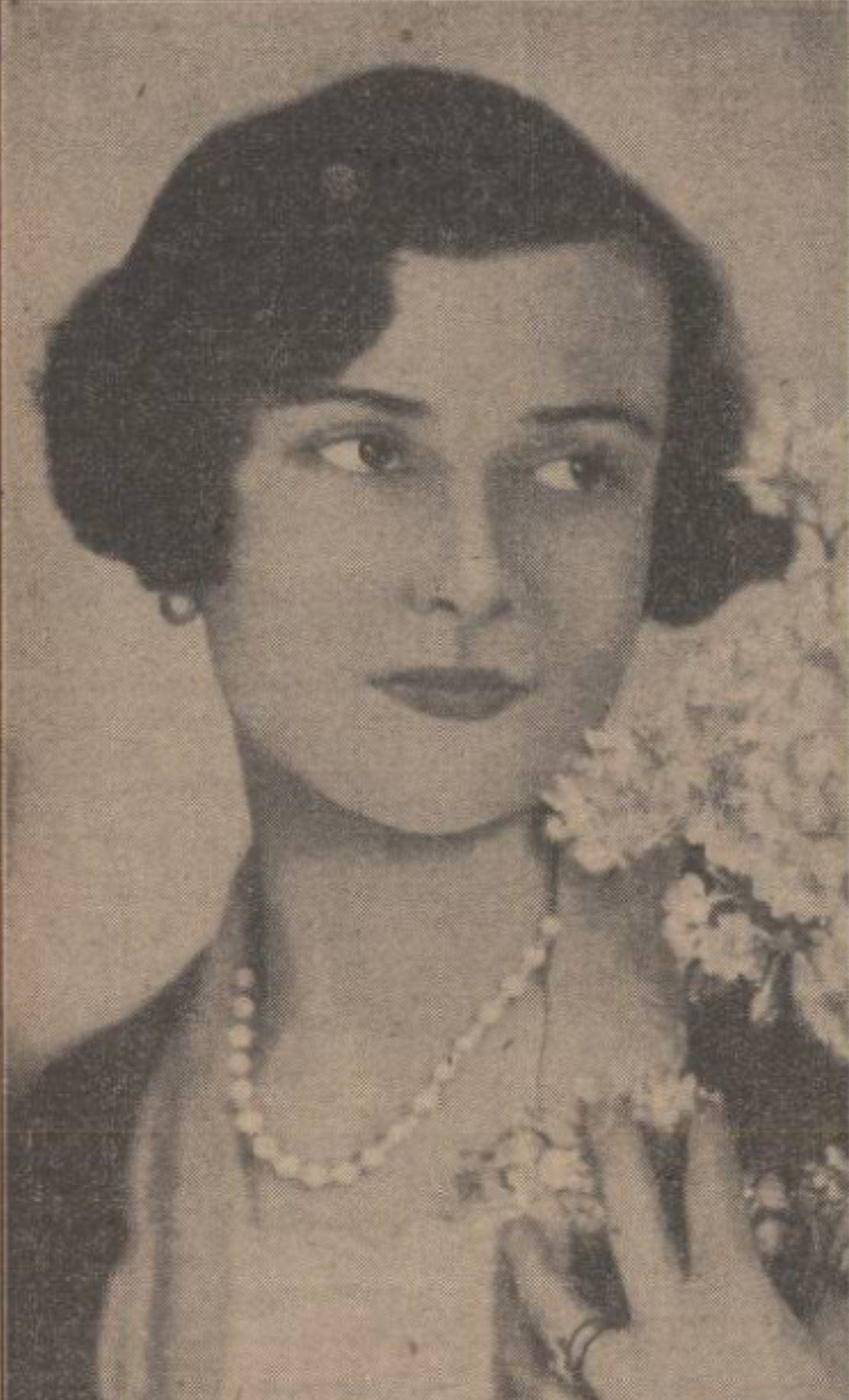
- c. 1931
- Born: Philippa Fendall Wendell; June 24, 1905
- Died: February 22, 1974 (aged 68); Dumfries, Scotland
- Spouse: Randolph Stewart, 12th Earl of Galloway (m. 1924)
- Children: Lady Antonia Dalrymple; Randolph Stewart, 13th Earl of Galloway
- Parent(s): Marian Fendall; Jacob Wendell III
- Relatives: Catherine Herbert, Countess of Carnarvon (sister); Barrett Wendell (uncle)

Philippa Stewart, Countess of Galloway (née Philippa Fendall Wendell) (June 24, 1905 – February 2, 1974), was an American heiress who married into the Scottish aristocracy. She was also a descendant of Philip Lee, a member of the Lee family of Virginia.

== Early life ==
Philippa was born on June 24, 1905. She was the second daughter of Marian (née Fendall) Wendell (d. 1949) and Jacob Wendell III (d. 1911), of New York and Sandridgebury, Sandridge, Hertfordshire. Her elder sister, Catherine Wendell, was the first wife of Henry Herbert, 6th Earl of Carnarvon. Her brothers were Jacob Wendell (who married Eileen V. Carr) and Reginald Lee Wendell.

Her father, a Harvard graduate and Broadway actor, died of pneumonia shortly before he was to appear in the leading role in What the Doctor Ordered at the Astor Theatre. Her maternal grandfather was Union soldier, Philip Richard Fendall III, and her great-grandparents were Elizabeth Mary (née Young) Fendall and Philip Richard Fendall II, the District Attorney of the District of Columbia. Her paternal grandfather was the prominent merchant Jacob Wendell of Jacob Wendell Co.

== Personal life ==
On 14 October 1924, Philippa married Randolph Stewart, 12th Earl of Galloway at St Margaret's, Westminster. Randolph, the only son of Amy Mary Pauline Cliffe and Randolph Stewart, 11th Earl of Galloway, was educated at Harrow and the Royal Military College, Sandhurst before serving with the Scots Guards during World War I. Randolph and Philippa had the following children:

- Lady Antonia Marian Amy Isabel Stewart (1925–2017), who married Mark Dalrymple, 3rd Baronet of New Hailes.
- Randolph Keith Reginald Stewart, 13th Earl of Galloway (1928–2020), who married Lily May Budge, from a working-class family from Duns.

The Galloway family seat was Cumloden House, near Newton Stewart, Dumfries and Galloway. Before her marriage to Lord Galloway, the family had sold Galloway House, near Garlieston, in 1908. The countess was president of the Stewartry, Kirkcudbrightshire, branch of the British Red Cross Society for many years.

Lady Galloway died at Dumfries Infirmary on 22 February 1974. Lord Galloway died on 13 June 1978 at which time he was succeeded in his titles by their son, Randolph. On his death, the earldom and other titles passed to her husband's second cousin once removed, Andrew Clyde Stewart, a great-great-grandson of the 9th Earl.
