= Lee–Fendall House =

Historic house in Alexandria, Virginia, United States

- U.S. National Register of Historic Places
- Virginia Landmarks Register
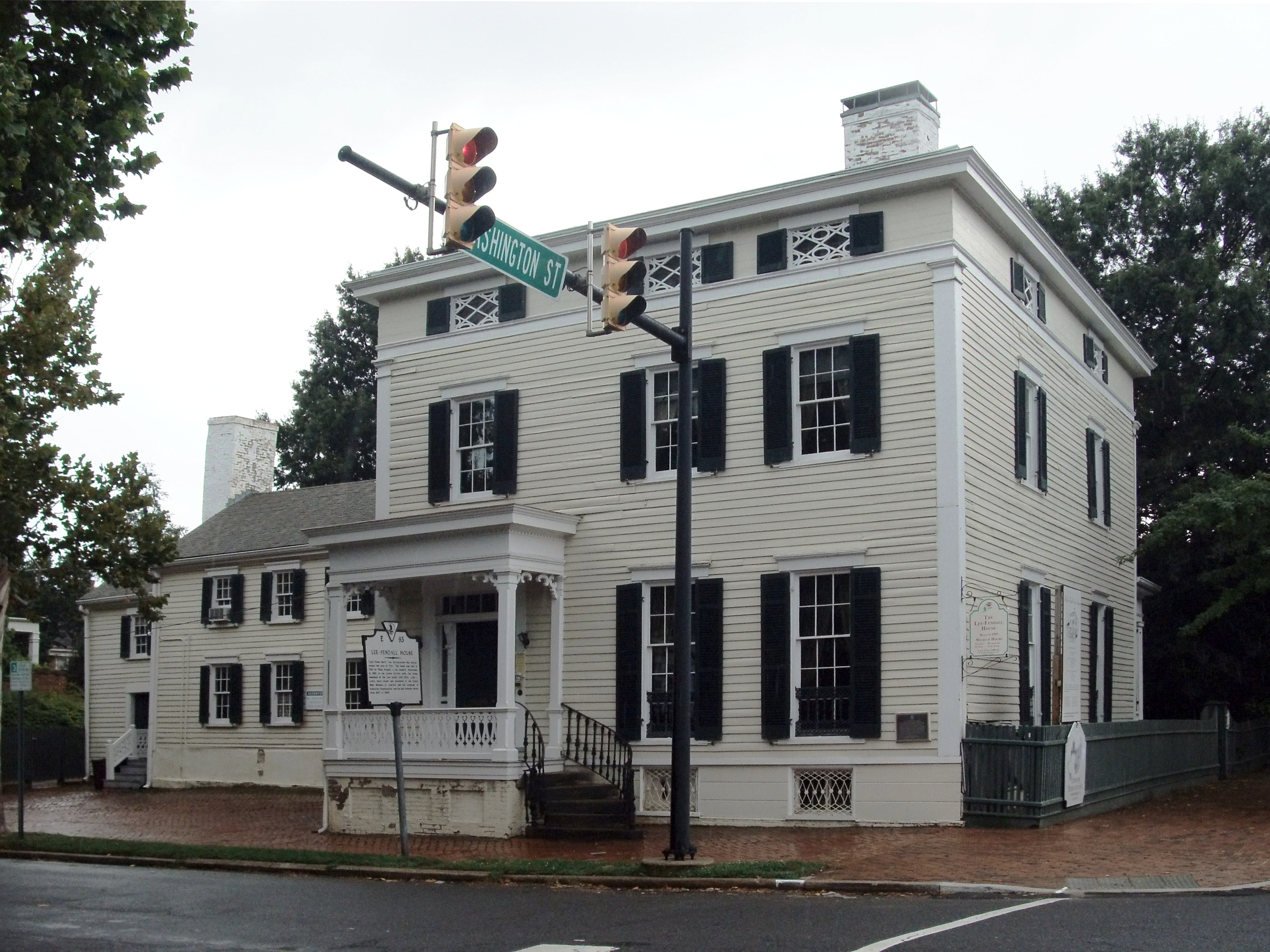
- The Lee–Fendall House, seen in September 2009

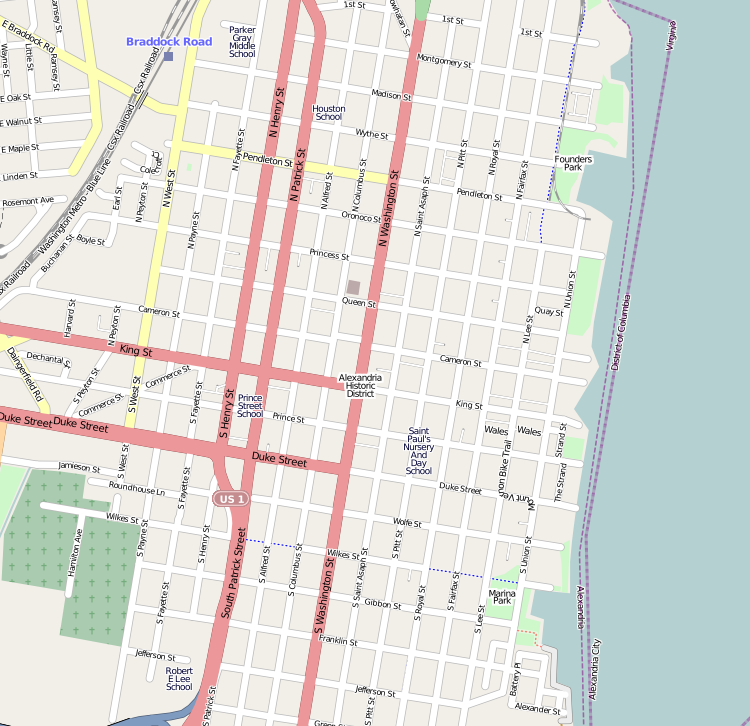
- Location within Alexandria Historical District Location within Alexandria Location within Northern Virginia Location within Virginia Location within the United States
- Location: 614 Oronoco Street, Alexandria, Virginia
- Coordinates: 38°48′33″N 77°2′46″W
- Area: 0.5 acres (0.20 ha)
- Built: 1785
- Architectural style: Greek Revival
- NRHP reference No.: 79003277
- VLR No.: 100-0024

Significant dates
- Added to NRHP: June 22, 1979
- Designated VLR: April 17, 1979

Fendall family coat of arms

The Lee–Fendall House is a historic house museum and garden located in Old Town Alexandria, Virginia, United States, at 614 Oronoco Street. Since its construction in 1785, the house has served as home to thirty-seven members of the Lee family (1785–1903), hundreds of convalescing Union soldiers (1863–1865), the prominent Downham family (1903–1937), the family of powerful labor leader John L. Lewis (1937–1969), and enslaved or free servants of those families.

The 1785 house, standing on its original half-acre lot, is in the vernacular "telescopic style" of architecture similar to many Maryland homes, but rare in northern Virginia (see below). The house was renovated in 1850, adding Greek Revival and Italianate elements to the original structure.

The historic home is listed on the National Register of Historic Places for state significance and the Virginia Landmarks Register, and is a documented contributing feature to the National Historic Landmark District of Alexandria, Virginia.

The property is now owned and operated by the Virginia Trust for Historic Preservation. It is run as the Lee–Fendall House Museum and Garden, providing exhibits, tours, and special programs.

== Home of the Lees ==
=== Construction ===
In November 1784, former Lieutenant Colonel (later Major General, Senator, and Governor of Virginia) Henry "Light Horse Harry" Lee III purchased three one-half acre lots in Alexandria from Baldwin Dade, a merchant. On December 4, 1784, Lee sold one of these tracts to his father-in-law Philip Richard Fendall I, Esq., for three hundred pounds. Fendall, using enslaved laborers, began building the Lee–Fendall House (for much of its life called the Phillip Fendall House), for his second wife, Elizabeth (Steptoe) Lee, in the spring or early summer of 1785. The lot was located on the Southeast corner of Washington and Oronoco Street, then the edge of the city. At the time, very few structures were near, and the Fendalls had uninterrupted views of Oronoco Bay and the ships which docked there. To the north and west lay verdant fields of grass and clover. Alexandria was an up-and-coming social and political center in Northern Virginia. The architect is unknown, but the style is similar to that found at "Hard Bargain", an estate built by the Digges family, and located in Charles County, Maryland, from which Fendall hailed. It consisted of a "telescopic" design, which was synonymous with Maryland, and had three sections. A plat on a 1796 insurance policy shows eight buildings on the quarter block, valued at a total of $11,500, including an office, a two-story dwelling (probably for enslaved workers), a rabbit house, and a pigeon house. The main dwelling house was valued at $5,000. It is probable the grounds also included a small kitchen and an herb garden.

The house was completed by November 1785, when George Washington wrote in his diary dated November 10, 1785: "Went up to Alexandria to meet the Directors of the Potomack Company and dined at Mr. Fendall's (who was from home) and returned in the evening with Mrs. Washington." The Fendalls are mentioned in Washington's 1785-1786 diaries more than anyone outside his own family, and Washington dined there at least seven times in those years. Elizabeth was a favorite of George and Martha Washington, a frequent visitor to Mount Vernon, and frequent hostess to the Washingtons. Philip was one of the few men who were close friends with Washington and participated in his social coterie.

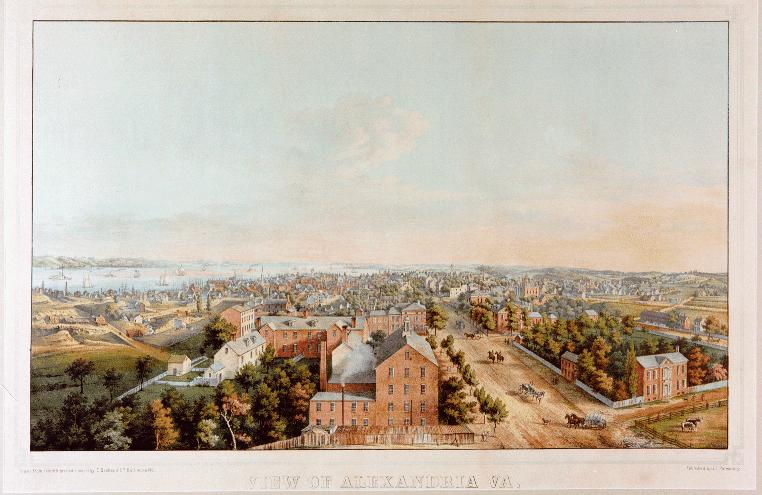
View of Alexandria, Virginia in 1845, an 1853 lithograph by E. Sasche & Company, Baltimore

After the American Revolution, Alexandria, already known as "Washington's Home Town", became known also as the "Home Town of the Lees". At "Lee Corner", the intersection of Washington and Oronoco Streets, stands the "Keystone", the Lee–Fendall House (formerly addressed as 429 North Washington Street). North across Oronoco are twin houses: 609 Oronoco, where Cornelia (Lee) Hopkins, daughter of William Lee, lived after her marriage to John Hopkins until her death in 1816, and 607 Oronoco, the last home of Light Horse Harry Lee, and known to the public as "Robert E. Lee's Boyhood Home". Just across Washington Street to the West (#428) is the house built by Edmund Jennings Lee I, younger brother of Harry Lee. Directly South of the Lee–Fendall House, on the corner of Washington and Princess, is the house built by Hon. Charles Lee, Attorney General, another of Harry's brothers. Charles and Edmund married Lee sisters, Anne and Sally, daughters of Richard Henry Lee. The Lee–Fendall House is the only Lee family house on Historic Lee Corner that is presently a museum.

=== Phillip R. Fendall and Henry Lee III families ===
The Fendall's, through Elizabeth's first marriage to Phillip Ludwell Lee Sr., had been living at Stratford Hall before moving to Alexandria. They had surrendered its proprietorship to Henry Lee III and his wife. Though continuing to live at Stratford Hall, Light-Horse Harry Lee spent a great deal of time with his relatives at the Fendall home in Alexandria. Philip R. Fendall was Harry's cousin and Mrs. Fendall (Philip's second wife), Elizabeth (Steptoe) Lee, was Harry's mother-in-law. Matilda Lee was devoted to her mother, and many of Harry's letters are datelined "Alexandria", indicating he was at 614 Oronoco. Also Washington's diary includes several entries about going to Alexandria and dining at Mr. Fendall's to meet Colonel Lee who had led Lee's Legion (2nd Partisan Corps), a renowned cavalry unit, within Washington's Continental Army during the Revolutionary War. Both Mrs. Fendall and Matilda were in failing health in 1788, and the Lees spent the winter of 1788–1789 with the Fendalls. Harry Lee was still at the house in April 1789, when George Washington left Virginia to become the first President of the United States. Col. Dennis Ramsay, Mayor of Alexandria, asked Lee to write the farewell address for the first President, which the Mayor delivered at a dinner held for Washington by his fellow citizens on April 16 at Wise's Tavern (201 North Fairfax Street). A decade later, in December 1799, Harry Lee was a U.S. Senator in Congress when Washington died. The Senate asked Lee to write the eulogy for the first President. It was in that speech that he penned the famous description of George Washington as "first in war, first in peace, and first in the hearts of his countrymen." After Washington's death a large group of citizens met at Lee–Fendall House to make arrangements for Alexandria's participation in his funeral rites.

Phillip Fendall was financially and politically well-placed after the Revolutionary War. He was Secretary to his friend Washington's Potomac Company, first President of the Bank of Alexandria, and an investor in land. His Lee relatives also had prominent places in local, state, and national governments while several made their homes in Alexandria. This prosperity did not last, as with many land speculators of the period, both Fendall and Harry Lee were impoverished and imprisoned for their debts. Due to these problems the house was deeded over to Richard Bland Lee, Harry Lee's younger brother, in 1792.

Elizabeth Fendall lived in the Lee–Fendall House from 1785 until her death in June 1789 probably from cancer. She died unexpectedly while on a trip that was to include a visit to her daughter Matilda at Stratford Hall. Matilda's husband Harry Lee wrote to James Madison, Jr.: "You have heard of the loss we have met with in the death of Mrs. Fendall - better for her to be sure had this event taken place sooner & altho' we are convinced of this truth yet our affliction is immoderate. Poor Mrs. Lee is particularly injured by it, as the affliction of mind adds to the infirmity of her body." Matilda was prostrated by the loss of her mother and the Lees remained in Alexandria many weeks after the funeral.

In 1791, Fendall married for a third time to Harry's sister, Mary "Mollie" Lee. He was now related to Light-Horse Harry Lee in three ways: as his cousin, step-father-in-law, and brother-in-law. Fendall died in 1805, but Mary Lee Fendall continued to live in the house with her two children, Philip Richard Fendall II, and Lucy Eleanor Fendall, until her death in 1827. At their marriage, Fendall had created a trust for Mollie, with her brothers Charles Lee and Richard Bland Lee with Richard M. Scott as trustees, to ensure she would continue to possess the house and its small farm to the north. By 1825, however, she was apparently destitute and moved across the river to a rooming house in Washington.

In 1811 with the assistance of his sister Mary Fendall, Harry Lee was able to rent the stately house at 607 Oronoco, which was owned by William Henry Fitzhugh (another Lee). It is certain that Gen. Robert Edward Lee, the son of Harry, was a frequent visitor of his Aunt Fendall's household across the street. The family resided at 607 until Robert left for West Point in 1825. The multiple tragedies of Harry Lee's failed investments, injuries sustained at the hands of a Baltimore mob as he tried to defend a Federalist friend who had opposed the War of 1812, and his desperate search for health in Barbados, were too much, and Major General Henry Lee III died at Dungeness, Cumberland Island, Georgia on 25 March 1818 while trying to return to his family.

Although little is known of them, tax records show that the Fendalls owned 51 enslaved people in 1785, the year the house was built. Additional forced labor may have been hired from other slave owners. Two years after, in 1787, tax records show the Fendalls owning 17 enslaved people. In the 1820 Federal Census, Mollie Fendall is shown to have owned seven enslaved people. Some of the enslaved laborers may have lived in the back portion of the house.

Lee Family coat of arms

=== Edmund Jennings and Sally (Lee) Lee family ===
One year after Mollie Fendall's death in 1827, her youngest brother Edmund Jennings Lee I bought the house at auction. While continuing to live across the street at 428 N. Washington, he leased Lee-Fendall out for several years. Edmund was also a brother of Light Horse Harry Lee. His wife Sally Lee was the youngest daughter of Richard Henry Lee, a Senator and signer of the Declaration of Independence.

Edmund J. Lee was a lawyer, councilman, Mayor, Clerk of the Circuit Court, and vestryman of Christ Church. He was also a board member of the Alexandria Academy and active in other civic organizations. Despite his prominence, Edmund, like his brother Harry previously, encountered financial distress and was forced to first mortgage the house, then sell it at auction in 1833. In 1836, his son Edmund Jennings Lee II was able to buy the house. Edmund Sr. then moved from his home across the street at 428 Washington into the Lee–Fendall House. Sally died at Lee-Fendall in 1837. Edmund Sr. bought the house back from Edmund Jr. in 1839 and continued to live there until his death in 1843.

In 1841, former President John Quincy Adams visited Alexandria and stayed at the Lee–Fendall House. Edmund Sr. hosted a party at the house in his honor following a lecture at the Alexandria Lyceum.

In 1843, two of Edmund J. Lee's daughters, Hannah (Lee) Stewart and Sally Lee, inherited the House and leased it to Lucy Lyons Turner. Commonly known as "Aunt Turner", she was the granddaughter of Virginia Supreme Court Justice Peter Lyons and confidante of the Cassius Francis Lee, Sr. family. Cassius was a son of Edmund J. Lee I and a lifelong friend of cousin Robert E. Lee, son of Light-Horse Harry and later General of the Confederacy.

=== Louis A. and Harriotte (Stuart) Cazenove family and renovation ===
In 1850, Louis Anthony Cazenove, a successful Alexandria merchant, bought the Lee family home for his new bride, Harriotte Stuart, daughter of Cornelia Lee Turberville Stuart and great-granddaughter of Richard Henry Lee, signer of the Declaration of Independence. The young couple were joined at the house by Louis' daughters from his first marriage, Frances and Charlotte Louise, and his father Anthony Charles Cazenove, a French Huguenot immigrant from Geneva.

The Cazenoves renovated the home to include the latest styles and technologies. They added Greek Revival and Italianate embellishments to the original 1785 structure as well as the front and back porches, a third floor addition to the main section, and installed the first heating, plumbing, and servant bell systems in the house. They renovated the work yard into a Victorian pleasure garden, removing some outbuildings, adding a brick pathway around the perimeter, adding a greenhouse, planting trees (including the Magnolia, Black Walnut, and Ginkgo trees seen today), shrubs, and flowers.

When both Louis and A.C. Cazenove died in 1852, Harriotte was left to take care of Louis' two daughters, her infant son, and the house. In 1856, Harriotte moved her small family to her new country home three miles up the road at Seminary Hill (616 Fort Williams Parkway). Named "Stuartland" after her family, the new two-story house had eight rooms, plus a kitchen, and was in a similar telescoping style to the Lee–Fendall House she left.

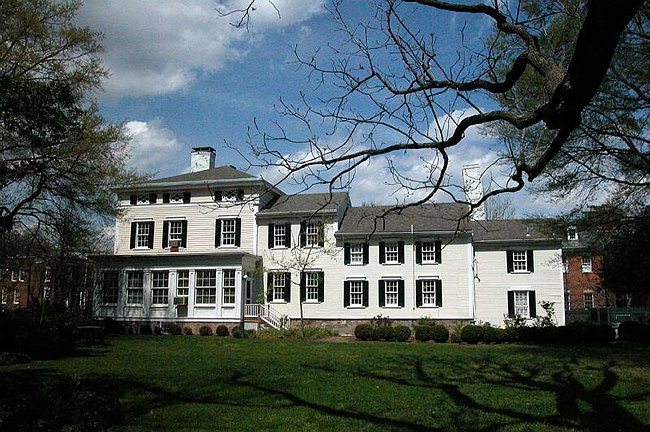
View of Lee–Fendall House from garden

When the American Civil War brought invading forces to Harriott Cazenove's door, she fled with her son to her mother's home in Chantilly, Virginia. Union forces occupied Seminary Hill and probably turned Stuartland into a headquarters. General George McClellan may have lived in the home prior to the Peninsula Campaign in early 1862.

Harriotte Cazenove leased the Lee–Fendall House from the time she left (1856) into the beginning of the Civil War. From 1861 to 1863, she rented the house to a New York railroad contractor and his family.

==== Malvina Harris ====
Malvina Harris was a child nurse and freedwoman who worked for the Casenoves. She is listed in the 1850 census as a "mulatto" (mixed-race) woman, 30 years old, who could not read or write.

=== American Civil War Union Army Hospital ===
In 1863, Edwin Bentley, Chief Surgeon of the Military Hospitals in occupied Alexandria, requested "the rebel house opposite Grosvenor hospital" for use as a medical building. He was "granted the authority to take possession of the withnamed house for a general hospital." The Union Army seized the house for unpaid taxes, but offered to return ownership and pay rent if Harriott Cazenove would swear the Loyalty Oath to the Federal Government. Harriotte refused to swear her loyalty and the house was turned into an annex of the Grosvenor Hospital. Chief Surgeon Bentley likely moved his quarters to the house and it was here that he performed the first successful blood transfusion. Hundreds of soldiers recuperated from wounds, surgeries, and illnesses at the house. Those who did not survive were placed in a dead house, or morgue, built at the back of the property.

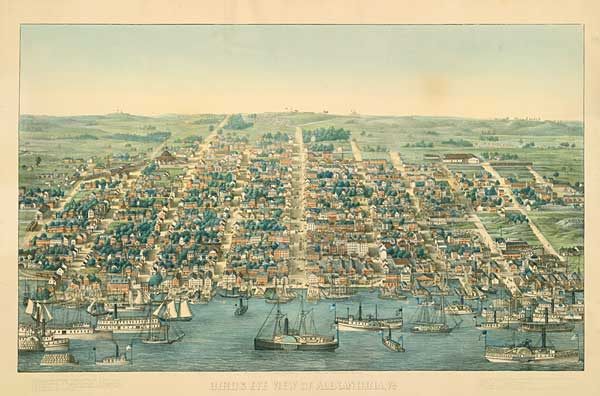
View of Alexandria, Virginia in 1863

=== Robert and Mary Elizabeth (Lee) Fleming family ===
Harriotte Cazenove never recovered the house after the war and in 1870, it was bought from the estate of Edmund Jennings Lee by Dr. Robert Fleming, who had married Mary Elizabeth Lee, eldest child of Colonel Richard Bland Lee II. Dr. Fleming died in 1871, and according to Mrs. James Lee Sheridan, Mrs. Fleming moved to Washington, D.C, and permitted her three sisters, Myra Gaines (Lee) Civalier I, Evelina Prosser (Lee) Morgan, Julia Eustis Lee, and one brother, Robert Fleming Lee to reside at the house.

In 1879, Mary Fleming described the house as having "large grounds with fine trees and shrubbery."

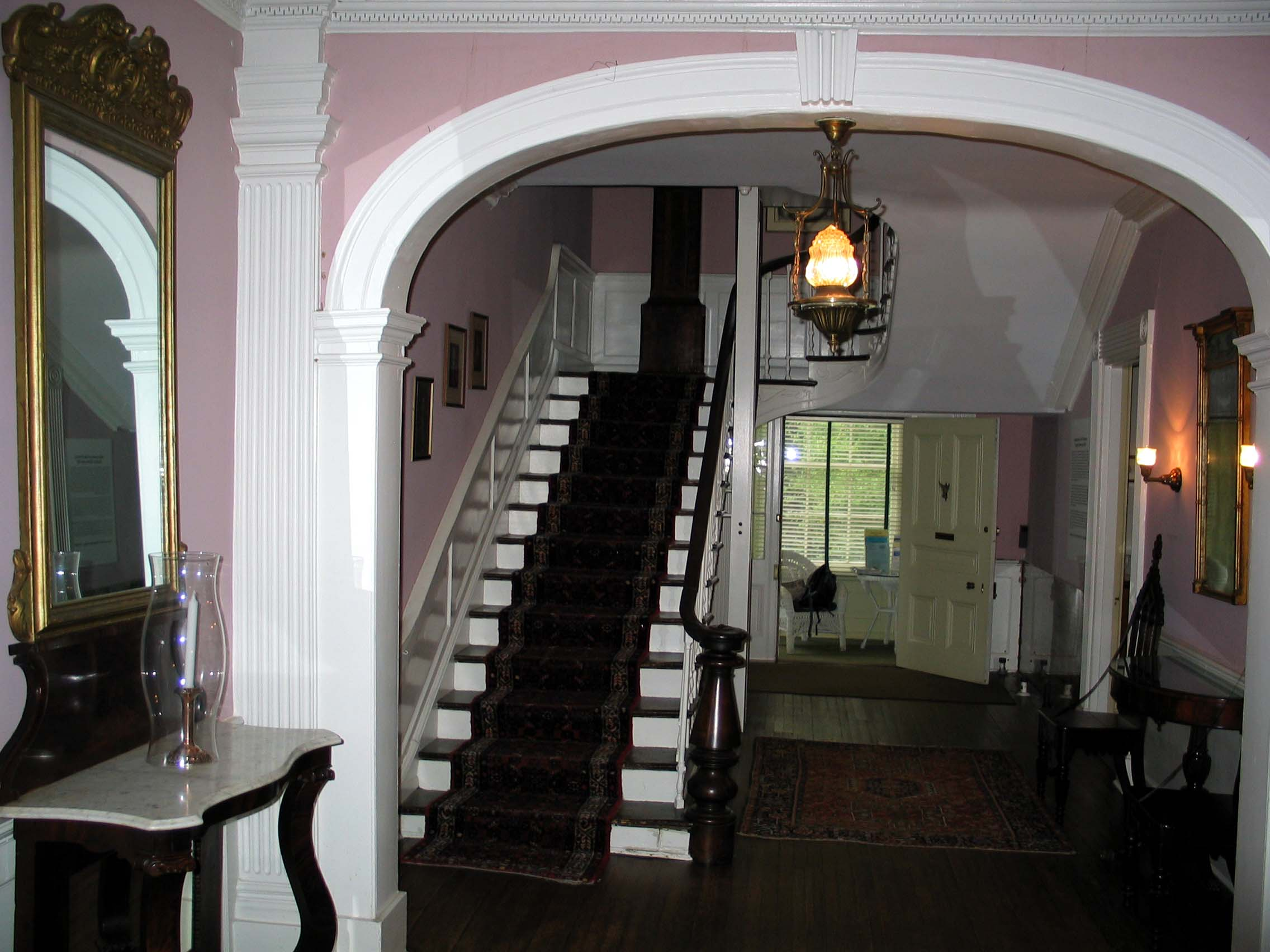
Front entry way of Lee–Fendall House

== After the Lees ==
=== Robert F. and Mai (Greenwell) Downham family ===
Upon the death of Mrs. Fleming in 1902, the house was to be sold to settle her estate. However, Myra Lee Civalier II loved the house so much that she threatened to burn it down with herself in it if it were sold out of the Lee family. As a result of her worrying, she was put into a hospital. In the meantime, Myra's mother, Myra Lee Civalier I, went to Myra's best friend, Mai R. Greenwell, and asked her to buy the house. At the time Greenwell, a singer and voice teacher, was content with the house she occupied and had no plans to purchase the Lee–Fendall House. However, a suitor was at the meeting, and upon hearing this, told Mai if she would marry him, he would buy the house for her. The suitor was Robert Forsythe Downham, who bought the house for $5,500 thus ending the Lee family's long ownership. Between 1785 and 1903, the house had been lived in by 37 members of the Lee family.

Robert Downham, an Alexandria haberdasher and liquor dealer, resided at Lee-Fendall with his family for the next 31 years. Robert Downham ran a saloon and along with his brother Henry continued his father's (Emanuel Ethelbert or E.E. Downham, twice Mayor of Alexandria) wholesale liquor business (whiskey, beer, and wine including the Belle Haven Rye brand). During Prohibition in Virginia he became a haberdasher. He was involved in the Friendship Fire Association, the Shriners, and the Knights Templar. He assisted in raising funds for the George Washington Masonic National Memorial. The museum archives contain many photos of the family enjoying the garden. In 1914, the Downhams hosted President Woodrow Wilson for a reception following that year's George Washington Birthday Parade.

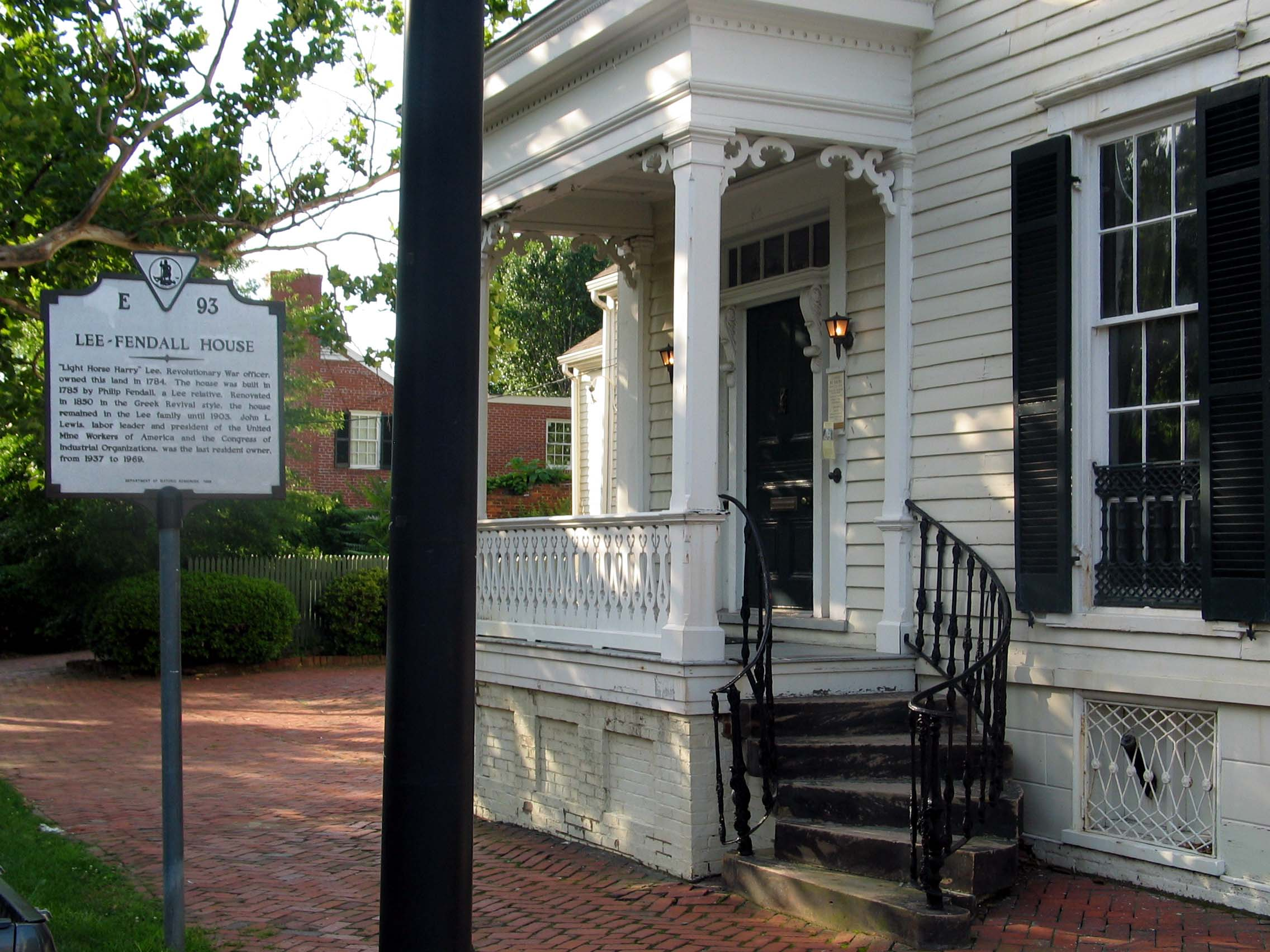
Lee-Fendall House

=== Myrta and John L. Lewis family ===
In 1937, the Downhams sold the house to Myrta Lewis, wife of John L. Lewis, president of the United Mine Workers. Deeding the house in Myrta's name was probably a way to protect it from any suits brought against her husband. During the next 32 years, the house was the home of the Lewis family including, much of the time, their daughter Katherine.

Myrta Edith (Bell) Lewis was a former schoolteacher and an antiques collector who married John on June 5, 1907. She was responsible for many changes to the house, for example, adding additional glazing to the south porch and painting the exterior white. She hosted two social events in the house before her death in 1942. Upon her death, their son John L. Lewis, Jr. inherited the property subject to his father's life estate. Their daughter Katherine, a secretary-treasurer of District 50 of the United Mine Workers at her mother's death, died in 1962 leaving their father the sole family member in the house.

John Llewellyn Lewis started life as a coal miner of Welsh descent in Iowa and quickly worked his way up the union ranks to be president of the United Mine Workers of America (UMWA) for over four decades. He moved the headquarters of the UMWA to Washington, DC to be closer to the people in power. As president of the UMWA, he increased wages by ten times, started the first safety regulations in the mines, and started health care facilities where there weren't any before. He was also one of the founders of the AFL–CIO. To do all this, he defied two presidents, Franklin Delano Roosevelt and Harry S. Truman. He supported Wendell Willkie for president in 1940 and pulled the miners out on strike in the middle of World War II causing a major energy shortage. During the strike, Lewis was strung up in effigy at the corner of Washington and Oronoco, outside Lee-Fendall, as a traitor for hurting the war effort so much. In 1945 to 1950, Lewis led strikes that Truman denounced as threats to national security. Lewis secured a welfare fund financed entirely by the coal companies but administered by the union with Lewis as its chair until his death. He retired as President of the UMWA in 1960.

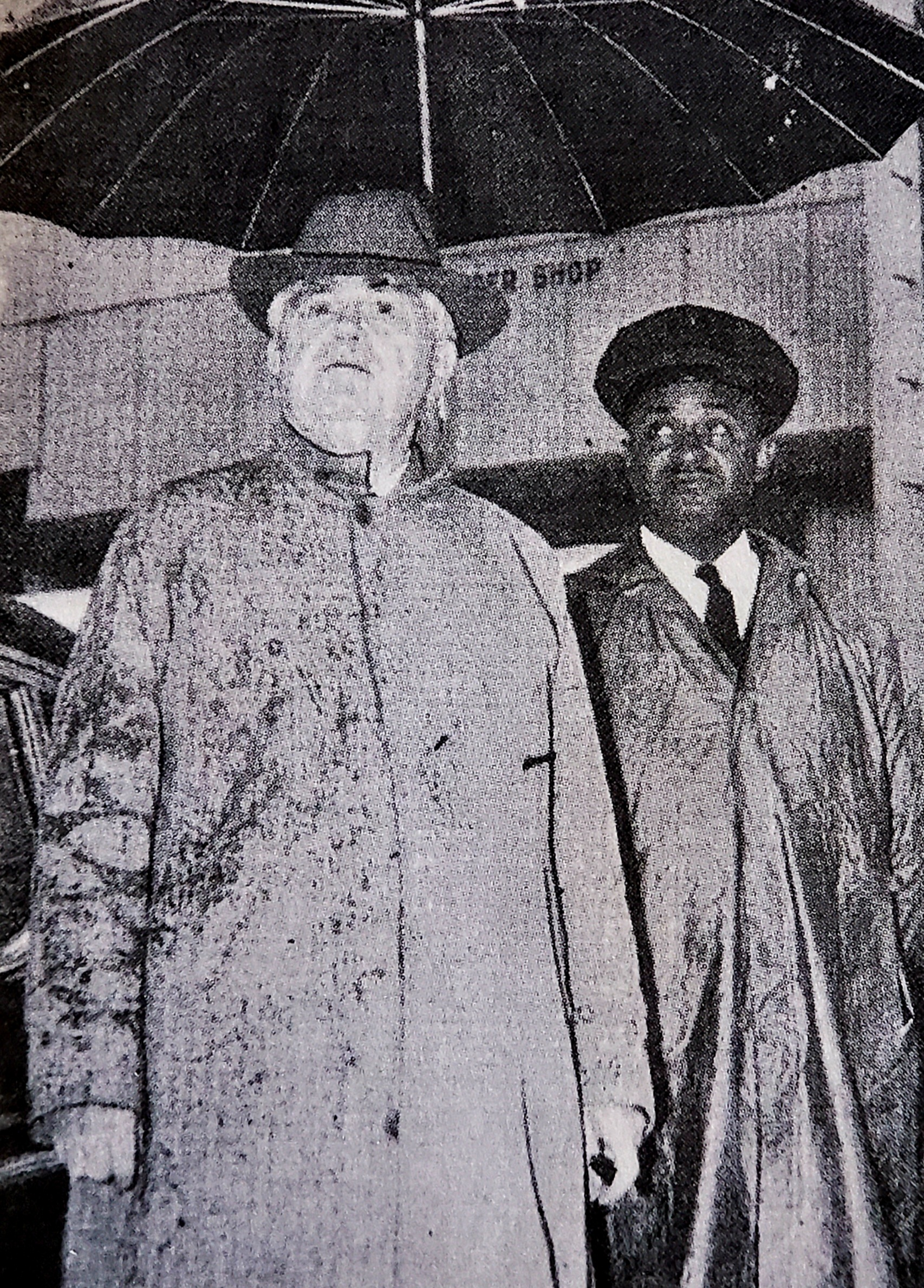
John L. Lewis and James Lewis Jr

In 1964, Lewis was awarded the Presidential Medal of Freedom by President Lyndon B. Johnson. In 1965, Lewis received the first Eugene V. Debs Award for his service to Industrial Unionism.

John retained the John L. Lewis House in Springfield, Illinois until 1965 while living at Lee–Fendall House. Lewis was frequently seen strolling the garden in the years before his death. John died in the house on June 11, 1969, at the age of 89. His estranged son, Dr. John L. Lewis, Jr., gained full control of the property.

==== James Lewis, Jr. ====
In 1941, James Lewis, Jr. (no relation) began working as a chauffeur, special assistant, and steward for the Lewis family. He drove John L. Lewis around the country and managed the household until 1969. He was a trusted friend and confidant of the family and served as special assistant to six more UMWA presidents following John L. Lewis.

=== Virginia Trust for Historic Preservation ===
After Lewis died, his son leased out the Lee–Fendall House until 1973. The son then sold it to the Virginia Trust for Historic Preservation, a 501(c)(3) non-profit foundation doing-business-as Lee–Fendall House Museum and Garden. The Trust was created in 1968 by Jay W. Johns with encouragement from Frances Shively in hopes of purchasing and preserving the house upon Lewis' death. The Trust received financial assistance from the Commonwealth of Virginia and the City of Alexandria in completing funding for the purchase.

The Lee–Fendall House Museum and Garden opened to the public the following year in 1974 just before the Nation's Bicentennial, a time when general interest in historic house museums and historic preservation were at a high. As with most small museums, funding for operations, maintenance, and renovation were scarce. Frances Shively was the first director of the Museum and lived in the House without drawing a salary. Memberships, donations, small grants, and revenue gathered from tours, events, and a gift shop were insufficient to meet the Museum's needs. In 2015, a Fendall descendant left a modest endowment to the Trust with its proceeds offsetting some of the Museum's costs. The original focus on the connections with the Lee family has been "expanded to encompass the experiences of enslaved people in Alexandria, the experience of Alexandrians during the Union occupation, the development of medicine, and social change in the aftermath of the Civil War and early 20th Century."

Between 1974 and 1976, the garden was restored by over 500 women who were part of the Alexandria Garden Clubs. First Lady Betty Ford personally helped raise funds for the restoration and it was designated Alexandria's official Bi-centennial Garden. From 2010 through 2011, archaeological investigations of the garden revealed more information about its use over time.

From its opening to the present, the House has become a well-known Virginia landmark. It was placed on the National Register of Historic Places and the Virginia Landmarks Register in 1979.

The Lee–Fendall House Museum and Garden today serves not only as an educational historic house museum but also as the setting for special events and private rentals.
