= Michael D. Quill Sr. =

American politician

55th Mayor of Auburn, New York
- In office January 1, 2008 – January 1, 2024
- Preceded by: Timothy Lattimore
- Succeeded by: Jimmy Giannettino

Personal details
- Born: Auburn, New York
- Party: Democratic
- Occupation: Retired fire chief, politician
- Website: https://www.auburnny.gov/mayor

Michael Dennis Quill Sr., is an American Democratic politician and retired Auburn fire chief who served as mayor of the city of Auburn, New York from 2008 to 2024.

== Background ==
Quill was born in Auburn, New York, to Ralph P Quill, a fireman and former Marine, and Anna Salata Quill. Quill attended West High School in Auburn. He joined the Marine Corps in 1968 and served in the Vietnam War. After his military service, Quill returned to Auburn and became a firefighter in 1973. He was promoted to lieutenant in 1980, captain in 1986, and Assistant Chief in 1994. In 1995, he became Chief of the Auburn Fire Department and led the 72-person team for 11 years. After thirty-two years of service, he retired from the Auburn Fire Department.

== Election ==
On November 6, 2007, Quill defeated Republican Timothy Lattimore in a close election and became the 55th mayor of Auburn, New York. Quill won re-election in 2011 and 2015 - defeating Lattimore each time.

In November 2019, Quill was elected to his 4th term as Auburn mayor, receiving 55% of the vote, defeating Timothy Lattimore who had 42% of the vote.

== Advocacy efforts ==
Quill has overseen tourist development and historic preservation efforts in Auburn, including the Harriet Tubman Home.

=== Fire Safety ===
As Fire Chief, Quill testified in front of the House Committee on Science in regards to H.R. 1118: Staffing For Adequate Fire and Emergency Response (SAFER) Act Of 2003. The SAFER Act enabled emergency departments in smaller cities nationwide to increase staffing as to be better prepared to deal with unforeseen emergencies. The SAFER Act is currently administered by FEMA and the City of Auburn has been awarded over $180,000 in grants as a result of Quill's efforts.

=== Founders Day ===
In 2009, Quill helped to create a Founders Day Celebration in the City of Auburn. The Celebration's aim was to promote the City's history and downtown business. The first Founders Day was held on June 6, 2009, and featured guest speaker Sarah Palin.

== See also ==
- List of mayors of Auburn, New York
