= Mark Dalrymple =

Scottish peer and soldier

Sir Mark Dalrymple Bt
- Baronet of New Hailes
- Born: 13 May 1915; Maybole, South Ayrshire, Scotland
- Died: 29 June 1971 (aged 56)
- Buried: Inveresk Cemetery
- Spouse: Lady Antonia Stewart (m. 1946)
- Parents: David Dalrymple, 2nd Baronet; Margaret Anna MacTaggart-Stewart

Sir Charles Mark Dalrymple, 3rd Baronet (13 May 1915 – 29 June 1971) was a Scottish peer and soldier.

== Life ==
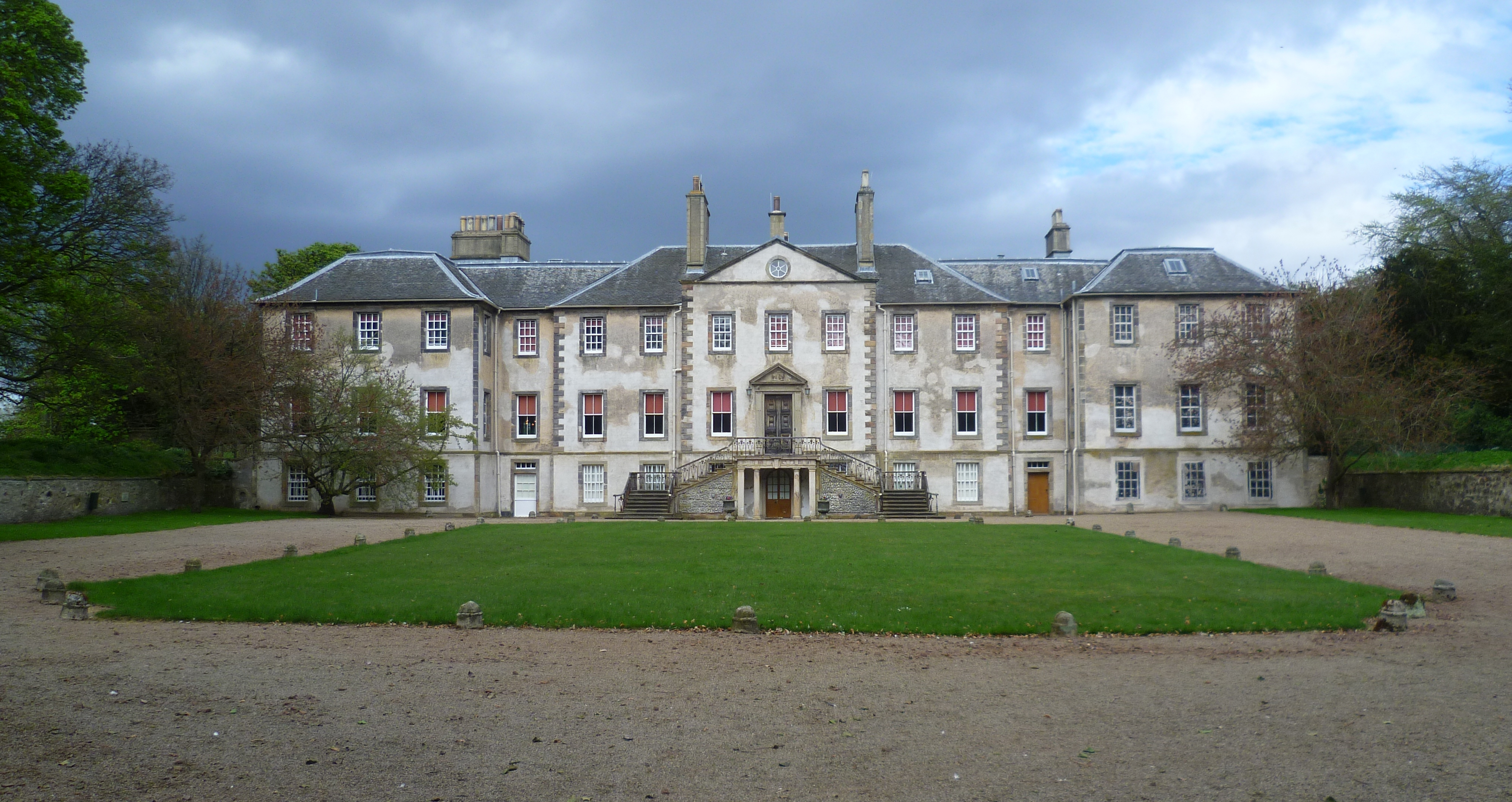
New Hailes House

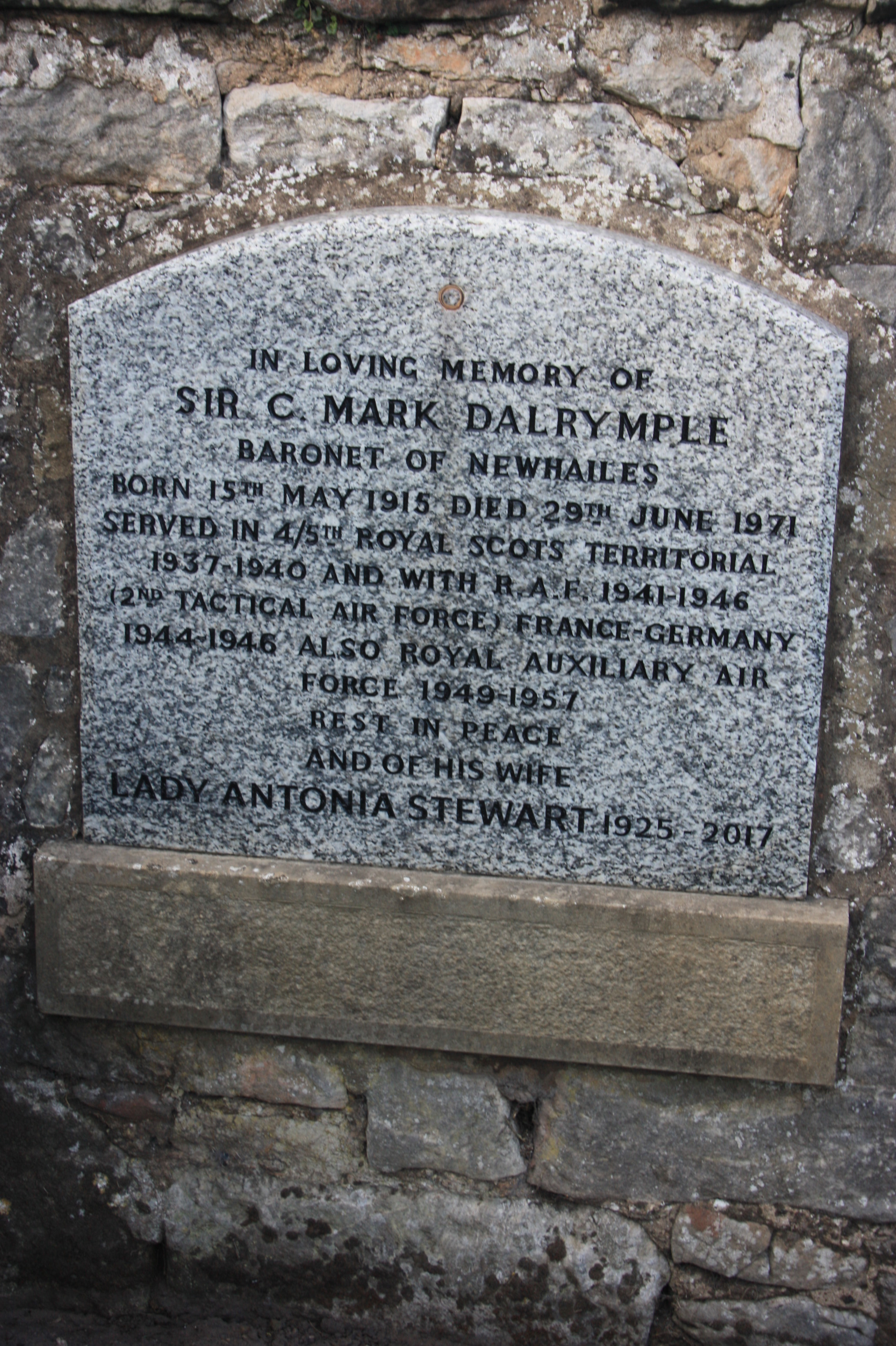
The grave of Charles Mark Dalrymple, baronet, Inveresk Cemetery

He was born on 13 May 1915 the son of David Charles Herbert Dalrymple, 2nd Baronet of New Hailes, and his wife, Margaret Anna MacTaggart-Stewart of the MacTaggart-Stewart baronets. He was raised at his ancestral home, Newhailes House, near Musselburgh.

He served with the 4/5th battalion Royal Scots Territorials 1937 to 1940, then in 1941, during the Second World War, joined the Royal Air Force. In 1946 he transferred to the 2nd Tactical Air Force serving in post-war France and Germany. From 1949 to 1957 he served with the Royal Auxiliary Air Force.

He died on 29 June 1971. He is buried in Inveresk Cemetery. The grave lies in the north-west corner of the first western extension to the churchyard next to the graves of his father and grandfather.

== Family ==
In 1946, he married Lady Antonia Marian Amy Isabel Stewart (1925-2017), daughter of Randolph Stewart, 12th Earl of Galloway and American heiress, Philippa Stewart, Countess of Galloway.

They had no children and the baronetcy became extinct with his death.

Baronetage of the United Kingdom
Preceded by David Charles Dalrymple	Baronet (of New Hailes); 1932–1971	Extinct
