= Henry Lee Higginson =

American businessman (1834–1919)

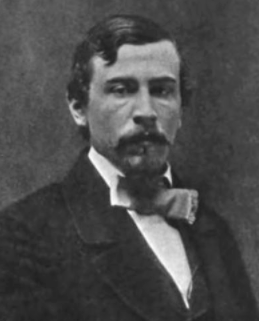
- Higginson in 1856
- Born: November 18, 1834; New York City, New York, U.S.
- Died: November 14, 1919 (aged 84); Boston, Massachusetts, U.S.
- Burial place: Mount Auburn Cemetery
- Known for: Founder of the Boston Symphony Orchestra
- Family: James J. Higginson (brother)

Henry Lee Higginson (November 18, 1834 – November 14, 1919) was an American businessman, financier and philanthropist best known as the founder of the Boston Symphony Orchestra and a patron of Harvard University. He also played a central role in the founding of General Electric.

== Early life ==
Higginson was born in New York City on November 18, 1834, the second child of George Higginson and Mary Cabot Lee. George was extremely patriotic, and never owned a house or a horse of his own until within a few years of his death. He was a brother of James J. Higginson and a distant cousin of Thomas Wentworth Higginson.

When Higginson was four, his family moved to Boston. His father jointly founded a brokerage as a junior partner. Henry's mother died of tuberculosis, from which she suffered for some time, when Henry was 15. Henry graduated from Boston Latin School in 1851, only after withdrawing twice due to eye fatigue problems. He began studies at Harvard College, but withdrew after 4 months when he again experienced eye fatigue and he was sent to Europe. Upon returning to Boston in March 1855, Henry's father secured a position for him in the office of Messrs. Samuel and Edward Austin, India merchants, a small shipping counting house on India Wharf where he worked as the sole company clerk and bookkeeper.

Henry Lee Higginson entered the Union Army in May 1861 as second lieutenant of Company D in Colonel George H. Gordon's 2nd Massachusetts Regiment and fought at the First Battle of Bull Run. He was commissioned major in the 1st Massachusetts Cavalry in March 1862. In the Battle of Aldie (1863) Higginson was knocked from his saddle and received three saber cuts and two pistol wounds. While recovering in Boston he married Ida Olympe Frederika Agassiz (born 9 August 1837 in Carlsruhe, Grand Duchy of Baden), daughter of Harvard professor Louis Agassiz, on December 5, 1863, in Cambridge, Massachusetts. They had two children, Cecile Pauline Higginson (1870–1875) and Alexander Henry Higginson (1876-1958).

Though he was discharged from the military as a brevet (honorary) colonel, he was commonly addressed as "Major" for the rest of his life to avoid confusion with his older cousin Thomas Wentworth Higginson, who was called Colonel Higginson. He was a Veteran Companion of the Massachusetts Commandery of the Military Order of the Loyal Legion of the United States.

== Career ==
After the war, he worked as an agent for the Buckeye Oil Company in Ohio from January to July 1865, purchasing equipment and contracting laborers to work in the oil fields. In October 1865, he and friends paid $30,000 for five thousand acres (20 km²) of cotton-farming land in Georgia. This failed adventure left him more than $10,000 in debt. Reluctantly at first, out of desperation, he started on January 1, 1868, as a clerk and later became a junior partner in his father's business, Lee, Higginson & Co., which at the time was a modest brokerage. His father had been a junior partner until 1858 and worked until his death in 1889 at age 85. This brokerage and banking company eventually became very profitable. Henry Lee Higginson was eventually a senior partner.

In 1913, he offered this assessment of changes in business over the course of his career: "There has been a steady improvement in the management of the Stock Exchange since I came down to the financial district. The methods in use to-day are very much better than they were many years ago. Men dealing with the Exchange are better protected." He allowed that there were still "rascals" and "a good many men who still need watching," but "not so many as there have been in years past."

== Philanthropy ==
=== Boston Symphony Orchestra ===
The scheme, half-baked, no doubt, was simply this: to give concerts of good music, very well performed, in such style as we had all heard for years in Europe; to make fair prices for the tickets and then open wide the doors.

— Henry Lee Higginson

Higginson described his plans for a symphony orchestra two years after he launched the Boston Symphony Orchestra in 1881:

In February '81 [1881] I began to put in shape a scheme conceived twenty-five years before that date [1856], namely to give orchestral concerts of the best attainable character and quality at a price which should admit any one and everyone likely to care for such things - my hope was to draw in by degrees a larger and less-educated class of society - I had meant to engage an orchestra and a conductor to be at my beck and call because this only could I ask and get practice sufficient in amount and quality to reach the playing of the great German orchestras.

On March 30, 1881, Higginson published in Boston newspapers his plan for a "Boston Symphony Orchestra" that would perform as a "full and permanent orchestra, offering the best music at low prices, such as may be found in all the large European cities." He advised his first music director, George Henschel, to hire only local musicians for the first year so as to avoid creating bad blood in local musical circles. For the first season's series of 20 concerts, prices were set at $10 or $5 for the whole series. Single ticket prices were set at 75 and 25 cents. For the weekly afternoon public rehearsal, seats were unreserved and all priced at 25 cents. The concert venue was the Boston Music Hall, and the orchestra would travel locally, offering concerts in such cities as Providence, Portland, and Worcester, as well as several in Cambridge at Harvard University's Sanders Theater. Soon, to address concerns about the availability of tickets, 505 tickets for the afternoon rehearsal concerts were sold for 25 cents to those who joined the queue outside the hall in advance of the performance. Tours to more distant cities followed, starting with Philadelphia and then New York. Casual summer concerts began in 1885.

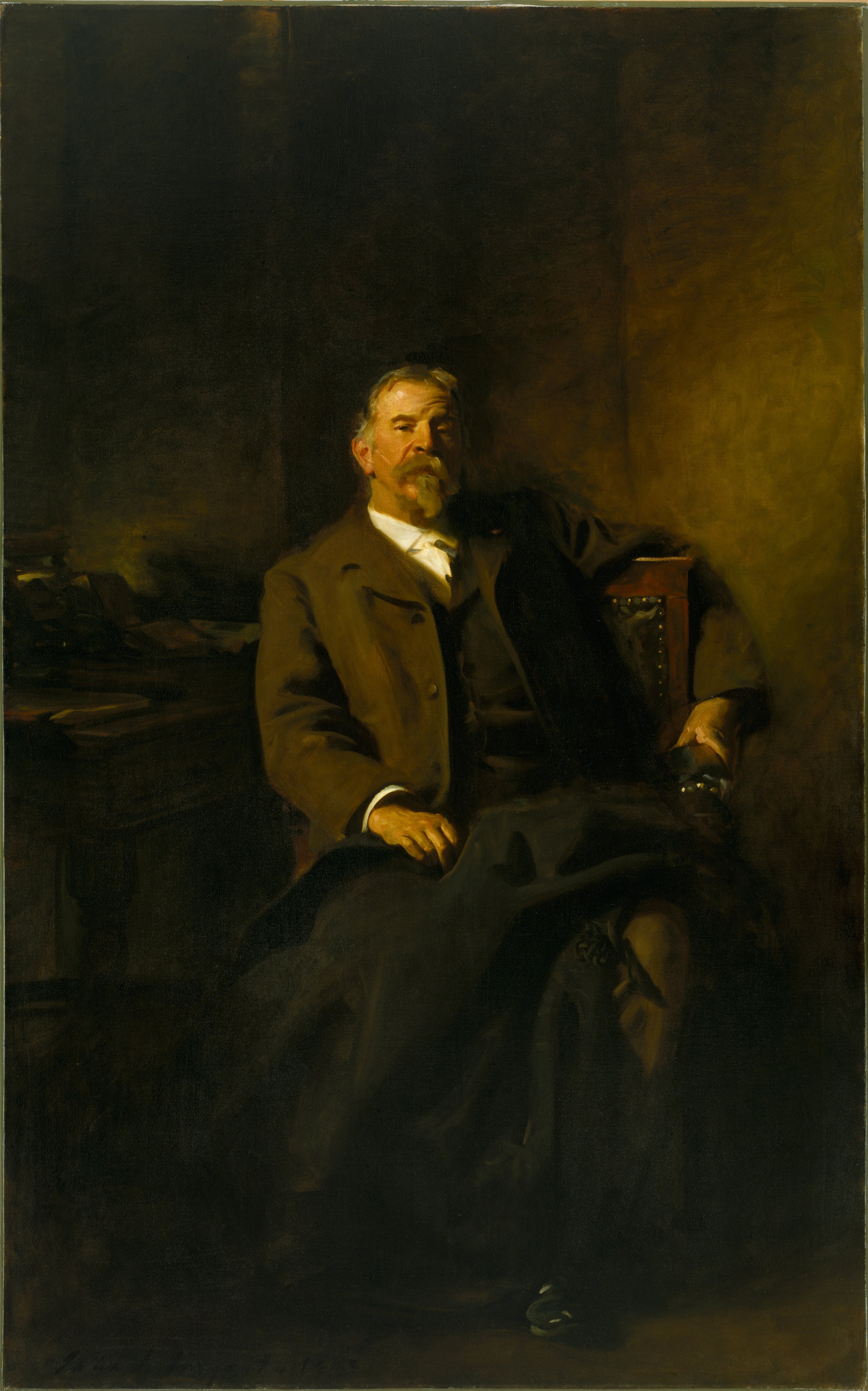
Portrait by John Singer Sargent (1903) in the Harvard Art Museums. A copy by Sargent's students is in Symphony Hall.

For many years, the organization accepted support from no one other than Higginson, who made up the annual deficit himself (in one year as much as $52,000). From the very beginning through at least the first 30 years of the BSO, through Julius Epstein, a Jewish friend in Vienna, Higginson had access to a continuous stream of the best conductors in the world, all European and German-speaking. In 1906, he sent instructions to those hiring on his behalf that the person they choose should understand that Higginson cared neither for modern music nor "the extreme modern style of conducting." He elaborated his tastes in another letter:

If you see Walter or Mengelberg, you will have to say to them . . . that I do know something about music, and that I have very distinct ideas as to how music should be played; that I shall not meddle with modern music, but that I shall certainly ask them to play the classics as they were played. I was brought up in the Vienna school (as you know) and there were plenty of men living then who had heard Beethoven conduct, as well as Mendelssohn, and knew how he wished his music given. I have known Brahms myself and heard his music. You know well enough what I wish, and I shall not interfere unduly with any of these men, but I don't want crazy work (such as sometimes even Nikisch gave us, and Paur gave us too often), and perhaps you had better tell them that I hate noise.

As sole administrator of the BSO during its early years, Higginson ensured the success of his new organization by tightly controlling the professional musicians. In 1882, he forged a new contract requiring his musicians to make themselves available from Wednesday to Saturday during the season and on those days to "neither play in any other orchestra nor under any other conductor...except if wanted in your leisure hours by the Handel and Haydn Society," a collegial gesture to a much older organization. After the fourth season, he authorized the BSO's conductor Wilhelm Gericke to recruit twenty musicians while summering in Europe to replace some who were "old and overworked."

For example, Higginson aggregated control by "threatening to break any strike with the importation of European players." Furthermore, over time he dropped musicians with ties to Boston and imported men from Europe of "high technical accomplishment, upon whose loyalty he could count."

During World War I, Higginson and the BSO's music director Karl Muck were the focus of public controversy when the orchestra failed to add the Star-Spangled Banner to its concerts as other orchestras did. Muck's ties to the German Kaiser made for exaggerated press coverage, but Higginson was the particular focus of criticism. The New York Times called him "obstinate" for his refusal to allow public sentiment to affect programming. The orchestra's publicity agent, writing years later, blamed Muck's eventual internment as an enemy alien on the "short-sighted stubbornness" of Higginson and the orchestra's manager Charles A. Ellis on the anthem issue.

In February 1918, with his finances so depleted by the war that he could no longer finance the orchestra's deficits alone, and anticipating the departure of Dr. Muck, which came with his arrest in March, Higginson determined to hand the management of the orchestra over to a new institutional structure. The announcement of a board of trustees to manage an incorporated Boston Symphony Orchestra came on April 27, 1918.

=== Other giving ===
In 1882, he was awarded an honorary Master of Arts degree from Harvard University and served as the first president of the new Harvard Club of Boston during a period when he helped raise a lot of money to send needy students to Harvard. He was awarded an honorary LL.D. from Yale University in 1901. He served as president of the Boston Music Hall and as a trustee of the New England Conservatory of Music from 1892 to 1919. He was also the president of the Tavern Club from more than 20 years, a "literary social club."

On June 5, 1890, Higginson presented Harvard College a gift of 31 acres (130,000 m^{2}) of land, which he called Soldiers Field, given in honor of his friends who died in the Civil War: James Savage Jr., Charles Russell Lowell, Edward Barry Dalton, Stephen George Perkins, James Jackson Lowell, and Robert Gould Shaw. This land later became home to Harvard Stadium and Joseph J. O'Donnell Field, where both football and baseball respectively are still played today. On June 10 of that year, at the dedication of Soldiers Field, he said:

One of these friends, Charles Lowell, dead, and yet alive to me as you are, wrote me just before his last battle:-- "Don't grow rich; if you once begin, you'll find it much more difficult to be a useful citizen. Don't seek office; but don't 'disremember' that the useful citizen holds his time, his trouble, his money, and his life always ready at the hint of his country. The useful citizen is a mighty unpretending hero; but we are not going to have a country very long unless such heroism is developed. There! what a stale sermon I'm preaching! But, being a soldier, it does seem to me that I should like nothing so well as being a useful citizen." This was his last charge to me, and in a month he was in his grave. I have tried to live up to it, and I ask you to take his words to heart and to be moved and guided by them.

His devotion to education was both enthusiastic and patrician. Once, when advising a cousin to make a large contribution to Harvard he wrote:

How else are we to save our country if not by education in all ways and on all sides? What can we do so useful to the human race in every aspect? It is wasting your time to read such platitudes.
Democracy has got fast hold of the world and will rule. Let us see that she does it more wisely and more humanly than the kings and nobles have done! Our chance is now–before the country is full and the struggle for bread becomes intense and bitter.
Educate, and save ourselves and our families and our money from mobs!

Other gifts to Harvard included $150,000 contributed in 1899 for the construction of the Harvard Union, a "house of fellowship" for all students of Harvard, where they could dine, study, meet, and listen to lectures. A few years later, he raised $10,000 to defray the costs of tuition and living expenses for students from China, a program somewhat at odds with America's exclusion of Chinese immigrants at the time.

== Later life ==
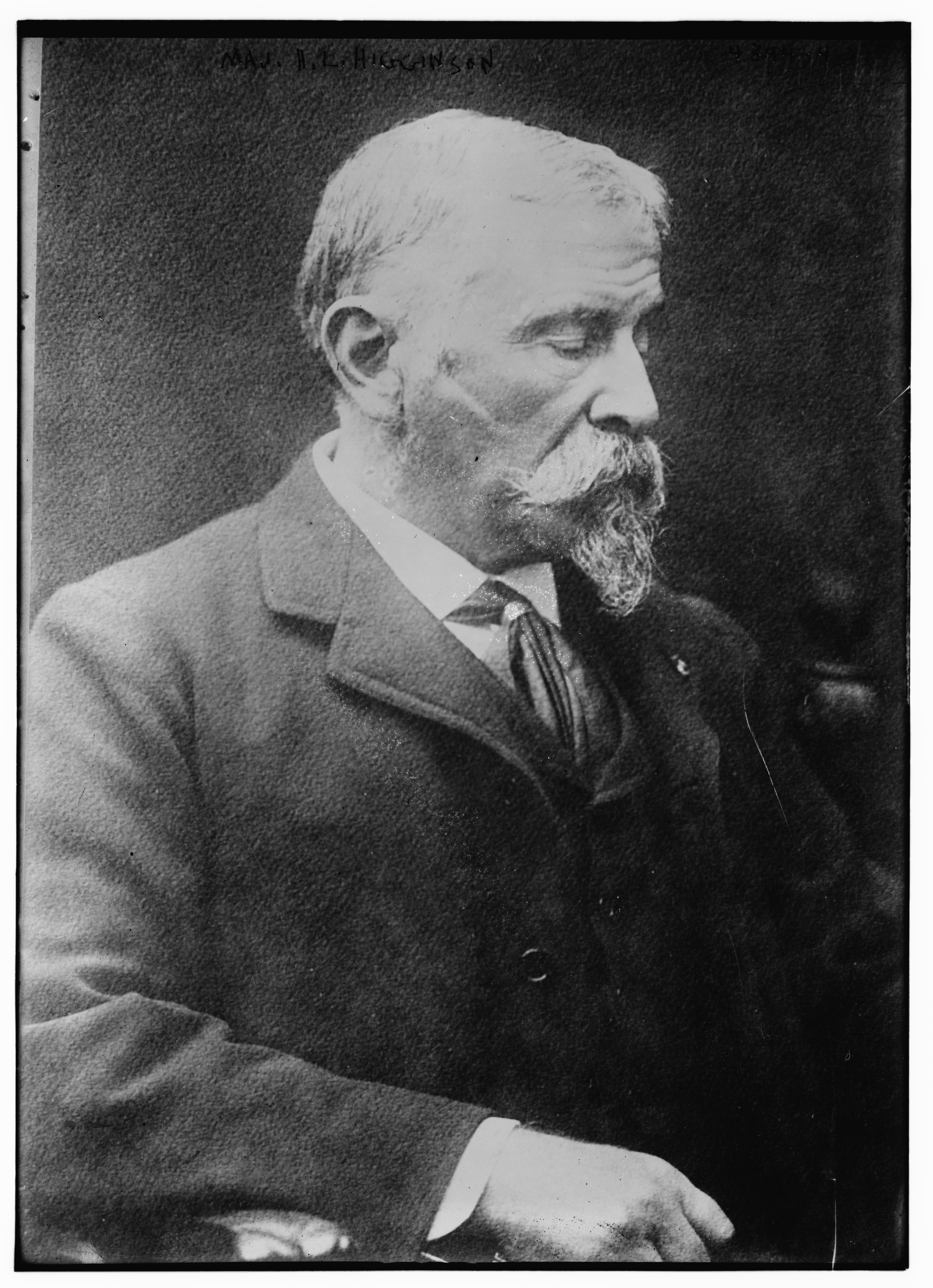
Higginson in 1917.

Higginson was very active in promoting quality education to citizens from all walks of life. In 1891, Higginson established the Morristown School for young men, now the Morristown-Beard School, declining to be named the school's founder. He was a member of the Board of Trustees of Middlesex School, and the school's Higginson House dormitory is named for him.

He was generally impatient with politicians. He objected to Theodore Roosevelt's attacks on big business. He wrote him: "Cease all harsh words about corporations and capitalists." He did not hesitate to provide President Wilson with unsolicited advice on his conduct of World War I.

Higginson in 1903 became an early advocate for the motor vehicle license plate. Annoyed by drivers speeding by his summer home in Ipswich, Massachusetts, with anonymous impunity, Higginson drafted a petition to the state legislature. The petition cited the need for a law whose provisions would expand upon those of a 1901 New York motor vehicle registration law by calling for state-issued license plates to be prominently displayed on all motor vehicles.

Sometime before 1913, he lent his name as an officer to the efforts of the Immigration Restriction League, which campaigned on behalf of literacy tests to limit immigration. Their avoidance of more straightforward racial categories and quotas only masked their fundamental bias against immigrants from Southern and Eastern Europe.

On January 25, 1915, Higginson was a participant in the first transcontinental telephone call along with Thomas Watson, Alexander Graham Bell, Theodore Vail and Woodrow Wilson. The telephone Higginson used is now located at the SPARK Museum of Electrical Invention.

In 1916, he accepted election to honorary membership in Phi Mu Alpha Sinfonia music fraternity.

== Death ==
He died on November 14, 1919, and was buried in Mount Auburn Cemetery in Cambridge, Massachusetts, following funeral services that were later described as "gala obsequies." One cousin's tribute described him: "He always seemed to me like the old knight of the castle–a part he played in some theatricals–giving sympathetic, spirited advice and inspiration of high example to the apprentice squires."

== See also ==
- Karl Muck, conductor, Boston Symphony Orchestra
- Boston Symphony Orchestra
