= Barrett Wendell =

American literary scholar and academic (1855–1921)

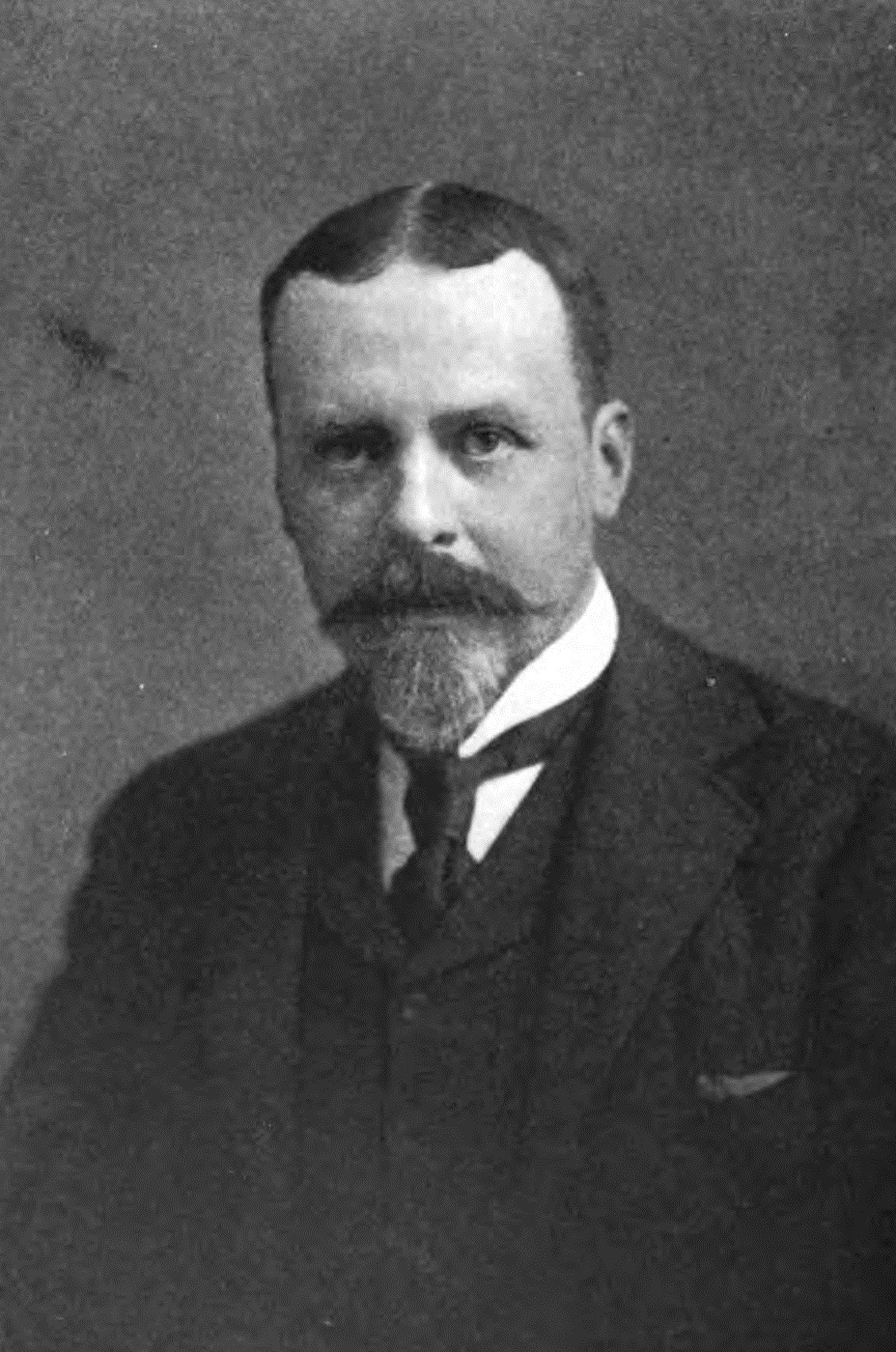
- Born: August 23, 1855; Boston, Massachusetts, U.S.
- Died: February 8, 1921 (aged 65); Boston, Massachusetts
- Relatives: Jacob Wendell (brother)

Academic background
- Education: Harvard University

Barrett Wendell (August 23, 1855 – February 8, 1921) was an American academic known for a series of textbooks including English Composition, studies of Cotton Mather and William Shakespeare, A Literary History of America, The France of Today, and The Traditions of European Literature.

== Early life ==
Wendell was born in Boston on August 23, 1855. He was the son of Jacob and Mary Bertodi (née Barrett) Wendell. His parents married in Boston in 1854, about a year after his father had moved from Portsmouth, New Hampshire, and joined the firm of J.C. Howe & Co. Among his three younger brothers were Gordon Wendell, philanthropist and athlete Evert Jansen Wendell, and actor Jacob Wendell.

His paternal grandparents were Jacob Wendell Sr. and Mehitable Rindge (née Rogers) Wendell. The first Wendell, Evert Jansen, left the Netherlands in 1640 and settled in Albany, New York. His maternal grandparents were Boston merchant Nathaniel Augustus Barrett and Sally (née Dorr) Barrett. Both the Barrett and Dorr families had deep roots in colonial America, with the Dorrs making their fortune in the fur trade.

Wendell graduated from Harvard in the class of 1877 with Abbott Lawrence Lowell, who was later a president of Harvard. At Harvard, Wendell was a member of The Lampoon.

== Career ==
In 1880, he was appointed Instructor in English at Harvard. He later became an assistant professor of English from 1888 to 1898, and a professor of English from 1898 to 1917, after which he was a professor emeritus. He was also elected to the Harvard Board of Overseers.

In 1904 to 1905, he travelled overseas, and lectured at Cambridge University in England, the Sorbonne in Paris, and other French universities. After this visit he wrote The France of Today.

He was a trustee of the Boston Athenaeum, a member of the Massachusetts Historical Society, and a Fellow of the American Academy of Arts and Sciences in 1916. He received honorary degrees from Harvard and Columbia University, and an LL.D. from the University of Strasbourg in France. He was an early member of the American Academy of Arts and Letters.

== Personal life ==
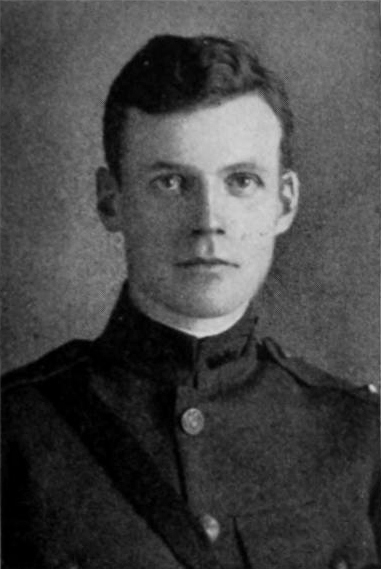
Photograph of his son, William Greenough Wendel, between c. 1914-1920

On June 1, 1880, Wendell was married to Edith Greenough (1859–1938) at Quincy, Massachusetts. Edith was a daughter of William Whitwell Greenough and Catharine Scollay (née Curtis) Greenough. Edith was a national leader of movements to preserve historical sites. Together, they were the parents of four children:

- Barrett Wendell Jr. (1881–1973), an investment banker who married Barbara Higginson, granddaughter of the founder of Lee, Higginson & Co.
- Mary Barrett Wendell (1883–1975), who married Geoffrey Manilus Wheelock. They divorced and she married Reinier van der Woude.
- William Greenough Wendell (1888–1967), who married Ruth Appleton, a daughter of Francis R. Appleton. They divorced in 1938 and he married Evelyn Fahnestock, a daughter of Ernest Fahnestock.
- Edith Wendell (1893–1963), who married publisher and Mayor of Auburn, New York Charles Devens Osborne in 1913.

Wendell died in Boston on February 8, 1921. His widow died in Boston in October 1938.

=== Descendants ===
Through his daughter Mary, he was a grandfather of Reiner Garrit Anton van der Woude Jr., who married his second cousin, Lady Anne Penelope Herbert, a daughter of Henry Herbert, 6th Earl of Carnarvon and the former Anne Catherine Tredick Wendell (Wendell's niece).

== Selected works ==
- The Duchess Emilia: A romance, Boston: James R. Osgood and Co., 1885.
- Cotton Mather, the Puritan priest, New York, Dodd, Mead and Co., 1891.
- English composition: Eight lectures given at the Lowell Institute, New York: Charles Scribner's Sons, 1891.
- Some neglected characteristics of the New England Puritans, 1892
- William Shakespeare, a study in Elizabethan literature, New York: C. Scribner's Sons, 1894.
- Rankell’s remains: An American novel, New York: C. Scribner's Sons, 1896.
- A literary history of America, New York: C. Scribner's Sons, 1901.
- Ralegh in Guiana, Rosamond, and a Christmas Masque, New York: C. Scribner's Sons, 1902 (Boston: Merrymount Press)
- The France of today, New York: C. Scribner, 1907.
- The privileged classes, New York: C. Scribner's Sons, 1908.
- The mystery of education, and other academic performances, New York: C. Scribner's Sons, 1909.
- The traditions of European literature, from Homer to Dante, New York: C. Scribner's Sons, 1920.

== See also ==
- Mark Antony De Wolfe Howe
- The Harvard Monthly
