= Randolph Stewart, 12th Earl of Galloway =

Scottish peer and British Army officer (1892–1978)

Randolph Algernon Ronald Stewart, 12th Earl of Galloway (21 November 1892 – 13 June 1978) was the son of Randolph Stewart, 11th Earl of Galloway, styled Viscount Garlies from 1901 to 1920.

== Early life ==
His father, the second son of the 9th Earl of Galloway, inherited the earldom upon the death of his uncle, Alan Stewart, 10th Earl of Galloway, in 1901.

He was educated at Harrow School, followed by the Royal Military College, Sandhurst, from where he graduated and was commissioned into the Scots Guards. He served with the regiment during World War I. He became a member of the pro-Nazi Right Club in 1939.

== Career ==
Upon the outbreak of World War II, he served as the first Commanding Officer of the 7th Battalion, King's Own Scottish Borderers.

== Personal life ==
On 14 October 1924, he married American heiress Philippa Fendall Wendell at St Margaret's, Westminster. Philippa was the second daughter of Jacob Wendell III and Marian (née Fendall) Wendell, who had been living in England for several years. Marian was in turn the granddaughter of Philip Richard Fendall II, a descendant of the Lee family and the District Attorney of the District of Columbia. Philippa was the sister of Anne Catherine Tredick Wendell, first wife of Henry Herbert, 6th Earl of Carnarvon. Randolph and Philippa had the following children:

- Lady Antonia Marian Amy Isabel Stewart (1925–2017), who married Mark Dalrymple, 3rd Baronet of New Hailes.
- Randolph Keith Reginald Stewart, 13th Earl of Galloway (1928–2020)

Lady Galloway died on 22 February 1974. Lord Galloway died on 13 June 1978 at which time he was succeeded in his titles by his son, Randolph. On his death, the earldom and other titles passed to Randolph's second cousin once removed, Andrew Clyde Stewart, a great-great-grandson of the 9th Earl.

Honorary titles
Preceded by Robert Francis Dudgeon	Lord Lieutenant of Kirkcudbright; 1932–1975	Succeeded by Gordon Guthrie Malcolm Bachelor
Masonic offices
Preceded by John Christie Stewart	Grand Master of the Grand Lodge of Scotland; 1945–1949	Succeeded by Charles Barclay-Harvey
Peerage of Scotland
Preceded by Randolph Stewart	Earl of Galloway; 1920–1978	Succeeded by Randolph Stewart
