= Randolph Stewart, 13th Earl of Galloway =

Scottish nobleman (1928–2020)

- Coat of arms
- Tenure: 1978–2020
- Predecessor: Randolph Stewart, 12th Earl of Galloway
- Successor: Andrew Clyde Stewart, 14th Earl of Galloway
- Full name: Randolph Keith Reginald Stewart
- Born: 14 October 1928
- Died: 27 March 2020 (aged 91)
- Spouse: Lily May Budge (m. 1975; died 1999)
- Father: Randolph Stewart, 12th Earl of Galloway
- Mother: Philippa Fendall Wendell

Randolph Keith Reginald Stewart, 13th Earl of Galloway, Lord of Garlies, Baronet of Corsewell and Burray (14 October 1928 – 27 March 2020) was a Scottish nobleman. He was also a descendant of Philip Lee, a member of the Lee family of Virginia.

== Life ==
Stewart was born in October 1928, the only son of the 12th Earl of Galloway and his American wife Philippa Wendell. He was diagnosed as schizophrenic (this diagnosis later rejected as having been hastily made and inaccurate) at a young age, and subjected to insulin coma therapy. It is possible that had he been born today his behaviour would have been recognised as autistic. He was educated at Belhaven Hill School in Dunbar, and at Harrow School in London. In 1952, at the age of twenty-three, his parents had him lobotomised in an attempt to control his behaviour. The lobotomy changed him forever; "I was never the same again" he told an interviewer. After this surgery, he spent the next 15 years in the mental wing of the Crichton Royal Infirmary, in Dumfries. In 1970 his parents placed him in the Monastery of the Transfiguration, in Roslin, Midlothian.

On 17 October 1975, he married Lily May Budge (b. 1916), from a working-class family from Duns, Berwickshire. Her father was a groom; her mother wove blankets. Budge had been married twice before, and already had four children, one of them adopted. His parents strongly disapproved of the marriage, and his father, the 12th Earl, went so far as to attempt to buy Budge out of the marriage. He died in 1978, leaving Randolph the title and little else, having written him out of his will.

With his wife's support, the couple moved to London and Randolph claimed his seat in the House of Lords. However, due to his mental condition and subsequent surgery, Lord Galloway proved to be an inept politician, and the couple soon moved back to Edinburgh, where the Earl's mental state continued to deteriorate. At this point he started to become violent, twice attacking members of the public and once his wife the Countess. Looking back on these acts he described them as "A disgraceful, disgusting, dishonourable and downgrading performance on my part". The Countess died in 1999 with the marriage childless.

Stewart died in March 2020 at the age of 91. His death was not announced until the following month. On his death, the Earldom and its associated Lordships and Baronetcies passed to Andrew Clyde Stewart, who is the great-great-grandson of the 9th Earl and thus Randolph's second cousin once removed.

Peerage of Scotland
Preceded by Randolph Stewart	Earl of Galloway; 1978–2020	Succeeded by Andrew Clyde Stewart
