= List of mayors of Auburn, New York =

The following is a list of mayors of the city of Auburn, New York, United States.

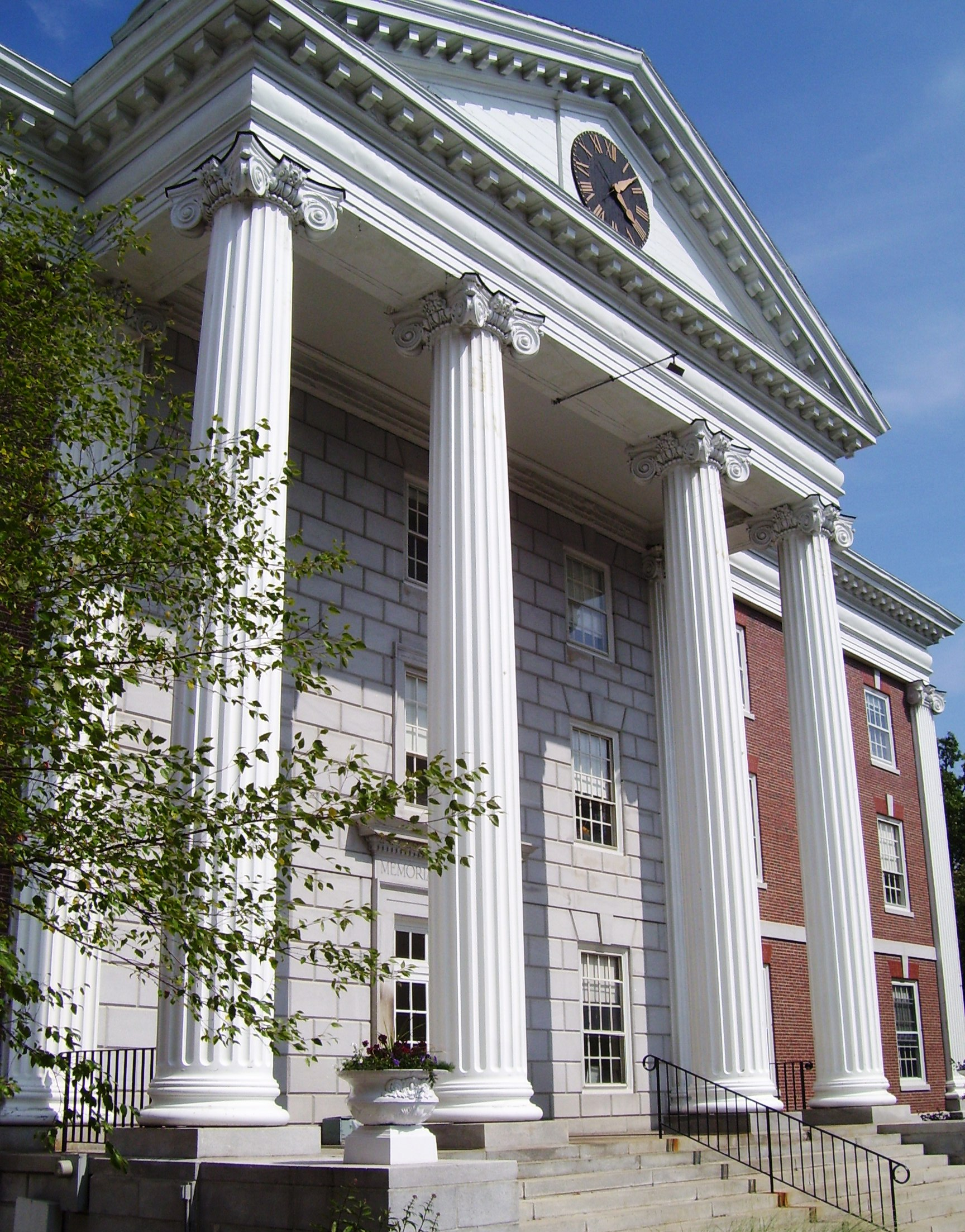
City hall building in Auburn, New York; built in 1930 (photo 2012)

- Cyrus Dennis, 1848
- Daniel Hewson, 1849
- Benjamin F. Hall, 1852
- Thomas Y. Howe Jr., 1853
- George Underwood, 1854
- Lansinch Briggs, 1857
- Christopher Morgan, 1860
- Jonas White Jr., 1863
- Charles G. Briggs, 1864
- John S. Fowler, 1866
- John M. Hurd, 1869
- Thomas Kirkpatrick, 1871
- John S. Brown, 1873
- Theodore M. Pomeroy, 1875
- Alexander McCrea, 1877
- Martin L. Walley, 1878
- David M. Osborne, 1879-1880
- Cyrenus Wheeler Jr., 1881-1886, 1889-1890
- Mortimer V. Austin, 1887-1888
- David Wadsworth Jr., 1891-1892
- Orlando Lewis, 1895-1900
- William C. Burgess, 1901-1902
- Thomas Osborne, 1903-1905
- E. Clarence Aiken, 1906-1907
- C. August Koenig, 1908-1909
- Thomas H. Oneill, 1910-1913
- Charles W. Brister, 1914-1915
- Mark J. Koon, 1916-1919
- A. Percival Burkhart, 1920-1923
- Roy A. Weld, 1924-1927
- Charles Devens Osborne, 1928-1931, 1936-1939
- Kirk Bowen, 1932-1935
- Carl R. Brister, 1940-1943
- Edward T. Boyle, 1944-1951
- Robert A. Nelson, 1952-1955
- Herbert T. Anderson, 1956-1959
- Maurice I. Schwartz, 1960-1967
- Leonard R. Greene, 1967
- Paul W. Lattimore Sr., 1968-1983
- Edward L. Lauckern Jr., 1984-1991
- Guy Thomas Cosentino, 1992-1995
- Christopher J. DeAngelis, 1996-1999
- Melina Carnicelli, 2000-2003
- Timothy C. Lattimore, 2004-2007
- Michael D. Quill, 2008-2023
- James N. Giannettino Jr., 2024-present

== See also ==
- History of Auburn, New York
