= Philip Richard Fendall I =

American lawyer

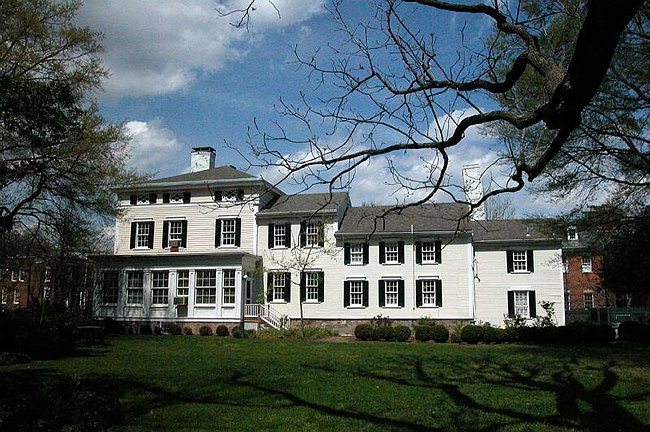
View of Lee-Fendall House from garden

Philip Richard Fendall I (1734–1805) was an influential banker, lawyer, and merchant in Alexandria, Virginia. He was a member of the Lee family and a friend and business partner to George Washington. Fendall constructed the Lee-Fendall House on the corner of Washington and Oronoco Streets as a lasting home for his family.

== Early life ==
Born on November 24, 1734, in Charles County, Maryland, Philip Richard Fendall had a profound influence on the socioeconomic and political structure of Alexandria, Virginia, society. As a banker, lawyer, and merchant, he was active in the financial and mercantile interplay of a thriving seaport community. Fendall was a member of the Maryland branch of the Lee family. His mother, Eleanor Lee, was the daughter of Philip Lee Sr. (1681–1744) of Blenheim. She was born in 1708 and married her cousin Benjamin Fendall on November 18, 1729. Her husband, Benjamin Fendall (b. 1705) was also a Maryland Lee, and his Fendall progenitors had held important offices in the Maryland colony.

Fendall Family Coat of Arms

Little is known about Philip Fendall's early childhood. He probably grew up at Batten Cliffs, his father's 550-acre estate overlooking the Potomac River in Charles County, Maryland. Fendall married his cousin, Sarah Lettice Lee on September 22, 1759, but she died soon after, on January 8, 1761. In 1764, Fendall succeeded his father as Clerk of the Court of Charles County. As clerk, Fendall worked at the county seat at Port Tobacco, Maryland, and was responsible for the oversight of the judicial records. He held the position until the American Revolution when, in 1778, he traveled to France to visit his cousin Arthur Lee.

== Family ==
Fendall returned home in 1780 and married another cousin, Elizabeth Steptoe Lee, the widow of Philip Ludwell Lee of Stratford Hall. Elizabeth brought significant land holdings to the marriage, including the 6,595 acres at Stratford Hall. Philip lived with Elizabeth, her two daughters, Flora and Matilda, and her son-in-law Col. "Light Horse Harry" Lee at Stratford Hall in 1784. In that year, Fendall bought a half-acre lot at the corner of Washington and Oronoco Streets in Alexandria, Virginia from Light Horse Harry for £300. He constructed the Lee-Fendall House, a large family home on the lot in 1785.

By 1787, Fendall's wife Elizabeth had contracted a cancer-like disease. She died unexpectedly in May 1789, while on a trip to Stratford Hall to visit her daughter. Two years later, in 1791, Fendall married a third Lee lady, Mary Lee, daughter of Henry and Lucy Grymes Lee of Leesylvania plantation, sister of Light Horse Harry Lee, and thirty years younger than Fendall. Mary and Philip Fendall had two children, Lucy Eleanor and Philip Richard Fendall II.

== Life and work in Alexandria ==
As the town of Alexandria flourished, Philip Fendall pursued a wide spectrum of commercial and financial ventures. With a group of leading Alexandria and Georgetown merchants, including George Washington, he became involved in the formation and development of the Potomac Canal Company, one of the greatest engineering feats of its day. As a director of the Bank of the United States in the 1790s, the citizenry of Alexandria drew upon his financial expertise to establish the first bank south of the Potomac in 1792. In 1793, Fendall was elected its first president.

As a man of diverse interests, he invested heavily in real estate. Many of these investments failed and Fendall was swept away by the maelstrom of economic inflation and depression. Like many prominent civic, business and social leaders in the South, Fendall became a victim of an erratic and uncontrolled national economy and declared bankruptcy in 1803. The final years of Fendall's life were not pleasant. From 1800 to 1805, Fendall found himself besieged with debts and he became emotionally and financially overwhelmed. Philip Fendall died in 1805.
