= Philip Richard Fendall II =

American lawyer & politician (1794–1868)

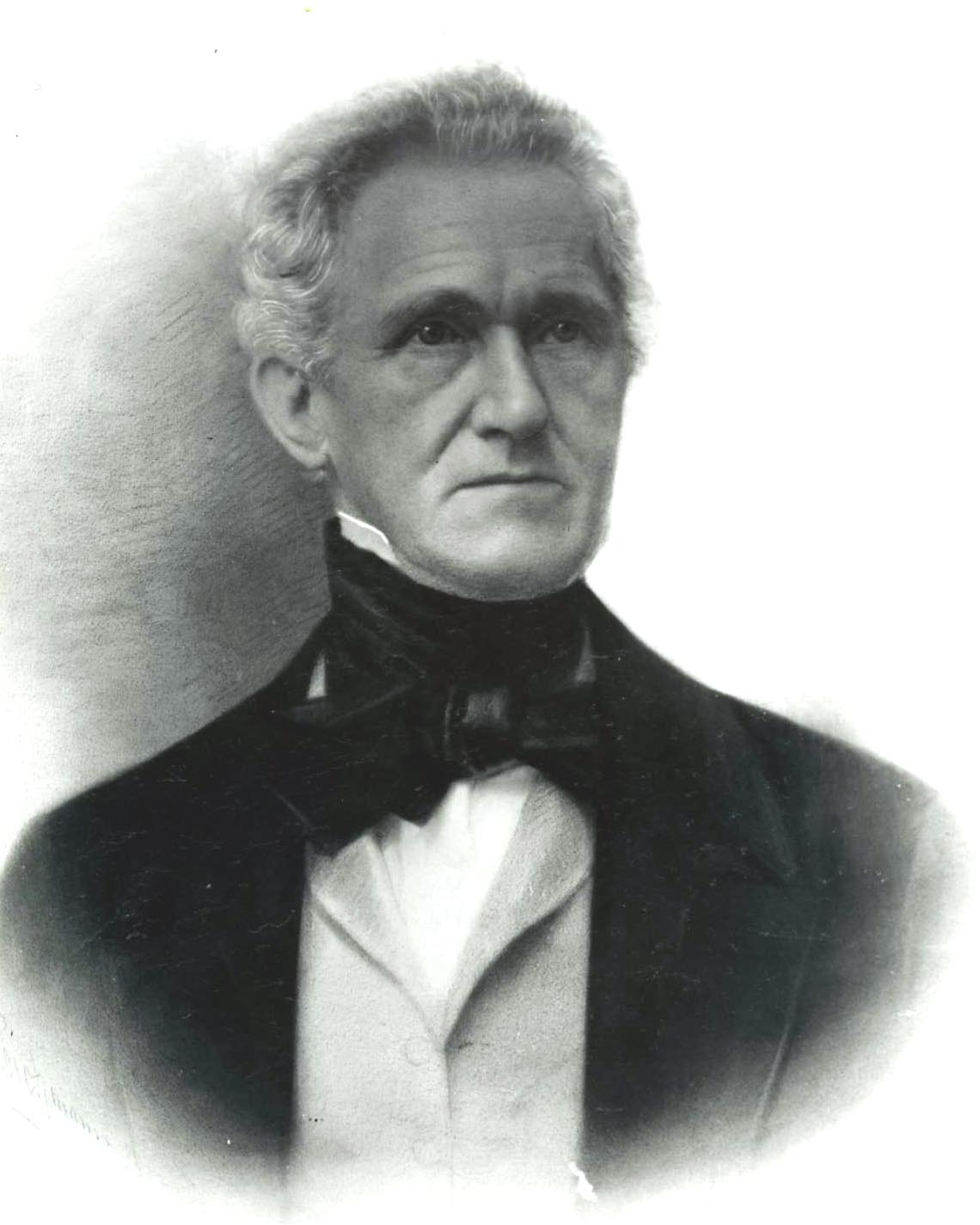

District Attorney for the District of Columbia
- In office 1849–1853
- Appointed by: Millard Fillmore
- Preceded by: Philip Barton Key I
- Succeeded by: Philip Barton Key I
- In office 1841–1845
- Appointed by: John Tyler
- Preceded by: Francis Scott Key
- Succeeded by: James Hoban Jr.

Personal details
- Born: December 18, 1794 Lee-Fendall House, Alexandria, Virginia
- Died: February 16, 1868 (aged 73) Washington, D.C.
- Spouse: Elizabeth Mary Young
- Parent(s): Philip Richard Fendall I Mary Lee
- Education: College of New Jersey

Philip Richard Fendall II (December 18, 1794 – February 16, 1868) was an American lawyer and politician who served as the District Attorney of Washington, D.C. He was also a descendant of Philip Lee, a member of the Lee family of Virginia.

== Early life ==
He was born December 18, 1794, at the Lee-Fendall House, located at 614 Oronoco St., Alexandria, Virginia, to Philip Richard Fendall I and Mary (née Lee) Fendall of "Leesylvania".

Fendall matriculated to the College of New Jersey, later known as Princeton University in 1812 where he excelled at forensics and belonged to several clubs and debating societies. His academic performance was excellent and he graduated with honors in 1815. He was the "First Honor Man" (Salutorian of his class).

== Career ==
Upon his return to Alexandria, Virginia following his graduation, he secured a position working in the law practice of his uncle, Richard Bland Lee, who was a Congressman from Northern Virginia. He was an aide to Richard, who was placed by President James Madison, as an overseer in charge of reconstructing the new Capital, due to the British burning the city during the War of 1812. In 1820 Fendall was admitted to the Alexandria Bar. The 1820s were filled with financial woes for Fendall, which were compounded by his mother's financial difficulties, and by 1821 the Fendall's were forced to mortgage the Lee-Fendall House on Oronoco Street, Alexandria, Virginia, which Fendall's father built. In 1822, Fendall was elected President of the Periclean Society of Alexandria. This organization was composed of 24 men who met and debated philosophical and political questions. It was through this, that Fendall sharpened his forensic skills.

In August 1824, Fendall was appointed by President James Monroe, as Captain of Infantry, 2nd Brigade of the local District of Columbia Militia. However, he did not hold this position very long, and it is doubtful that he exercised his command, for he resigned his commission on May 26, 1825. Fendall became the Editor of the National Journal in Washington, D.C., from 1824 to 1830, which was established by his close friend Peter Force, who at one time was Mayor of Washington, D.C. President Monroe appointed him judge of the Orphan's Court for Alexandria County.

=== State Department ===
In 1827-1828, Fendall was a clerk in the U.S. State Department. While working there he developed a lifelong friendship with Sen. Henry Clay, Secretary of State under President John Quincy Adams. On May 1, 1829, Fendall was terminated from his position by then-Secretary of State Martin Van Buren in an early example of patronage based terminations at the State Department. Fendall remained a loyal and close confidant to Clay through his long career.

=== District Attorney ===
On July 4, 1841, President John Tyler, appointed Fendall District Attorney for the District of Columbia. In 1844 he was dismissed when the Whig Party lost to the Democrats, and President James K. Polk came into office. In 1849 President Millard Fillmore re-appointed him to his former post and he served in this capacity until his resignation in 1853 during the Pierce administration. Fendall also maintained his own practice as a lawyer when not handling the affairs of U.S. District Attorney. In 1849, he was a pall bearer for the burial of Dolley (Payne) Todd Madison, wife of President James Madison.

=== Civil War ===
When the Civil War broke out, Fendall was put in an awkward position, as he opposed slavery. On June 29, 1861, Fendall may have written an introduction letter for Henry May (Maryland) to meet Edward Bates, Lincoln's Attorney General. The letter was found when May was arrested on September 13, 1861, by military authority.

Fendall's cousins, Gen. Robert Edward Lee and Col. Richard Bland Lee II resigned their commissions in the Army and took up with the Confederacy. Fendall had one son, Lt. James Robert Young Fendall, who fought for the Confederacy, and two others who sided with the North. His son Maj. Philip Richard Fendall III, was a Lieutenant in the Union Marine Corps., and another son, Clarence "Claude" Fendall was in the United States Coast Survey, responsible for drafting maps for the Union Army.

=== Writings ===
In 1829, while still a Clerk, Fendall began writing a book entitled A History Of The Adams Administration (President John Quincy Adams and Fendall were good friends). This was rumored a month before the inauguration of Andrew Jackson. It never was published, whether because of a lack of subscribers or time restraints on Fendall's career. However, a book was released entitled Parties In The United States that Fendall is rumored to be a collaborator of.

On June 16, 1830, upon the advent of Gen. Andrew Jackson, Fendall became the Editor of the National Intelligencer, one of the two daily papers in Washington, D.C., along with the Globe.

In 1860 under direction of the Joint Committee of Congress, he began to edit, revise and index the Madison Papers, which were the correspondences of President James Madison.

== Personal life ==
Coat of Arms of Philip Richard Fendall

Fendall married Mary Elizabeth Young (1804–1859) in Alexandria, Virginia on March 31, 1827. Elizabeth was the daughter of Brig. Gen. Robert Young (1768–1824) of the Second Militia of the District of Columbia in the War of 1812. Following their marriage, the newlyweds moved to Washington, D.C., and set up housekeeping at 4th and Louisiana Avenue. This spacious house would serve as Philip's home and law office for the balance of his life. It was also in this house where Philip and Mary raised eight sons and three daughters. Their children included:

- Mary Lee Fendall (1828–1911), who died unmarried.
- Philip Richard Fendall III (1832–1879), a Lieutenant in the Union Marine Corps; he married Anne Catherine Tredick.
- William Young Fendall (1834–1871), a lawyer in Washington, D.C.
- Clarence "Claude" Fendall (1836–1868), who was in the United States Coast Survey and was responsible for drafting maps for the Union Army.
- James Robert Young Fendall (1838–1869), a Lieutenant who fought for the Confederacy.
- Florence F. Fendall (1841–1926), who died unmarried.
- Arthur Fendall (1843–1878), who married Sally Cornelia Miller, a daughter of Thomas Miller, in 1874.
- Reginald Fendall (1845–1898), who married Annie Augusta Galt, daughter of Matthew Galt of Galt & Bro.
- Elizabeth Young Fendall (1847–1903), who died unmarried.
- Stratford Fendall (1849–1877), a lawyer who married Annie B. Robinson, daughter of William Champlin Robinson Jr.

Mary died in 1859, after thirty-two years of marriage. Fendall died February 16, 1868, at his home in Washington, D.C., at 1:00 p.m. He was placed in the vault at Glenwood Cemetery and then removed to the Presbyterian Cemetery in Alexandria, Virginia.

=== Memberships and advocacy ===
Fendall was the second president of The Jamestown Society, originated in 1854 to celebrate the 250th anniversary of the settlement of Jamestown. His name is on a bronze plaque at the base of the Washington Monument. The plaque honors those who formed the Washington Monument Society, to construct the Washington Monument in Washington, D.C. He was active in this work during the mid-19th century.

In April 1833, Fendall became the assistant secretary to the American Colonization Society in Washington, D.C., a society, which was formed in 1816 by a number of prominent Southern liberals including Francis Scott Key, George Washington Parke Custis, Andrew Jackson, Henry Clay, and ex-president James Monroe. The Society was interested in setting up a Colony, outside of America for free slaves to enjoy their freedom and own their own land. Fendall was instrumental in formulating the Society's goals. His draft stated that, "Slavery is not a good either moral, political or economical but it is an evil imposed on many of the Southern States, in far gone days without their consent. In the introduction of it, the Northern states bear their full share of responsibility."

=== Descendants ===
Through his son Philip, he was a grandfather of Marian Fendall (1870–1949), who married Jacob Wendell III in 1895, who in turn was the mother of Anne Catherine Tredick Wendell (1900–1977) (first wife of Henry Herbert, 6th Earl of Carnarvon) and Philippa Fendall Wendell (d. 1974) (wife of Randolph Stewart, 12th Earl of Galloway).
