= Milford Lake House =

Grade I listed building in Highclere Park in England

Milford Lake House is a Grade I listed building in Highclere Park, situated 1.5 miles north-north-east of Highclere Castle. Originally built as a Folly, since its construction the building has been used as a Summer house, and during the 20th century a series of renovations and additions allowed it to take on the role of a Dower house.

== Architecture and design ==
The building was originally constructed in c. 1743 as a Palladian pleasure pavilion, and its design is attributed to Henry Herbert, 9th Earl of Pembroke, although some sources suggest that the original architect may have been John Vardy. The house takes its name from the artificial lake it sits adjacent to, Milford Lake.

A major remodelling of the building by Charles Barry took place in 1838, during which its interiors were fitted with furniture and plasterings which had originally been installed at Highclere Castle. Barry also oversaw a major renovation and redesign of Highclere Castle during the 1830s, and during this period Milford Lake House may have been used as a temporary residence by the 3rd Earl of Carnarvon.

The principal façade forms an 11-bay composition set along the wide earth dam of Milford Lake. Two single-storey wings flank either side of the central part of the building. The side bays are recessed, while the central block and end pavilions project forward, producing a rhythmic sequence of three recessed sections and round-arched openings. The exterior comprises pale brick with blue-header diapering and extensive stone dressings, including rustication, modillion cornices, flat-arched openings with keystones, and a parapet with panel and blocking course. Ball finials and a central vase ornament the roofline. The building retains classical sash windows, panelled doors, and a low-pitched slate roof with a four-flue stack. Rear extensions copy the original style.

Internally, the central room and flanking corridors retain their 1830s classical design, including panelled ceilings, ornate doorcases, and a mantelpiece. The central section of the building contains a dining room running the width of the building, which retains much of its original white-and-gold panelling. The monumental chimneypiece and doorcase were inserted from Highclere Castle; their scale and awkward junctions suggest they were originally designed for a larger room. A 1986 Country Life article exploring the building suggests that because the doorcase was so admired, a previous Earl had arranged for a doorway to be cut through what had originally been a blind bay to accommodate it, even though this created a reportedly draughty and impractical entrance.

In 1964, the house underwent further additions and two staff cottages were added under the designs of the architect Sir Martyn Beckett, 2nd Bt. In March 1996 the Earl of Carnarvon submitted a planning application to Basingstoke Council for a single-storey rear extension to the house.

== History ==
During the 19th century, the house was sometimes referred to simply as "Milford". In September 1873 The Morning Post reported that The Hon. Auberon Herbert MP (a younger son of Henry Herbert, 3rd Earl of Carnarvon) and Lady Florence Herbert were staying at Milford.

In the late 1940s, the fishing rights to Milford Lake were rented by Jack Malden, the former games master at Cheam, for £40 a year. Chapman Pincher records in his memoirs that Milford Lake was well-known locally to be teeming with fish, and he frequently fished at the Lake as a boy during the 40s. The opportunity to rent the fishing rights at the lake was no longer permitted when Lord Porchester took up residence at the house in c. 1949.

The Evening Standard reported in February 1956 that Lord Porchester was due to arrive at Southampton on 22 February with his new bride, Jean, Lady Porchester, with whom he would be taking up residence at Milford Lake House. The couple had been honeymooning in Miami following their wedding in New York during January of the same year. The new Lady Porchester was a granddaughter of Oliver Wallop, 8th Earl of Portsmouth, who had emigrated to the United States during the 1880s and succeeded his older brother as Earl of Portsmouth in 1925. Jean was also a sister of politician Malcolm Wallop, who served as a United States Senator for Wyoming from 1977 to 1995. Declassified U.S. State Department documents show that Senator Wallop visited Milford Lake House from 20 to 28 December 1977.

In January 1957 the Liverpool Echo reported that Lord and Lady Porchester had temporarily relocated to Highclere Castle whilst renovations were underway at Milford Lake House, which reportedly included the addition of a nursery for their new son George, who had been born in the previous November. The Porchesters continued to occupy the house during the 1960s and 1970s, which allowed the Porchester's children to maintain a close relationship with their grandfather the Sixth Earl of Carnarvon, who lived nearby at Highclere Castle.

Queen Elizabeth II was a frequent guest at Milford Lake House during the second half of the 20th century; she and Lord Porchester were childhood friends, and "Porchie" was employed as her racing manager from 1969 until his death in 2001. Contemporary newspaper articles report that the Queen stayed with the Porchesters at Milford Lake House during the weekend of 27–28 May 1961, 1–2 December 1962, 28–29 October 1967, and 27–28 February 1982.

Porchie's father Henry Herbert, 6th Earl of Carnarvon died in 1987, and he succeeded as Seventh Earl of Carnarvon and owner of the Highclere Estate. Although the ancestral seat of the Earls of Carnarvon was Highclere Castle, the new Earl and Countess continued to reside at Milford Lake House. The Daily Telegraph recorded their address at Milford Lake House in 1992, and they continued to reside there during the 1990s.

Following the death of The 7th Earl of Carnarvon in 2001, his widow Jean, Dowager Countess of Carnarvon, continued to live at Milford Lake House during her widowhood. Follow Jean's death in 2019, Milford Lake House became the residence of her daughter Lady Carolyn Warren, the younger sister of George Herbert, 8th Earl of Carnarvon.
