= Countess of Carnarvon =

Countess of Carnarvon is a title given to the wife of the Earl of Carnarvon. Women who have held the title include:

- Elizabeth Herbert, Countess of Carnarvon (1752–1826)
- Kitty Herbert, Countess of Carnarvon (1772–1813)
- Almina Herbert, Countess of Carnarvon (1876–1969)
- Tilly Losch (1903–1975)
- Jean Herbert, Countess of Carnarvon (1935–2019)
