= Henry Herbert, 7th Earl of Carnarvon =

British peer and racing manager to Queen Elizabeth II (1924–2001)

The Right Honourable The Earl of Carnarvon KCVO KBE DL
- Carnarvon in 1963

Member of the House of Lords
- Lord Temporal
- Hereditary peerage 7 December 1987 – 11 November 1999
- Preceded by: The 6th Earl of Carnarvon
- Succeeded by: Seat abolished
- Elected Hereditary Peer; 11 November 1999 – 11 September 2001
- Election: 1999
- Preceded by: Seat established
- Succeeded by: The 2nd Baron Chorley

Personal details
- Born: Henry George Reginald Molyneux Herbert; 19 January 1924 London, England
- Died: 11 September 2001 (aged 77) Highclere, Hampshire, England
- Spouse: Jean Margaret Wallop (m. 1956)
- Children: George Herbert, 8th Earl of Carnarvon; Hon. Henry Herbert; Lady Carolyn Warren
- Parent(s): Henry Herbert, 6th Earl of Carnarvon; Anne Catherine Tredick Wendell

Henry George Reginald Molyneux Herbert, 7th Earl of Carnarvon, KCVO, KBE, DL (19 January 1924 – 11 September 2001), was a British peer and racing manager to Queen Elizabeth II from 1969 until his death. From his birth until September 1987, he was known by the courtesy title Lord Porchester.

A member of Hampshire County Council for 24 years, he was its chairman from 1973 to 1977 and also served on other public bodies, including the Sports Council and the Agricultural Research Council.

He owned the Highclere Castle estate and, through his mother, was a descendant of the Lee family of Virginia.

== Life and career ==
Carnarvon was born Henry George Reginald Molyneux Herbert on 19 January 1924 at Lancaster Gate, west London, the only son of Catherine Herbert, Countess of Carnarvon, from New York, and Henry Herbert, 6th Earl of Carnarvon, who had recently inherited the family peerages. He was educated at Eton College, and during the Second World War was commissioned into the Royal Horse Guards, serving in Egypt and Italy. He left the army as a lieutenant in 1947, after which he studied at the Royal Agricultural College, Cirencester, with a view to farming and managing the stud on his father's Highclere estate.

Carnarvon was a personal friend of Princess Elizabeth, later Queen Elizabeth II, from their teenage years. She often visited Highclere Castle and, like his other friends, called him "Porchey", after his courtesy title. In 1969, Carnarvon was appointed the Queen's racing manager, a position he held until his death. His son, the 8th Earl, who is the Queen's godson, observed that

[I]t was a very equal friendship ranging over many interests. They were from the same generation. They had been through the war. They shared a great love of the countryside and wildlife as well as horses. He and the Queen had a similar passion for every aspect and detail of horse breeding.

As Lord Porchester, Carnarvon became an influential figure in British horseracing, establishing a reputation as a successful breeder at the Highclere Stud. He played a leading role in the administration and restructuring of the racing industry. In 1964, he was elected to the Jockey Club and was chairman of the club's race planning committee from 1967 to 1985. As well as being the Queen's racing manager, he was an active member of several other racing committees. He was appointed President of Newbury Racecourse in 1985.

Carnarvon was an independent member of the Hampshire County Council for 24 years and served as its chairman from 1973 to 1977. He also served on a number of public bodies, including the Sports Council from 1965 to 1970, the Agricultural Research Council from 1978 to 1982, and was Chairman of the South East Economic Planning Council from 1971 to 1979. He served as President of Hampshire County Cricket Club from 1966 to 1968 and became Honorary Colonel of the 115th (Hampshire Fortress) Engineer Regiment (Territorial Army) in 1963.

He succeeded as Earl of Carnarvon in 1987 and sat in the House of Lords as a crossbencher, using his position to promote the interests of horseracing. He also inherited the family seat, Highclere Castle, although he continued to reside at Milford Lake House following his father's death.

He was invested as a Knight Commander of the Order of the British Empire (KBE) in the 1976 Birthday Honours and Knight Commander of the Royal Victorian Order (KCVO) in the 1982 Birthday Honours.

Carnarvon died from a heart attack at Highclere on 11 September 2001, aged 77. He was succeeded as the Queen's racing manager by his son-in-law John Warren, a former stable boy who had worked at the Highclere Stud and married his daughter Carolyn. The Queen attended the Carnarvon's funeral and remained a friend of his widow, Jeanie.

=== Marriage and children ===
On 7 January 1956, Carnarvon (then known by his courtesy title Lord Porchester) married Jean Margaret Wallop (1935–2019) of Big Horn, Wyoming, in St. James' Episcopal Church in New York City. She was a granddaughter of Oliver Wallop, 8th Earl of Portsmouth. Carnarvon's father, the 6th Earl, had also married an Anglo-American. Following their honeymoon in Miami, they returned to the United Kingdom and took up residence at Milford Lake House on the Highclere Estate.

Carnarvon and Wallop had three children:

- George Herbert, 8th Earl of Carnarvon (born 10 November 1956). He married Jayne Wilby on 16 December 1989, had two children, and divorced in January 1998. He then married Fiona Aitken on 18 February 1999, with whom he had one son:
  - Lady Saoirse Herbert (born 2 June 1991)
  - George Kenneth Oliver Molyneux Herbert, Lord Porchester (born 13 October 1992), the heir to the titles
  - Hon. Edward Herbert (born 10 October 1999)
- The Hon. Henry "Harry" Malcolm Herbert (2 March 1959). He married Francesca "Chika" Vaughan Bevan (Francesca Herbert, now wife of Edward Fitzalan-Howard, 18th Duke of Norfolk in 1992 and had three children. He married Clodagh McKenna, a TV chef and broadcaster and daughter of the late James J. McKenna and his wife Irene, on 14 August 2021 at the Church of Saint Michael and All Angels, Highclere:
  - Chloe Victoria Herbert (born 1994)
  - Francesca Jeanie Herbert (born 21 November 1995)
  - William Henry Herbert (born 14 November 1999)
- Lady Carolyn Herbert, (born 27 January 1962), who married John Warren, racing manager to Queen Elizabeth II, in 1985. They have three children:
  - Jake James Warren (born 1986) a godson of Diana, Princess of Wales.
  - Susanna Warren (born 1988)
  - Alexander Edward Warren (born 1994)

== Cultural depictions ==
Carnarvon is featured as a character in the first three series of the Netflix drama The Crown, portrayed by Joseph Kloska in the first two series and John Hollingworth in the third. He was portrayed again in the sixth-series episode "The Ritz" by Joe Edgar and Tim Bentinck.

Peerage of Great Britain
Preceded by Henry Herbert	Earl of Carnarvon; 1987–2001; Member of the House of Lords (1987–1999)	Succeeded by George Herbert
Parliament of the United Kingdom
New office created by the House of Lords Act 1999	Elected hereditary peer to the House of Lords under the House of Lords Act 1999; 1999–2001	Succeeded by The Lord Chorley
