= Henry Herbert, 6th Earl of Carnarvon =

British peer (1898–1987)

The Right Honourable The Earl of Carnarvon
- 6th Earl of Carnarvon
- Tenure: 1923–1987
- Born: Henry George Alfred Marius Victor Francis Herbert; 7 November 1898; London, England
- Died: 22 September 1987 (aged 88)
- Spouses: Catherine Wendell (m. 1922; div. 1936) Tilly Losch (m. 1939; div. 1947)
- Issue: Henry Herbert, 7th Earl of Carnarvon; Lady Penelope van der Woude
- Parents: George Herbert, 5th Earl of Carnarvon; Almina, née Wombwell
- Military career
- Allegiance: United Kingdom
- Branch: British Army
- Service years: 1914–1923; 1940–1945
- Rank: Lieutenant Colonel
- Units: 7th Queen's Own Hussars
- Conflicts: World War I; World War II
- Awards: Bronze Star Medal

Henry George Alfred Marius Victor Francis Herbert, 6th Earl of Carnarvon (7 November 1898 – 22 September 1987), was a British peer. He was the son of George, 5th Earl of Carnarvon, and Almina Wombwell.

== Life ==
Styled Lord Porchester from birth, he described in his memoirs an unloving upbringing by his parents, spending much of his time with his grandmother Marie "Mina" Wombwell (née Boyer). He was educated at Ludgrove School, Eton and Sandhurst. During the First World War he served with the 7th Queen's Own Hussars in India and Mesopotamia, remaining in the army after the war.

He inherited the Earldom of Carnarvon in April 1923 on the death of his father – who had funded archaeologist Howard Carter's search for the tomb of Tutankhamun. The new earl's view of the suggested 'Curse of Tutankhamun' was that "however sceptical I might have been, I could not dismiss the matter out of hand", claiming that the moment his father died on 5 April in Egypt, the family dog howled and died a sympathetic death at Highclere Castle, the family seat. On becoming Earl, he took on responsibility for the upkeep of Highclere Castle and its 4,000 acre estate. His mother remarried only eight months after the death of her first husband.

In March 1940, Lord Carnarvon re-joined the 7th Hussars as a lieutenant. During the Second World War he held a number of staff positions in England, rising to the rank of Lieutenant-Colonel. In 1948 he was awarded the US Bronze Star Medal.

While Lord Carnarvon's pursuits included fox hunting, grouse shooting, and polo, his foremost interest was horse racing. He declared that "racing and breeding is a way of life and I expect I shall continue to the end of my days." He had owned racehorses continuously since the age of 15. He also owned and ran the Highclere Stud, established by his father, which bred many winners, including the 1930 Epsom Derby winner Blenheim. He regularly rode as an amateur rider on the flat. His son, the 7th Earl, having inherited the family love of horses and their breeding, became Queen Elizabeth II's racing manager.

His obituary by Hugh Massingberd described him as a "most uncompromisingly direct ladies' man".

== Marriages and issue ==
Henry Herbert, 6th Earl of Carnarvon married Anne Catherine Tredick Wendell, of New York City, on 17 July 1922 at St Margaret's, Westminster. The daughter of actor Jacob Wendell and sister of Philippa Stewart, Countess of Galloway, they divorced in 1936 after having had two children:

- Henry George Reginald Molyneux Herbert, 7th Earl of Carnarvon (19 January 1924 – 11 September 2001). He married Jean Margaret Wallop, daughter of Hon. Oliver Malcolm Wallop and Jean Moore, on 7 January 1956. They have three children:
  - George Herbert, 8th Earl of Carnarvon (10 November 1956)
  - The Hon. Henry "Harry" Herbert (2 March 1959)
  - Lady Carolyn Herbert (27 January 1962).
- Lady Anne Penelope Marian Herbert (3 March 1925 – 1990). She married her second cousin Captain Reinier Gerrit Anton van der Woude, son of R.A.G van der Woude and his wife Mary Wendell, daughter of Harvard professor Barrett Wendell, on 21 April 1945. They had three children:
  - Michael Gerrit van der Woude (25 March 1946 – 14 January 2008)
  - David Anthony van der Woude (7 November 1947)
  - Penelope Catherine Mary van der Woude (19 August 1952 – 1978).

Following his divorce from Catherine, Lord Carnarvon married Ottilie Ethel Leopoldine Losch, an Austrian dancer with the stage name Tilly Losch, on 1 September 1939. They divorced in 1947.

On his death on 22 September 1987 aged 88, he was succeeded by his son, Henry George Reginald Molyneux Herbert, 7th Earl of Carnarvon.

The 6th Earl had a younger sister, who became Lady Evelyn Beauchamp.

== Publications ==
Late in life he published two books of memoirs:

- No Regrets: Memoirs of the Earl of Carnarvon (1976) Weidenfeld and Nicolson. (ISBN 0297772465)
- Ermine Tales: More Memoirs of the Earl of Carnarvon (1980) Weidenfeld and Nicolson. (ISBN 0297777637)

Peerage of Great Britain
Preceded by George Herbert	Earl of Carnarvon; 1923–1987	Succeeded by Henry George Herbert
