= Jean Herbert, Countess of Carnarvon =

American-born British aristocrat

The Right Honourable The Countess of Carnarvon MBE
- Born: Jean Margaret Wallop; 29 April 1935; Big Horn, Wyoming, U.S.
- Died: 11 April 2019 (aged 83); Highclere, England
- Spouse: Henry Herbert, 7th Earl of Carnarvon (m. 1956; died 2001)
- Children: 3, including George
- Parents: The Hon. Oliver Wallop (father); Jean Moore (mother)
- Relatives: Malcolm Wallop (brother); Oliver Wallop, 8th Earl of Portsmouth (grandfather)

Jean Margaret "Jeanie" Herbert, Countess of Carnarvon, MBE, (née Wallop; 29 April 1935 – 11 April 2019) was an American-born British aristocrat and chatelaine of Highclere Castle.

== Early life and family ==
Jean Margaret Wallop was born on 29 April 1935 in Big Horn, Wyoming, to The Hon. Oliver Malcolm Wallop (1905–1980) and his wife Jean McGinley Moore (1908–1943). Her paternal grandfather Oliver Wallop, 8th Earl of Portsmouth, had emigrated to Wyoming and served in the Wyoming State Legislature before inheriting the British earldom of Portsmouth. Her maternal great-grandfather was American attorney and financier William Henry Moore.

Wallop had two older brothers, including Malcolm Wallop, United States Senator for Wyoming, and one younger sister. Her mother died when she was seven. She was educated at Garrison Forest School before briefly studying nursing at the University of Colorado.

== Marriage and issue ==
In 1954, while visiting family in England, Jean met Henry Herbert, Lord Porchester. They married on 7 January 1956 at St. James' Episcopal Church in Manhattan. They had three children:

- George Reginald Oliver Molyneux Herbert, 8th Earl of Carnarvon (born 10 November 1956)
- The Honourable Henry Malcolm Herbert (born 2 March 1959)
- Lady Carolyn Penelope Herbert (born 27 January 1962)

Jean and her husband, Lord Porchester, who succeeded to the earldom of Carnarvon in 1987, lived at Milford Lake House on the Highclere Castle estate. Lord Porchester (known as "Porchy") was one of Queen Elizabeth II's closest friends and served as her racing manager from 1969 until his death in 2001. The Queen stood as godmother to their eldest son. In 1984, the Queen and Prince Philip made a private visit to her brother's ranch in Wyoming.

In May 1979, she founded the Newbury Spring Festival, a classical music festival in Newbury. She served as the festival's president from its inception until her death. The Earl and Countess of Carnarvon opened Highclere Castle to the public in 1988, displaying treasures the 5th Earl collected during the discovery of the tomb of Tutankhamun. For her services to Newbury, she was made a Member of the Order of the British Empire (MBE) in the 2000 New Year Honours.

Carnarvon died of old age at home on 11 April 2019. Her funeral, held on 25 April 2019 at the Church of St Michael and All Angels, Highclere, was attended by Queen Elizabeth II.

== In popular culture ==
Carnarvon is portrayed by Andrea Deck in season one, episode nine of The Crown.
