= Robert Sawyer (Attorney General) =

English politician (1633–1692)

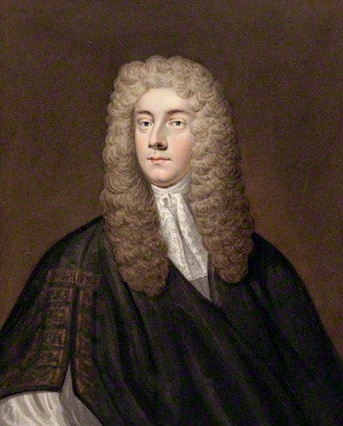
Sir Robert Sawyer.

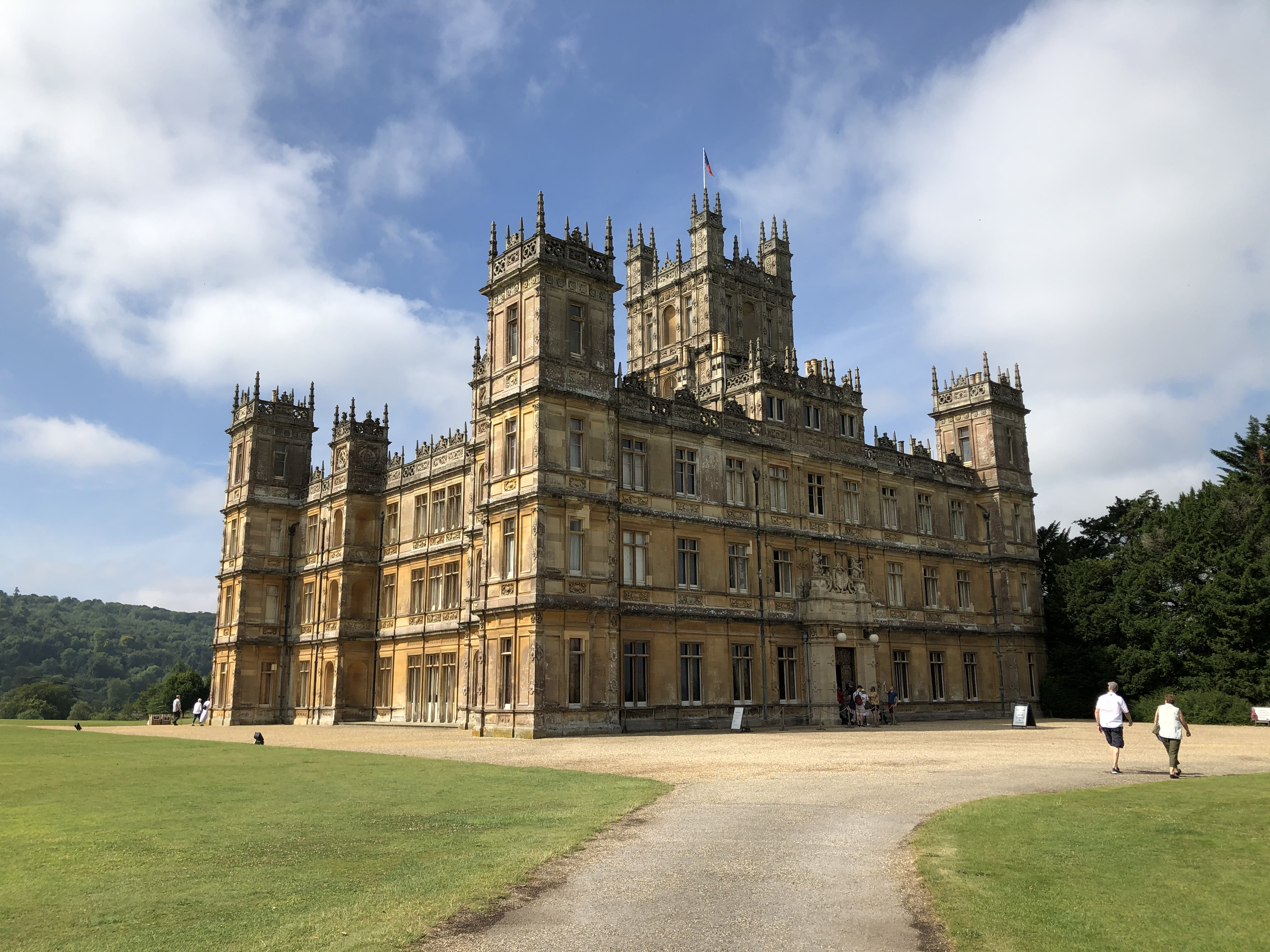
Highclere Castle

Sir Robert Sawyer, of Highclere Castle (1633–1692) was the Attorney General for England and Wales (1681–1687) and, briefly, Speaker of the English House of Commons.

Robert was a younger son of Sir Edmund Sawyer, of Heywood Lodge, at White Waltham, in Berkshire, who was Auditor of the Exchequer. He attended Magdalene College, Cambridge, where he was a contemporary of Samuel Pepys and later became a benefactor of the library there. Upon leaving university, he became a barrister of the Inner Temple and took part in a number of well-known cases. He later became treasurer of Inner Temple.

Sawyer was elected MP for High Wycombe in 1673 and was knighted four years later. He was elected speaker in 1678, but had to resign in under a month because of health problems. Three years later he was made attorney-general. Sir Robert prosecuted members of the Rye House Plot and also Titus Oates. He returned to private practice, and scored a great triumph as defence counsel in the Trial of the Seven Bishops.

Sawyer settled at Highclere in Hampshire where he built the house that preceded the present Highclere Castle. He was elected to Parliament for Cambridge University in 1689 and 1690.

He died at Highclere on 30 July 1692 and was buried in the old church there. He had married Margaret Suckeley and had one daughter, Margaret Sawyer, who married Thomas Herbert, 8th Earl of Pembroke. Their descendants the Earls of Carnarvon eventually inherited Highclere Castle. He also had a son George, and through George's daughter Catherine was ancestor of the Marquess of Anglesey.

Political offices
Preceded by Sir Edward Seymour	Speaker of the House of Commons; 1678	Succeeded by Sir Edward Seymour
