= Highclere Castle Gin =

Premium gin brand in United States

Highclere Castle Gin is a brand of gin brand produced by Highclere Castle Spirits, LLC from Highclere Castle in Hampshire, England. Launched in 2019, the gin used blended botanicals grown on the grounds with traditional gin distillation methods. Highclere Castle Gin is the first gin to earn a perfect score, 100 points from the Major League Spirits Association (MLSA). The company maintains offices at Highclere Castle and is headquartered in Essex, Connecticut.

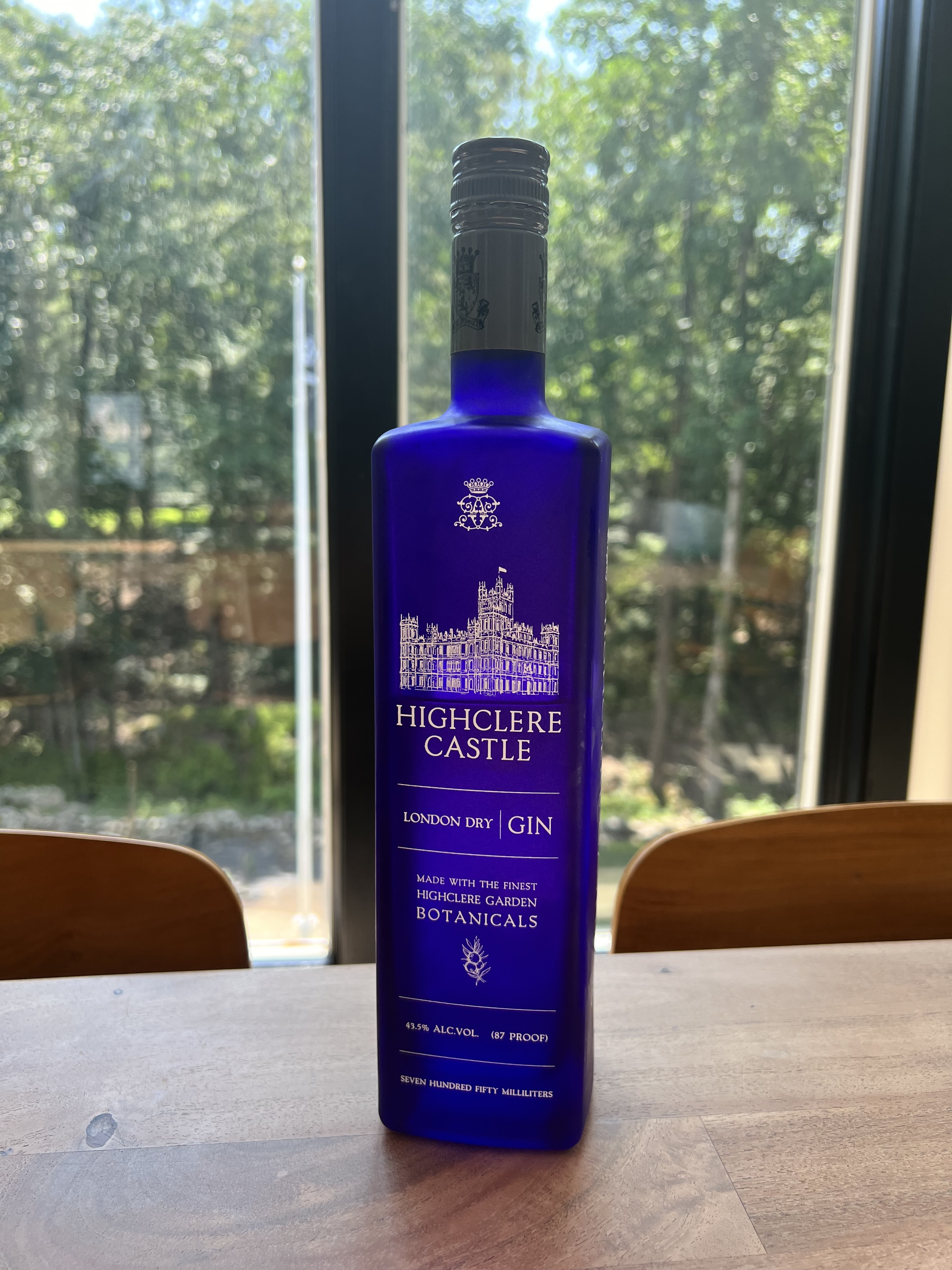
Highclere Castel Gin bottle

== History ==
Highclere Castle Gin was founded by entrepreneur, Adam von Gootkin who previously owned Onyx Moonshine located in Connecticut. Von Gootkin launched Highclere Castle Gin with the 8th Earl & Countess of Carnarvon, who sought to create a spirit from "the essence of Highclere’s storied landscape."

Highclere Castle Gin has formed partnerships with various luxury brands and organizations. Notable collaborations include limited-edition releases and special events held at Highclere Castle. The brand also supports charitable initiatives, having selected the Queen's Commonwealth Trust as its official charity in 2022.

The cocktail King Charles was invented by Highclere Castle Gin to honor the coronation of King Charles III in May 2023. In early 2024, the brand was the liquor sponsor for the prestigious King's Trust Gala in New York City.

== Distribution and Marketing ==
Highclere Castle Gin is available in markets worldwide, including the United States, United Kingdom, and Europe. The company was the first spirits company to accept payment from a distributor in Bitcoin. The brand went viral at the beginning of the COVID-19 pandemic for hosting virtual cocktail parties at Highclere Castle on social media, with Forbes Magazine claiming over 100,000 virtual attendees.

In July 2024, it was announced that Highclere Castle Gin would be available for purchase in Italy.

== Awards ==
Highclere Castle Gin has won numerous awards, most notably a gold medal at the Bartender Spirits Awards in 2023 and named the best Gin in the UK at the Great British Food Awards in 2023
