= Malcolm Wallop =

American politician (1933–2011)

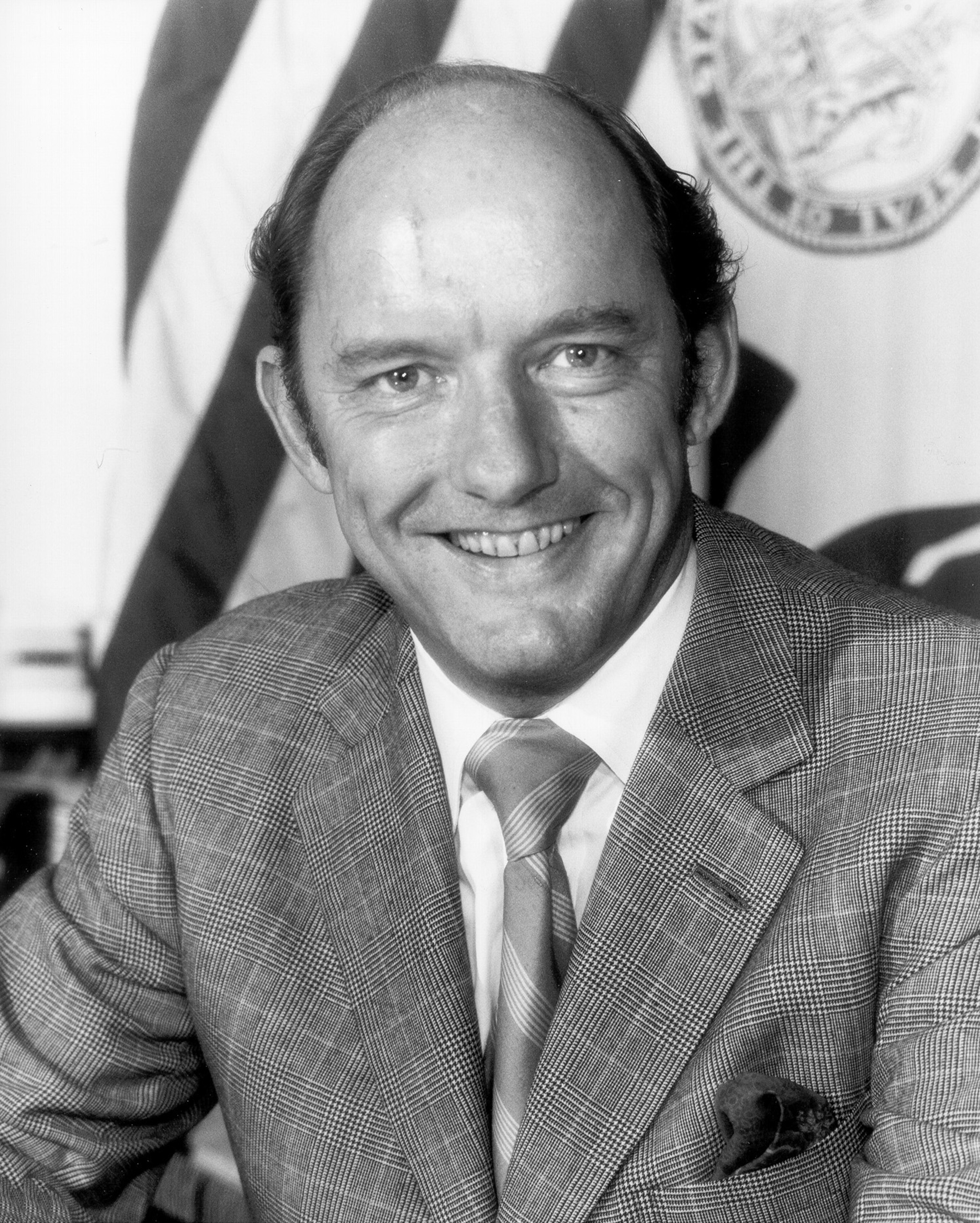

United States Senator from Wyoming
- In office January 3, 1977 – January 3, 1995
- Preceded by: Gale W. McGee
- Succeeded by: Craig L. Thomas

Personal details
- Born: February 27, 1933 New York City, New York, U.S.
- Died: September 14, 2011 (aged 78) Sheridan County, Wyoming, U.S.
- Party: Republican
- Spouses: Vail Stebbins (m. 1956; div. 1965); Judith Warren (m. 1967; div. 1981); French Carter Gamble Goodwyn (m. 1984; div. 2001); Isabel Thomasson Ferguson (m. 2005)
- Children: 4
- Relatives: Jean Herbert (sister); Oliver Wallop (grandfather)
- Education: Yale University (BA)

Malcolm Wallop (February 27, 1933 – September 14, 2011) was an American rancher and politician. A member of the Republican Party, he served as a United States Senator from Wyoming for three terms from 1977 to 1995, after three terms in the Wyoming Legislature.

== Early years ==
Wallop was born at Doctors Hospital in Manhattan, New York City, on February 27, 1933. He was the second son of Jean Moore Wallop and the Hon. Oliver Malcolm Wallop. His paternal grandfather, Wyoming cattle rancher Oliver Henry Wallop, immigrated to the United States from England in the late 19th century and inherited the Earldom of Portsmouth. His maternal great-grandfather was American lawyer, jurist, financier and industrialist William Henry Moore.

Wallop attended public schools in Big Horn, Wyoming. He then attended the Cate School in Carpinteria, California.

After graduating from the Cate School, Wallop attended Yale University where he was a member of St. Anthony Hall. Following his graduation from Yale with a B.A. in 1954, he served in the U.S. Army as a first lieutenant from 1955 to 1957.

== Career ==
After his discharge from the Army, Wallop began cattle ranching in Wyoming. He entered politics in 1969 as a successful candidate for the Wyoming House of Representatives. He served two terms, from 1969 to 1972, followed by one term in the Wyoming State Senate from 1973 to 1976.

In 1974, Wallop sought the Republican gubernatorial nomination, but was defeated in the primaries.

=== Senate ===
In 1976 Wallop successfully unseated three-term Democratic U.S. Senator Gale W. McGee, winning 55 percent of the vote to obtain a seat in the United States Senate.

He made a campaign pledge to serve only two terms, although he went on to serve three. During his Senate tenure, Wallop supported strong national security, tax reform (including reductions in estate and gift taxes), and other elements of Reagan conservatism.

While in the Senate, Wallop served on the Senate Judiciary Committee, Energy and Natural Resources Committee, and Select Committee on Intelligence. From 1981 to 1983, he served as chairman of the Senate Select Committee on Ethics.

In his first term, Wallop authored the legislation that established the Congressional Award program to recognize outstanding volunteerism among America's youth. The 1977 Wallop Amendment to the Surface Mining Control Act was hailed by property rights advocates for forcing the federal government to compensate property owners whose ability to mine was undercut by regulation. Three years later, Wallop successfully amended the Clean Water Act to protect states' interests.

His bill to cut inheritance and gift taxes in 1981 was a key component of President Ronald Reagan's tax reform package and is remembered as one of the most substantive changes to tax policy that decade, and four years earlier, Wallop was partially responsible for phasing out President Jimmy Carter's windfall profits tax.

In 1977, Wallop was one of nine Senators to vote against the Senate adopting a stringent code of ethics intended to assist with the restoration of public confidence in Congress.

In 1982, Wallop was re-elected by a 14-point margin over Democrat Rodger McDaniel, a Wyoming state legislator. In his second term, Wallop supported the 1983 Strategic Defense Initiative, a proposed missile defense system intended to protect the United States from attack from nuclear intercontinental ballistic missiles and submarine-launched ballistic missiles.

In 1988, Wallop won his final term by just 1,322 votes over his opponent, Democratic state senator John Vinich. Wallop's last term was characterized largely by his participation in the foreign policy and trade debates of the late 1980s and early 1990s. He was a member of the Helsinki Commission and traveled extensively in Eastern Europe and the former Soviet Union as an arms control negotiator. Wallop was also a strong advocate of the General Agreement on Tariffs and Trade (GATT) and U.S. participation in the World Trade Organization.

From 1990 to 1994, he was the ranking Republican member of the Senate Energy and Natural Resources Committee, and in 1992, was a key force behind passage of the far-reaching Energy Policy Act.

In 1994, Wallop opted out of a race for a fourth term. He was succeeded by Republican Craig Thomas. Upon his retirement from the Senate, The Economist wrote of Wallop: "Although his detractors have steadily grown in number, even Democrats grudgingly admitted to liking his candor and his willingness to be stupendously politically incorrect."

=== Post-Senate career ===
After his retirement from the Senate in January 1995, Wallop founded the Frontiers of Freedom Institute, a Virginia-based non-profit group that lobbies for constitutionally limited government and a strong national defense.

In 1996, Wallop served as General Chairman and Executive Director of the Steve Forbes presidential campaign, which succeeded in winning primary victories in Delaware and Arizona.

== Publications ==
- Wallop, Malcolm. "The Environment: Air, Water & Public Lands," In A Changing America: Conservatives View the 80s from the United States Senate, edited by Paul Laxalt and Richard S. Williamson, pp. 133–56. South Bend, Ind.: Regnery/Gateway, 1980.
- Wallop, Malcolm, and Angelo Codevilla. The Arms Control Delusion. San Francisco: ICS Press, 1987

== Honors ==
- In 2010, the University of Wyoming established the Malcolm Wallop Fund for Conversations on Democracy to support speaker and workshops for students.
- The University of Wyoming houses Wallop's papers in its American Heritage Center.

== Personal life ==
Wallop was married four times: He married Vail Stebbins in 1956. They had three sons and one daughter before divorcing in 1965. He married Judith Warren in 1967; divorced in 1981. Next, he married French Carter Gamble Goodwyn in 1984; they divorced in 2001. Finally, he married Isabel Brooke Thomasson Ferguson in 2005.

His sister, Jean, married Henry Herbert, 7th Earl of Carnarvon in 1956. Lord Carnarvon was a childhood friend of Queen Elizabeth II and was in 1969 appointed her horse racing manager. Queen Elizabeth II was a house guest of Wallop at Canyon Ranch in Big Horn, Wyoming, in 1984 during the Queen's visit to the United States with Lord and Lady Carnarvon (née Jean Wallop, the Senator's sister).

Wallop was an uncle of George Herbert, 8th Earl of Carnarvon, whose family seat in England, Highclere Castle, has achieved prominence as a filming location for the ITV television series Downton Abbey.

Wallop died at his home near Big Horn on September 14, 2011, at the age of 78.

Party political offices
Preceded by John S. Wold	Republican nominee for U.S. Senator from Wyoming (Class 1); 1976, 1982, 1988	Succeeded by Craig L. Thomas
Preceded by Jim McClure	Chair of the Senate Republican Steering Committee; 1989–1995	Succeeded by Larry Craig
U.S. Senate
Preceded by Craig L. Thomas	U.S. Senator (Class 1) from Wyoming; 1977–1995; Served alongside: Clifford Hansen, Alan Simpson	Succeeded by Gale McGee
Preceded by Harrison Schmitt	Vice Chair of the Senate Ethics Committee; 1979–1981	Succeeded by Howell Heflin
Preceded by Howell Heflin	Chair of the Senate Ethics Committee; 1981–1983	Succeeded by Ted Stevens
Preceded by Jim McClure	Ranking Member of the Senate Energy Committee; 1991–1995	Succeeded by J. Bennett Johnston
