= Angelo Codevilla =

Italian political philosopher (1943–2021)

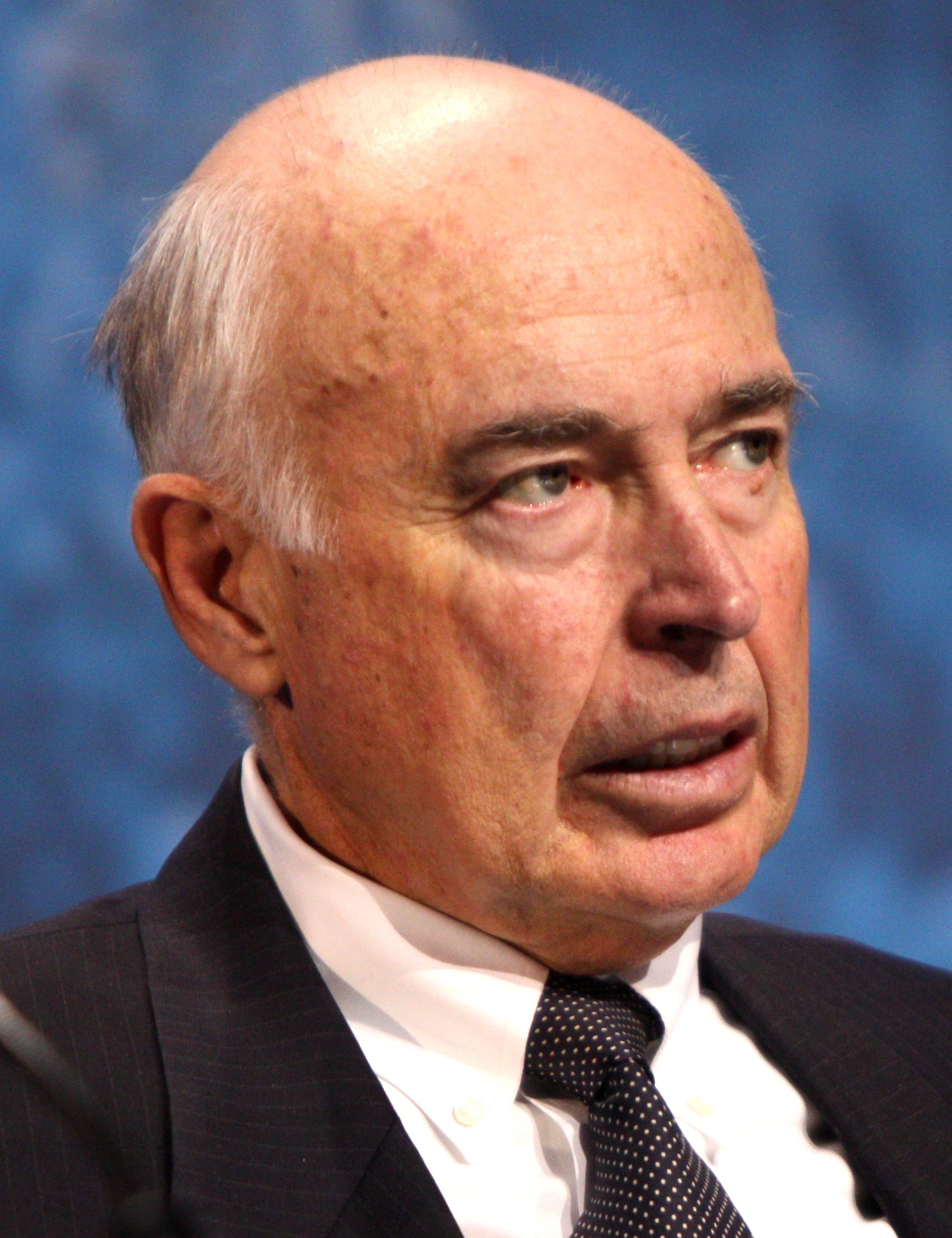
- Born: Angelo Maria Codevilla; May 25, 1943; Voghera, Italy
- Died: September 20, 2021 (aged 78); Tracy, California, U.S.
- Awards: Churchill Fellowship (1975)

Education
- Education: Rutgers University, New Brunswick (BA); University of Notre Dame (MA); Claremont University Center (PhD)

Philosophical work
- School: International relations theory Western philosophy
- Website: University site Hoover site

Angelo Maria Codevilla (May 25, 1943 – September 20, 2021) was an Italian American professor of international relations at what is now the Pardee School of Global Studies at Boston University. He served as a United States Navy officer, a foreign service officer, and professional staff member of the Select Committee on Intelligence of the United States Senate. Codevilla's books and articles range from French and Italian politics to the thoughts of Machiavelli and Montesquieu to arms control, war, the technology of ballistic missile defenses, and a broad range of international topics. Articles by Codevilla have appeared in Commentary, Foreign Affairs, National Review, and The New Republic. His op-eds have appeared in The New York Times, The Wall Street Journal, The American Spectator and The Washington Post. He has also been published in Political Science Reviewer, Intercollegiate Review, and Politica.

== Early life and education ==
Angelo Maria Codevilla was born on May 25, 1943, in Voghera, Italy, son of Angelo (a businessman) and Serena (Almangano) Codevilla. He emigrated to the United States in 1955, and became a United States citizen in 1962.

He graduated from Rutgers University in 1965, having studied natural sciences, languages, and politics. After receiving a Ph.D. in 1973 from Claremont University Center, Codevilla began to teach political science.

== Career ==
In 1977, Codevilla joined the U.S. Foreign Service but quickly transitioned to Capitol Hill, where he served on the staff of the U.S. Senate Select Committee on Intelligence as an aide to Senator Malcolm Wallop, a position he would hold until 1985. During this time, he also began teaching political philosophy at Georgetown University.

By 1980, Codevilla was appointed to the teams preparing the presidential transition for the United States Department of State and the Central Intelligence Agency. His contributions to national security included helping to conceive the technology programs that, in 1983, were relabeled the Strategic Defense Initiative. Throughout his time in government, Codevilla published on intelligence and national security and taught.

In 1985 Codevilla returned to full-time academic life as a senior research fellow at the Hoover Institution, Stanford University. He was professor of international relations at what is now the Pardee School of Global Studies at Boston University from 1995 to 2008.

== Political and social views ==
Codevilla held conservative views, advocating non-interference by government in public life.

== Pollard case ==
While acknowledging that Jonathan Pollard was guilty of espionage, Codevilla was one of many who publicly objected on procedural and substantive grounds to the life sentence given the convicted Israeli spy. In 1984, Pollard had sold numerous closely guarded state secrets, including the National Security Agency's ten-volume manual on how the U.S. gathers its signal intelligence, and disclosed the names of thousands of people who had cooperated with U.S. intelligence agencies. He admitted shopping his services—successfully, in some cases—to other countries. In 1987, he was sentenced to life in prison for violations of the Espionage Act. He was released on November 20, 2015, and moved to Israel.

On November 5, 2013, Codevilla wrote to then-President Barack Obama concerning Pollard. He stated, "Others have pointed out that Pollard is the only person ever sentenced to life imprisonment for passing information to an ally, without intent to harm America, a crime which normally carries a sentence of two to four years; and that this disproportionate sentence in violation of a plea agreement was based not on the indictment but on a memorandum that was never shared with the defense. This is not how American Justice is supposed to work." He further stated that his opinion, as those of DCI James Woolsey, former Attorney general Michael Mukasey, and former Senator Dennis DeConcini, is based on a thorough knowledge of the case. Codevilla concluded, "having been intimately acquainted with the materials that Pollard passed and with the 'sources and methods' by which they were gathered, I would be willing to give expert testimony that Pollard is guilty of neither more nor less than what the indictment alleges."

In a contemporaneous interview with The Weekly Standard, Codevilla said that, "The story of the Pollard case is a blot on American justice", and that the life sentence "makes you ashamed to be an American."

== Personal life and death ==
Codevilla married Ann Marie Blaesser on December 31, 1966. His children are David, Peter, Michael, Elizabeth, and Thomas. He served in the United States Navy Reserve 1969–1971, leaving active duty as a lieutenant, junior grade. He received the Joint Service Commendation Medal. Codevilla died in a car accident in Tracy, California, on September 20, 2021, at the age of 78.

== Selected publications ==
Books

- Codevilla, Angelo M. (1974). Modern France. LaSalle, Illinois: Open Court. ISBN 0875481507. LCCN 74000056.
- Wallop, Malcolm; Codevilla, Angelo M. (1987). The Arms Control Delusion. San Francisco, CA: ICS Press. ISBN 091761691X. LCCN 87022562.
- Codevilla, Angelo M. (1988). The Cure that may Kill: Unintended Consequences of the INF Treaty. London: Alliance for the Institute for European Defence & Strategic Studies. ISBN 0907967930. LCCN 90108095.
- Codevilla, Angelo M. (1988). While Others Build: The Commonsense Approach to the Strategic Defense Initiative. New York: Free Press. ISBN 0029056713. LCCN 87035661.
- Seabury, Paul; Codevilla, Angelo M. (1989). War: Ends and Means. New York: Basic Books. ISBN 0465090672. LCCN 88047897.
- Codevilla, Angelo M. (1992). Informing Statecraft: Intelligence for a New Century. New York: Free Press. ISBN 0029119154. LCCN 91046172.
- Codevilla, Angelo M. (1994). American Security: Back to Basics. Stanford, California: Hoover Institution on War, Revolution, and Peace. ISBN 0817955623. LCCN 94003501.
- Machiavelli, Niccolò (1997) [1532]. Principe [The Prince]. translated and edited by Angelo M. Codevilla; commentary by William B. Allen, Hadley Arkes, Carnes Lord. New Haven: Yale University Press. ISBN 0300064020. LCCN 96050047.
- Codevilla, Angelo M. (1997). The Character of Nations: How Politics Makes and Breaks Prosperity, Family, and Civility (1st ed.). New York: BasicBooks. ISBN 0465082203. LCCN 97020119.
- Codevilla, Angelo M. (2000). Between the Alps and a Hard place: Switzerland in World War II and Moral Blackmail Today. Washington, D.C.: Regnery Publishing. ISBN 089526353X. LCCN 00040308.
- Codevilla, Angelo M. (2005). No Victory, No Peace. Lanham: Rowman & Littlefield. ISBN 0742550028. LCCN 2005011512.
- Codevilla, Angelo M. (2006). Seriousness and Character: The Intellectual History of American Foreign Policy (1st ed.). Yale University Press. ISBN 978-0300108507.
- Codevilla, Angelo M. (2009). The Character of Nations: How Politics Makes and Breaks Prosperity, Family, and Civility (Rev. ed.). New York: Basic Books. ISBN 9780465028009. LCCN 2009000660.
- Codevilla, Angelo M. (2009). Advice to War Presidents: A Remedial Course in Statecraft. New York: Basic Books. ISBN 9780465004836. LCCN 2008035933.
- Codevilla, Angelo M. (2010). A Student's Guide to International Relations. Wilmington, Del.: ISI Books. ISBN 978-1935191919. LCCN 2010020118.
- Codevilla, Angelo M. (2010). The Ruling Class: How They Corrupted America and what We Can Do about it (1st ed.). New York: Beaufort Books. ISBN 9780825305580. LCCN 2010033483.
- Codevilla, Angelo M. (2014). To Make and Keep Peace Among Ourselves and with All Nations. Stanford, California: Hoover Institution Press. ISBN 9780817917142.

Articles

- Codevilla, Angelo M. (July–August 2010). "America's Ruling Class — and the Perils of Revolution". The American Spectator. Archived from the original on July 14, 2015.
- Codevilla, Angelo M. (2011). "The Lost Decade — Sixteen years after 9/11, America has neither peace nor victory". Claremont Review of Books. Vol. XI, no. 4.
- Codevilla, Angelo M. (2016). "The Rise of Political Correctness". Independent Institute.
- Codevilla, Angelo M. (2019). "European Defense". Hoover Institution.
- Codevilla, Angelo M. (2020). "The Original Fascist — From movement to epithet". Claremont Review of Books. Vol. XX, no. 2.

== See also ==
- Soft power
- Smart power
- Missile defense
