= Oliver Wallop, 8th Earl of Portsmouth =

British and American politician

The Right Honourable The Earl of Portsmouth DL

Member of the Wyoming House of Representatives
- In office 1908–1916

Member of the House of Lords
- Lord Temporal
- as a hereditary peer 7 December 1925 – 10 February 1943
- Preceded by: The 7th Earl of Portsmouth
- Succeeded by: The 9th Earl of Portsmouth

Personal details
- Born: Oliver Henry Wallop; 13 January 1861 Eggesford, Devon, England
- Died: 10 February 1943 (aged 82) Colorado Springs, Colorado, US
- Spouse: Marguerite Walker (m. 1897; died 1938)
- Children: Gerard Wallop, 9th Earl of Portsmouth; The Hon. Oliver Wallop
- Parent(s): Isaac Wallop, 5th Earl of Portsmouth; Lady Eveline Herbert

Oliver Henry Wallop, 8th Earl of Portsmouth (13 January 1861 – 10 February 1943), was a Anglo-American peer and also served in the Wyoming State Legislature in the United States.

Wallop was born at Eggesford House in Devon, England, to Isaac Newton Fellowes (later Wallop), 5th Earl of Portsmouth, and Lady Eveline Alicia Juliana Herbert, daughter of Henry Herbert, 3rd Earl of Carnarvon. As the third son, he was not expected to inherit his father's earldom, and in 1883 moved to the American West to become a rancher and stockman. He settled in Miles City, Montana, before coming to Big Horn, Wyoming, and purchasing the Canyon Ranch in 1895. He became a United States citizen in 1904 and, as O. H. Wallop, was first elected to the Wyoming Legislature in 1908, serving two terms as a Republican in the Wyoming House of Representatives.

== Wyoming ==
In 1884, at the age of twenty-eight, Wallop migrated to the United States. With his remittance, he capitalized a horse ranch near Miles City, Montana. Two English-bred stallions, a gift from his father, helped him begin his horse-breeding operation. In 1890, Wallop bought a homestead near Big Horn, Wyoming. There, he began to raise and to train polo ponies and tandem horse teams. He trailed them to the railroad for shipment to the East Coast and to England. Five years later, he bought another ranch at the mouth of Little Goose Creek, named it the Canyon Ranch, and moved his operation there.

In 1899, he partnered with his neighbors, fellow British expatriates William and Malcolm Moncreiffe, in an expanded horse business. At the time, a horse in Wyoming might sell for between five and thirty-nine dollars. Wallop and his partners bought horses at relatively inexpensive prices, trained them, and sold them to the British cavalry for as much as ninety-seven dollars. During the three years of the Second Boer War in what is now South Africa, the operation shipped more than twenty thousand horses. During World War I, Wallop and his partners supplied horses to the British, French, and Italian armies. Wallop himself took the role of horse buyer in Oregon and Washington state. From 1917 to 1919, he served in the British Army in the First World War. In peacetime, Wallop continued to breed and train polo ponies.

== England ==
Wallop's elder brothers, the 6th and 7th earls, both died without male heirs. In 1925, he succeeded as the 8th Earl. Wallop was allowed to take his seat in the House of Lords after first renouncing his American citizenship.

Wallop died in Colorado Springs, Colorado, in 1943, after being ill for a year.

== Marriage and issue ==
Wallop married Marguerite Walker, daughter of Samuel Johnson Walker of Kentucky and Amanda née Morehead (daughter of Governor Charles S. Morehead), and had two sons, Gerard Vernon Wallop and Oliver Malcolm Wallop.

His granddaughter Jean Margaret Wallop, born in Big Horn, Wyoming, married Henry Herbert, 7th Earl of Carnarvon, whose seat was Highclere Castle. She was close friends with Queen Elizabeth II, who was godmother to his great-grandson George Herbert, 8th Earl of Carnarvon. His grandson Malcolm Wallop also served in the Wyoming State Legislature, and three terms in the United States Senate.

Peerage of Great Britain
Preceded by John Fellowes Wallop	Earl of Portsmouth; 1925–1943	Succeeded by Gerard Vernon Wallop
