= George Herbert, 8th Earl of Carnarvon =

British peer

The Right Honourable The Earl of Carnarvon
- Tenure: 11 September 2001–present
- Predecessor: Henry Herbert, 7th Earl of Carnarvon
- Born: George Reginald Oliver Molyneux Herbert; 10 November 1956 (age 69); London, England
- Residence: Highclere Castle
- Spouses: Jayne Wilby (m. 1989; div. 1998) Fiona Aitken (m. 1999)
- Issue: Lady Saoirse Herbert; George Herbert, Lord Porchester; The Hon. Edward Herbert
- Parents: Henry Herbert, 7th Earl of Carnarvon; Jean Wallop

George Reginald Oliver Molyneux Herbert, 8th Earl of Carnarvon (born 10 November 1956), styled Lord Porchester from 1987 to 2001, is a British peer and farmer.

His family seat, Highclere Castle, has achieved notability as the primary filming location for television series Downton Abbey and Jeeves and Wooster. Carnarvon and his family live in part of the house, while the rest is used as a venue for hire and is also open to the public much of the summer and on some dates during other months.

Through his father, he is a descendant of the Lee family of Virginia.

== Early life ==
Herbert was born in Lambeth, London, the son of Henry Herbert, 7th Earl of Carnarvon and an American mother, Jean Margaret Wallop. His mother was born in Big Horn, Wyoming, the granddaughter to Oliver Wallop, 8th Earl of Portsmouth, who had not expected to inherit the title and moved to the American west to become a rancher. His maternal uncle Malcolm Wallop, a rancher in Wyoming, served three terms in the United States Senate. His parents were close friends with Queen Elizabeth II, his godmother. Herbert was a Page of Honour to the Queen. He was educated at Eton and St John's College, Oxford.

He succeeded to the title of Earl of Carnarvon when his father died on 11 September 2001 in Winchester, Hampshire.

== Family ==
On 16 December 1989, he married Jayne M. Wilby, daughter of racehorse owner Kenneth A. Wilby and Princess Prospero Colonna di Stigliano (née Frances Loftus). They had two children before divorcing in 1998:

- Lady Saoirse Herbert (born 2 June 1991)
- George Kenneth Oliver Molyneux Herbert, Lord Porchester (born 13 October 1992), the heir to the titles

Then, on 18 February 1999, he married fashion designer Fiona Jane Mary Aitken, daughter of Ronnie Aitken and Frances Farmer; they have one son:

- The Hon. Edward Herbert (born 10 October 1999)

The current Countess of Carnarvon is also an author who has written two biographies about her predecessors – the first about her husband's great-grandmother, Almina, Countess of Carnarvon, and the second about his grandparents as well as several books on life in the castle. She is the "godmother" for the cruise ship Viking Mars.

== Arms ==
Coat of arms of George Herbert, 8th Earl of Carnarvon
Coronet A Coronet of an Earl Crest A Wyvern with wings elevated Vert holding in the mouth a Sinister Hand couped at the wrist Gules Escutcheon Per pale Azure and Gules three Lions rampant Argent, a crescent argent (mullet) in the chief between the partitions Supporters Dexter: a Panther guardant Argent semée of Torteaux and Hurts flames issuant from the mouth and ears proper; Sinister: a Lion Argent, each ducally gorged per pale Azure and Gules and chained Or and charged on the shoulder with an Ermine Spot Sable Motto UNG JE SERVIRAY ("ONE I WILL SERVE")

Peerage of Great Britain
Preceded by Henry Herbert	Earl of Carnarvon; 2001–present	Incumbent
