= Highclere =

Village and parish in Hampshire, England

Coordinates: 51.344935°N 1.371955°W

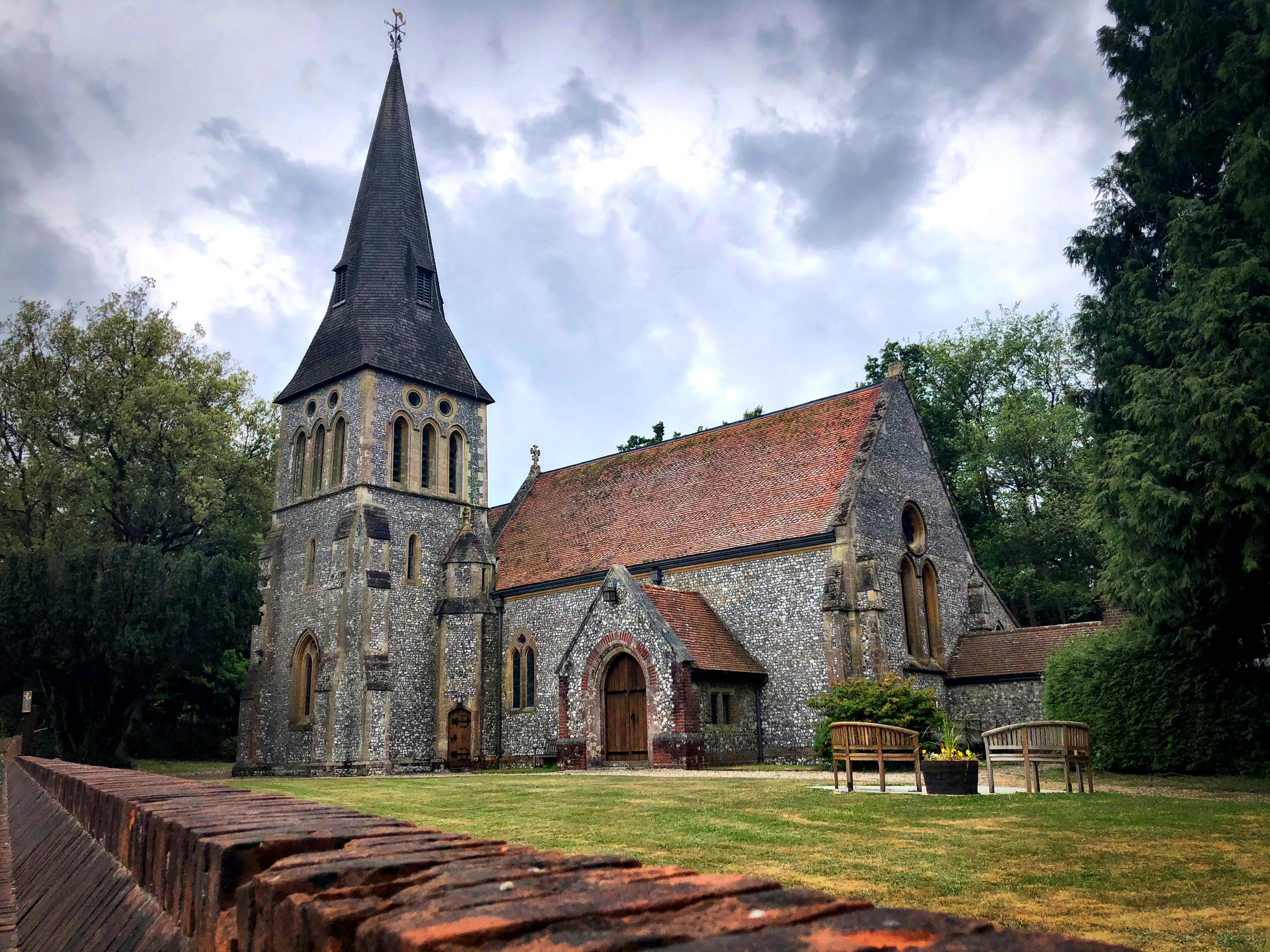
- Parish church of St Michael and All Angels, Highclere

- Location within Hampshire
- Population: 1,606 (2011 Census including Woolton Hill)
- OS grid reference: SU4384060837
- District: Basingstoke and Deane
- Shire county: Hampshire
- Region: South East
- Country: England
- Sovereign state: United Kingdom
- Post town: NEWBURY
- Postcode district: RG20
- Dialling code: 01635
- Police: Hampshire and Isle of Wight
- Fire: Hampshire and Isle of Wight
- Ambulance: South Central
- UK Parliament: North West Hampshire

Highclere (pronounced /ˈhaɪklɪər/) is a village and civil parish in the North Wessex Downs Area of Outstanding Natural Beauty, Hampshire, England, in the northern part of the county, near the Berkshire border. It is famous as the location of Highclere Castle, a Victorian house of the Earl of Carnarvon, and the setting for films and TV series including Downton Abbey.

== History and buildings ==
The parish church of St Michael and All Angels sits between Highclere Castle and the main part of the village. This 'new' church (1870s) replaced a much older church sited adjacent to Highclere Castle, and parish records go back to pre-Norman times.

There is a pub, the Red House, a flourishing village hall and a private junior ('Prep') school, Thorngrove. The church parish is part of the North West Hampshire Benefice (with Ashmansworth, Crux Easton, East Woodhay and Woolton Hill). The civil parish of Highclere has two wards, Highclere and Penwood.

"Highclere Holly" (Ilex altaclerensis) was first identified here and still flourishes in local woodlands.

According to local legend there used to be a grampus living in a yew tree in the churchyard of the Highclere Estate Chapel.

On 22 August 1213, King John stayed at Peter des Roches the Bishop of Winchester's manor at Highclere, then called Bishop's Clere. An itinerary of King Edward II lists him as spending 2 September 1320 there.
