= Earl of Carnarvon =

Earldom in the Peerage of Great Britain

- Creation date: 3 July 1793
- Creation: Third
- Created by: George III
- Peerage: Great Britain
- First holder: Henry Herbert, 1st Baron Porchester
- Present holder: George Herbert, 8th Earl of Carnarvon
- Heir apparent: George Herbert, Lord Porchester
- Remainder to: 1st Earl's heirs male of the body lawfully begotten
- Subsidiary titles: Baron Porchester (17 October 1780)
- Seat: Highclere Castle
- Motto: Ung je serviray ('I will serve but one master')
- Arms: Per pale azure and gules three lions rampant argent a crescent for difference

Earl of Carnarvon is a title that has been created three times in British history. The current holder is George Herbert, 8th Earl of Carnarvon. The town and county in Wales to which the title refers are historically spelled Caernarfon, having been Anglicised to Carnarvon or Caernarvon. The traditional Welsh spelling is itself a modified form of the original name of antiquity, Caer-yn-Arfon, meaning fortification opposite the island of Mona (now called Ynys Môn, or Anglesey in English).

== History ==
The first creation came in the Peerage of England in 1628 in favour of Robert Dormer, 2nd Baron Dormer of Wyng. For more information on this creation, which became extinct in 1709, see the Baron Dormer.

The second creation was in 1714 in the Peerage of Great Britain for James Brydges, 9th Baron Chandos. In 1719 he was further honoured when he was made Marquess of Carnarvon and Duke of Chandos. For more information on this creation, which became extinct in 1789, see the Duke of Chandos.

The third creation was in 1793 in the Peerage of Great Britain for Henry Herbert, 1st Baron Porchester. The precise form of this creation was Earl of the Town and County of Carnarvon, in the Principality of Wales, although in practice only the style of Earl of Carnarvon is used. He had previously represented Wilton in the House of Commons and had already in 1780 been created Baron Porchester, of High Clere in the County of Southampton (also in the Peerage of Great Britain). Herbert was the son of Major-General the Hon. William Herbert, fifth son of Thomas Herbert, 8th Earl of Pembroke. He was succeeded by his eldest son Henry George Herbert, the second Earl, who sat as Whig Member of Parliament for Cricklade.

His eldest son Henry John George Herbert, the third Earl, briefly represented Wootton Bassett in Parliament as a Tory before he succeeded his father in the earldom. His eldest son Henry Howard Molyneux Herbert, the fourth Earl, was a prominent Conservative politician and served as Secretary of State for the Colonies and as Lord Lieutenant of Ireland. He was succeeded by his only son from his first marriage, George Herbert, 5th Earl of Carnarvon, who is noted for discovering the tomb of Tutankhamun along with Howard Carter.

As of 2020, the titles are held by the fifth earl's great-grandson, the eighth Earl, who succeeded in 2001.

Several other members of this branch of the Herbert family may be mentioned. The Very Reverend the Hon. William Herbert, third son of the first Earl, was a clergyman and noted botanist. His son Henry William Herbert was a novelist and writer on sport. Sir Robert George Wyndham Herbert, Permanent Under-Secretary of State for the Colonies from 1871 to 1892, was the son of the Hon. Algernon Herbert, fifth son of the first Earl.

The Hon. Auberon Herbert, second son of the third Earl, was a writer, theorist, and philosopher, and also represented Nottingham in the House of Commons. He married Lady Florence Amabel Cowper, daughter of George Cowper, 6th Earl Cowper and his wife Lady Anne Florence de Grey Cowper, 7th Baroness Lucas of Crudwell. In 1905, their only son Auberon Herbert succeeded his uncle as ninth Baron Lucas of Crudwell (see this title for further history of this branch of the family).

The Hon. Aubrey Herbert, second son of the fourth Earl, was Member of Parliament for South Somerset and for Yeovil. His son Auberon Herbert was an expert on Eastern Europe. His daughter Laura Herbert was the second wife of the novelist Evelyn Waugh and mother of the journalist Auberon Waugh.

== Estates and residences ==
=== Country seat ===
The family seat of the Herbert Earls of Carnarvon is Highclere Castle in Hampshire, which was the filming location for the UK television series Downton Abbey. The traditional burial place of the Herbert Earls of Carnarvon is the Carnarvon Mausoleum, located in the park at Highclere Castle; some other family members are buried in the Herbert Mausoleum at the Church of All Saints, Burghclere.

=== Estates ===
In the 1883 edition of John Bateman's The Great Landowners of Great Britain and Ireland, Henry Herbert, 4th Earl of Carnarvon, was listed as the owner of 35,583 acres in England, which yielded a combined annual income of £37,211. His landholdings included 13,247 acres in Nottinghamshire, 12,800 acres in Somerset, 9,340 acres in Hampshire, 120 acres in Derbyshire, 68 acres in Devon, and eight acres in Wiltshire. On the 4th Earl's death in 1890, his will settled much of his English real estate in trust for the benefit of his successors, with the stated object of maintaining the earldom and the position associated with it.

The 4th Earl’s substantial Nottinghamshire and Derbyshire landholdings had been inherited by his first wife, Lady Evelyn Stanhope, daughter of George Stanhope, 6th Earl of Chesterfield; her brother and only sibling George Stanhope, 7th Earl of Chesterfield, had died childless in December 1871, and she had inherited much of his estate. In 1874 Lady Carnarvon executed a resettlement of the Chesterfield family estates; she died in 1875, after which her inheritance devolved upon her son George Herbert, 5th Earl of Carnarvon.

==== Highclere Castle and Estate ====
Highclere Castle, Hampshire

Highclere Castle in Hampshire has been the principal seat of the Earls of Carnarvon since the title was granted to Henry Herbert, 1st Baron Porchester, in 1793.

Highclere Castle and its estate was purchased in 1679 by Sir Robert Sawyer; following his death in 1692, the estate was inherited by his only surviving child Margaret Sawyer, who had married Thomas Herbert, 8th Earl of Pembroke, in 1684. Margaret’s second son The Hon. Robert Herbert inherited the Highclere Estate from his mother; he died childless in 1769, and bequeathed the Highclere Estate to his nephew Henry Herbert MP, who was later enobled as Baron Porchester in 1780, and raised to the Earldom of Carnarvon in 1793. The house was substantially remodelled for Henry Herbert, 3rd Earl of Carnarvon, by Charles Barry during the 1840s.

By 1883, the 4th Earl’s Hampshire estates comprised 9,340 acres and yielded an estimated annual income of £6,500. The estate itself was supported by income from the family's wider landed portfolio; by the 1920s the family’s Nottinghamshire estates (which had been inherited by George Herbert, 5th Earl of Carnarvon, upon his father’s death in 1890) had become a key source of income. Lord Carnarvon’s Shelford estate was generating over £10,000 annually in rents by 1919, which had increased to £16,675 by 1924; much of this income was derived from a colliery on the Shelford estate, situated near Gedling.

Following the death of George Herbert, 5th Earl of Carnarvon, in 1923, his only son Henry Herbert, 6th Earl of Carnarvon, inherited a life interest in the Highclere estate, although his inheritance was subject to substantial mortgages and an Inheritance Tax bill amounting to over £500,000. At the time of the 5th Earl’s death, the Highclere estate was held under an Entail, although the 6th Earl disentailed the estate on 5 May 1923.

In August 1925, the Carnarvon Estates Company was incorporated, with all but one of its shares held by the Earl. The Earl transferred his life interest in the 6,500-acre Bingham estate in Nottinghamshire, as well as the fee simple of the Highclere estate. In consideration for the transfer of Highclere, he received 85,455 fully paid £1 shares in the Carnarvon Estates Company; he also transferred the Highclere home-farm stock and implements in consideration for a further 4,000 shares. The company assumed the outstanding mortgages and leased Highclere Castle and its grounds back to him on a 21-year lease. The lease also comprised three cottages, Milford Lake House and Siddown Warren Stud Farm (which later became known as the Highclere Stud), amounting to 524 acres in total, for which the Earl paid a half-yearly rent of £573.

The company thereafter began disposing of peripheral portions of the estate. In 1926, approximately 1,021 acres on its eastern side, including several plots suitable for building development, were sold. The disposal realised £22,756 after costs, which was applied towards an outstanding mortgage of £24,205. The company subsequently continued to sell land on the periphery of the estate during the 1930s; in March 1930, Crux Easton Farm was sold for £5,000; in June, Penwood Farm, comprising 61 acres, was sold to its tenant for £900. Great Pen Wood, comprising 198 acres, was sold for £3,850, and the Carnarvon Arms Hotel was sold for £3,250.

In January 1932, amid the continuing economic depression, the company resolved to reduce expenditure across all departments of the estate. Management and miscellaneous expenses were reduced, staffing had already been curtailed, and expenditure on charitable donations and subscriptions was substantially cut. From 1934, the company began distributing its entire annual profits to the 6th Earl as dividends, paying him £2,549 in 1934, £3,137 in 1935 and £3,965 in 1936. By 1936, the acreage of the Highclere estate had been reduced by approximately 45 per cent, while its annual operating loss had fallen from more than £8,000 in 1929 to approximately £4,000 in 1935.

The corporate structure of the Highclere estate also became the subject of litigation concerning the 6th Earl's liability for super-tax during the 1930s.

Following the Earl's divorce from his first wife, Catherine, her settlement provided her with an annuity of £3,000 for life secured upon the Highclere estates. In her 2013 biography of Catherine, Lady Catherine and the Real Downton Abbey, Fiona Herbert, Countess of Carnarvon (second wife of the current Earl, George Herbert, 8th Earl of Carnarvon) asserts that the encumbrance of the Highclere Estate with the 1936 divorce settlement later restricted the 6th Earl's ability to dispose of further substantial estate land, helping to preserve the inheritance of the couple’s son, Henry Herbert, 7th Earl of Carnarvon.

The Highclere estate remains in the possession of the Earls of Carnarvon, and presently comprises approximately 5,000 acres, including around 2,000 acres of arable land, 1,200 acres of parkland and 1,800 acres of woodland and land associated with Highclere Stud.

==== Bingham Estate, Nottinghamshire ====
During the late 19th and early 20th century, the 4th and 5th Earls owned substantial estates in Nottinghamshire, which the 4th Earl’s first wife Evelyn had inherited from her brother George Stanhope, 7th Earl of Chesterfield, in 1871. In 1883, the Earl’s landholdings in Nottinghamshire comprised 13,247 acres, which yielded an annual income of £23,825.

In 1919, the 5th Earl and his son Henry Herbert, Lord Porchester, disentailed and resettled the trust which held the Bingham Estate. Subject to a £1,000 annual jointure for the 5th Earl's wife Almina Herbert, Countess of Carnarvon, the 5th Earl held a life interest, followed by a life interest for the future 6th Earl, followed by the latter's sons successively in tail male. Following the 5th Earl's death in 1923, the 6th Earl therefore became tenant for life. On 10 August 1925 the 6th Earl transferred his life interest in the Bingham Estate to the Carnarvon Estates Company in consideration for 150,000 fully-paid £1 shares.

In September 1925, the 6th Earl sold the 6,500-acre Bingham estate in Nottinghamshire to the Commissioner of Crown Lands; the estate included the villages of Shelford and Saxondale, and part of the township of Bingham; however, under the terms of the 1919 resettlement his interest in the proceeds of the sale was limited to a life-tenancy.

==== Bretby Hall ====
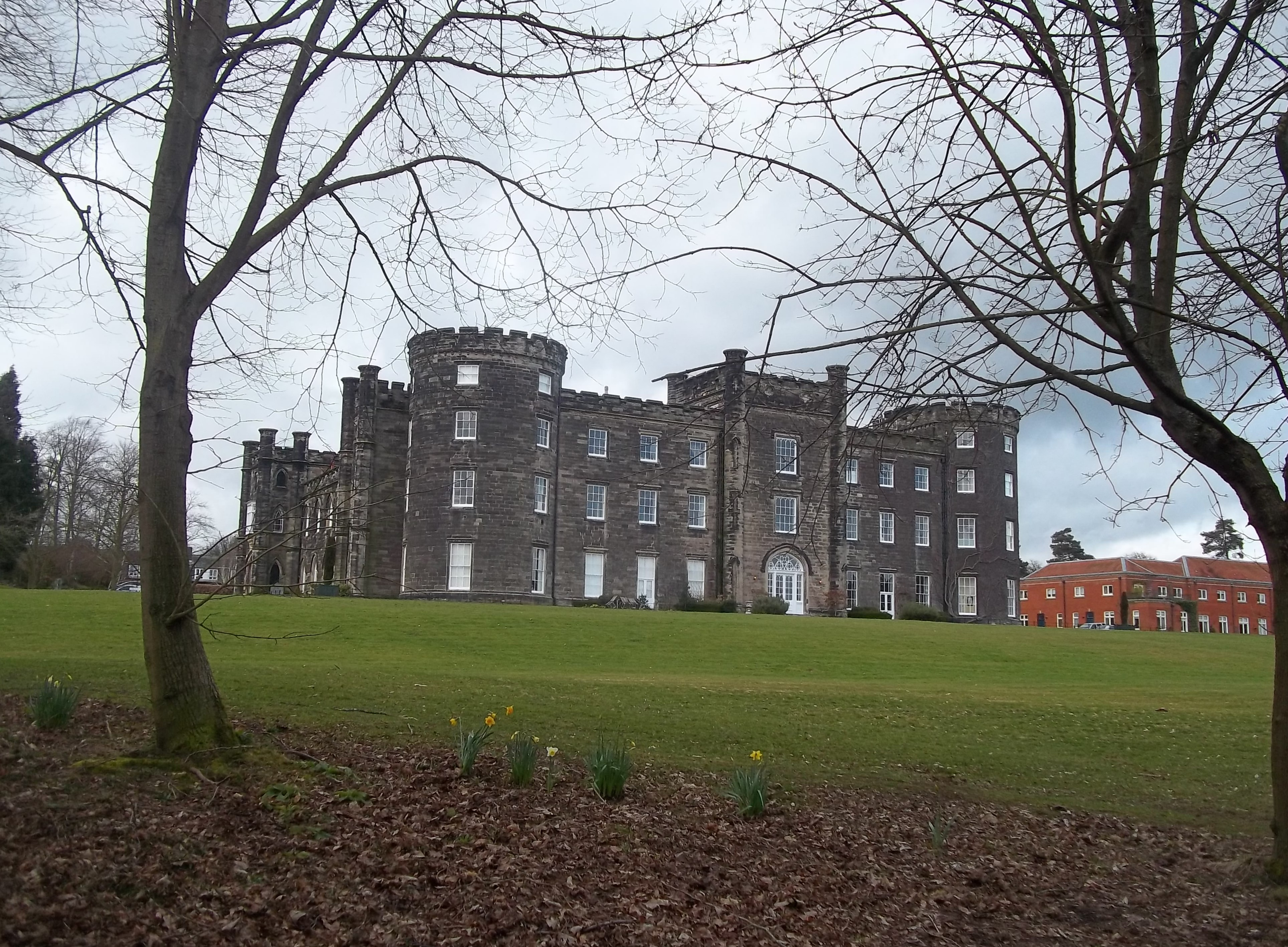
Bretby Hall, Derbyshire

Bretby Hall in Derbyshire also formed part of the inheritance of the Evelyn Herbert, Countess of Carnarvon, first wife of 4th Earl. Lady Carnarvon inherited the Bretby estate in 1871, although the house remained in the occupation of her mother, Anne Stanhope, Dowager Countess of Chesterfield. In the 1883 edition of John Bateman's The Great Landowners of Great Britain and Ireland, the estate was listed as the property of the Dowager Countess of Chesterfield, and then comprised 5,209 acres in Derbyshire and 8 acres in Staffordshire, which produced a combined annual income of £10,760.

The estate subsequently passed to Lady Evelyn's son, the 5th Earl, following her death in 1875. The 5th Earl began disposing of parts of the Bretby property during the early 20th century. The whole of the remaining Bretby estate, then comprising 2,470 acres, was offered for sale by auction in July 1911. Although 78 acres of smaller lots were individually sold at the auction for a cumulative £2,745, the main lot, which comprised 1,614 acres yielding £1,235 annually, as well as Bretby Hall and Park, was withdrawn when bidding failed to exceed £39,000.

In 1915, Bretby Hall and its park, then comprising approximately 1,220 acres, were sold to John Downing Wragg MP.

==== Pixton Park ====
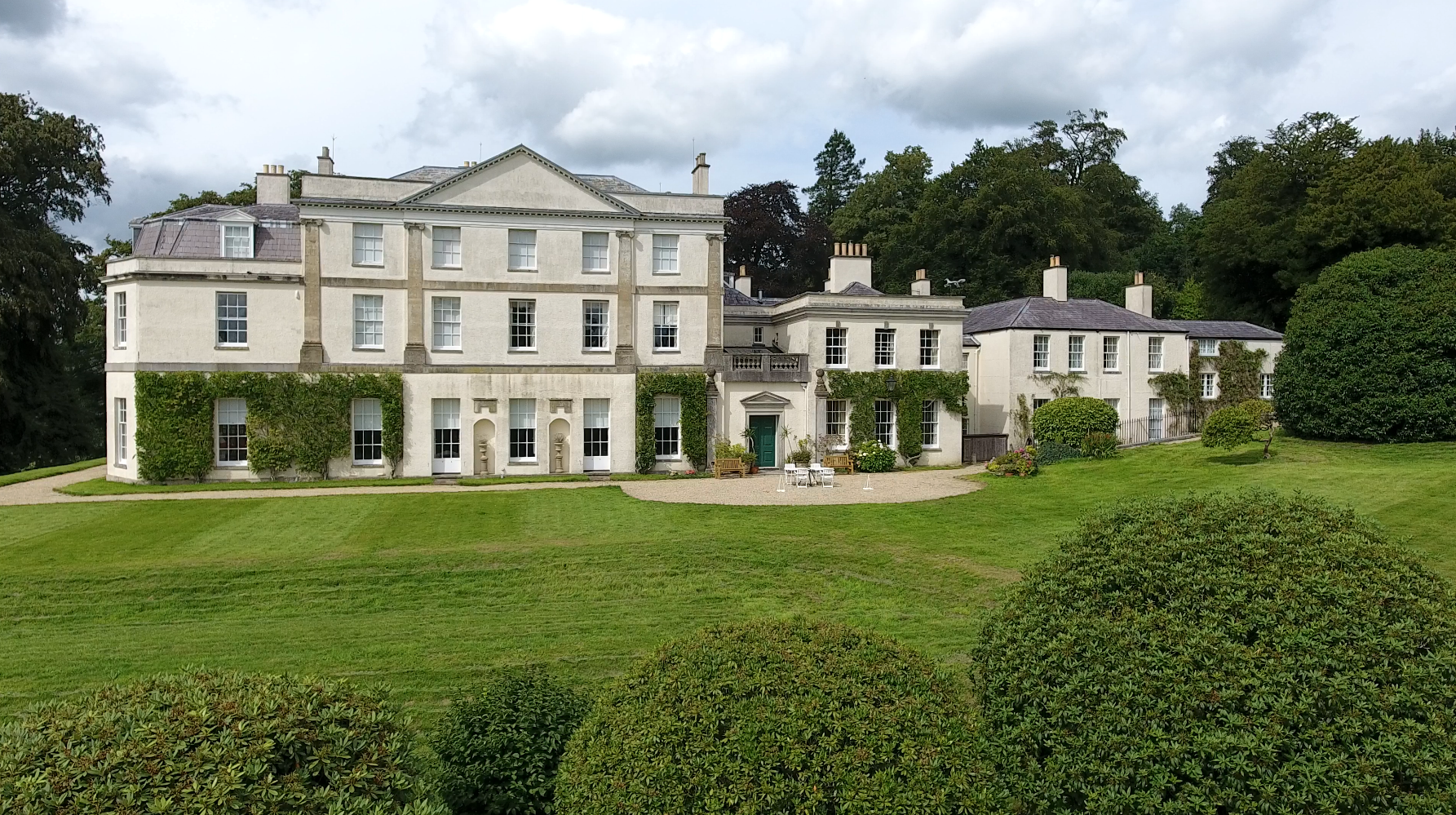
Pixton Park, Somerset

Pixton Park in Somerset passed into the Herbert family through the 1796 marriage of Henry Herbert, 2nd Earl of Carnarvon, then styled Lord Porchester, to Kitty Acland, daughter and heiress of John Dyke Acland. Pixton became the family's principal Somerset residence, and the 4th Earl substantially altered the house in 1870, adding a west wing and remodelling its entrance and service accommodation.

By 1883, the Carnarvon family's Somerset estates comprised approximately 12,800 acres and yielded an annual income of £6,654. Around the turn of the 20th century the 5th Earl sold the Pixton Estate, then comprising the manor house and some 5,000 acres, to his stepmother Elizabeth "Elsie" Herbert, Dowager Countess of Carnarvon. In 1902, the 5th Earl of Carnarvon sold most of the house’s contents at auction.

Elsie subsequently gave Pixton to her elder son, the Hon. Aubrey Herbert, and the property eventually passed to his descendants.

==== Tetton House ====
Tetton House, Somerset

Tetton House in Somerset also derived from the inheritance of the 2nd Earl of Carnarvon’s wife Kitty Acland, but followed a separate descent from Pixton Park. Tetton had belonged to Thomas Dyke and passed to his daughter Elizabeth, wife of Sir Thomas Dyke Acland, 7th Baronet. Following the deaths of their son John Dyke Acland and his widow Lady Harriet Acland, Tetton passed to Lady Harriet's younger grandson the Hon. Edward Herbert, second son of the 2nd Earl of Carnarvon.

Following Edward Herbert's death in 1852, the estate descended to his only surviving son Edward Henry Charles Herbert. After the latter's death in 1870, Tetton passed to his first cousin the Hon. Alan Herbert, second son of the 3rd Earl of Carnarvon. Tetton House was subsequently advertised to let in 1871, at which time the estate comprised approximately 1,000 acres.

The Hon. Alan Herbert died in 1907, and bequeathed the Tetton Estate to his nephew the Hon. Mervyn Herbert, third son of the 4th Earl of Carnarvon. The house was substantially remodelled and enlarged for Mervyn in 1924–26.

=== Villa Altachiara, Portofino ===
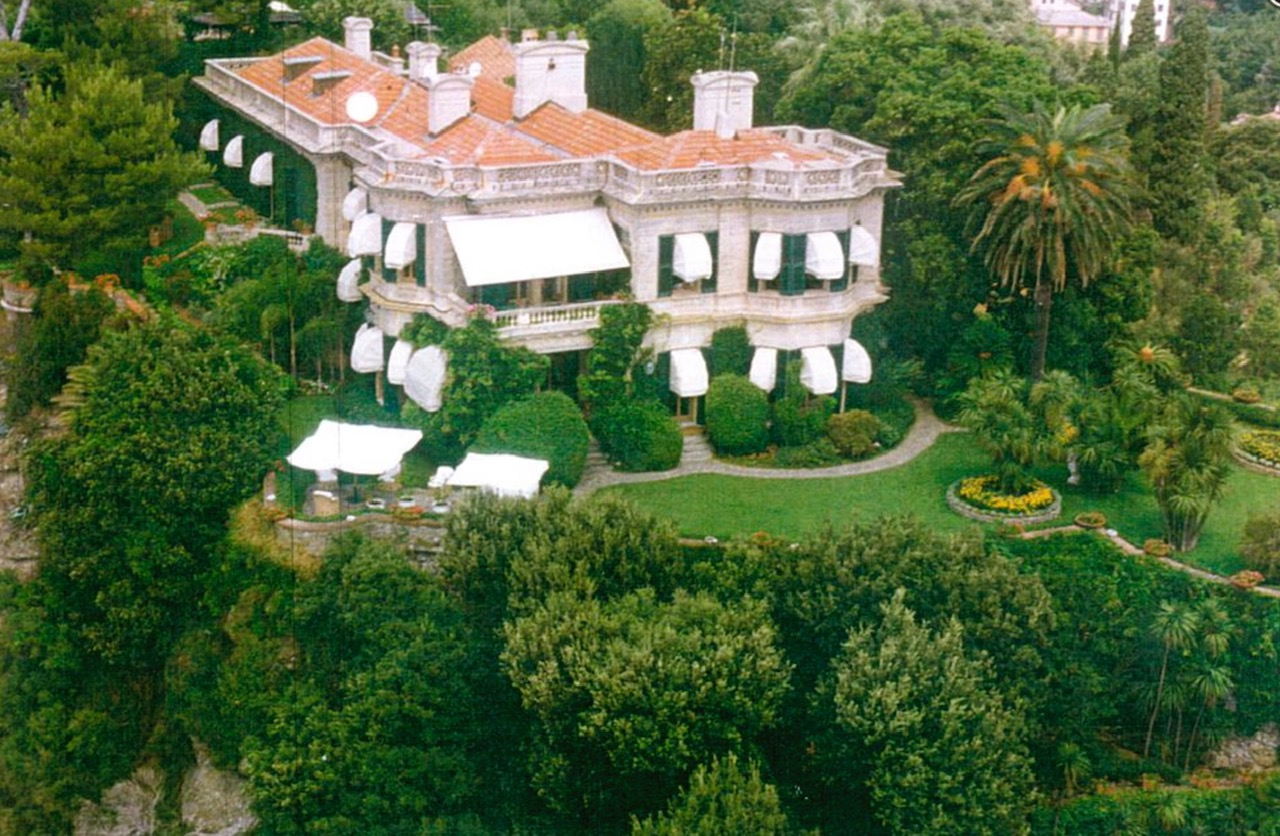
Villa Altachiara, Portofino

During the second half of the 19th century Henry Herbert, 4th Earl of Carnarvon oversaw the construction of Villa Altachiara, a seaside mansion in Portofino on the Italian Riviera. The 4th Earl had first visited Portofino in 1870 and subsequently acquired substantial areas of vineyards and olive groves on the ridge overlooking the town. He commissioned a villa on the summit, designed in a Florentine style, which was completed by 1884 together with its terraced gardens. The Italian Ministry of Culture dates the construction of Villa Altachiara to 1874–1884. Its name, Alta Chiara, was an Italian rendering of "Highclere".

Following the 4th Earl's death in 1890, the villa passed to his widow Elizabeth "Elsie" Herbert, Dowager Countess of Carnarvon; she retained ownership of the villa until her own death in 1929. In her will, she bequeathed Villa Altachiara to her grandson Auberon Herbert. The house continued to be visited and used by members of the Herbert family until it was sold by Auberon Herbert to an Italian industrialist in October 1961.

=== London houses ===
In 1776 Henry Herbert, Baron Porchester (later 1st Earl of Carnarvon), purchased No. 4 Tenterden Street, Hanover Square, which became his London residence for the remainder of his life. His son Henry Herbert, 2nd Earl of Carnarvon, later leased the property to the Royal Academy of Music. Following the 1st Earl's death in 1811, his widow Elizabeth Herbert, Dowager Countess of Carnarvon leased No. 28 Grosvenor Street from 1813 until her own death in 1826.

Prior to his father’s death, the 2nd Earl (who then used the family’s courtesy title Lord Porchester) leased No. 43 Grosvenor Square (later re-numbered as No. 48) in 1800. He retained the lease until 1825, before leasing the house again from 1827 until his death in 1833. His son, Henry Herbert, 3rd Earl of Carnarvon, inherited leasehold of 43 Grosvenor Square from his father, and continued to use the house as his London residence until his own death in 1849.

Following his succession to the family titles and estates, his son Henry Herbert, 4th Earl of Carnarvon did not immediately establish a permanent residence in London. By 1862 he and his wife had leased 17 Bruton Street, Mayfair, where the Countess gave birth to a stillborn son. They were still residing in Bruton Street in February 1863, and during the following year took a house in Lower Grosvenor Street for the London season. From 1865 until 1872 Lord Carnarvon's London residence was No. 66 Grosvenor Street, Mayfair.

In early 1873 the 4th Earl purchased the remaining term of the lease of No. 16 Bruton Street from Granville Leveson-Gower, 2nd Earl Granville. He continued to lease the house until c. June 1881; by late October of the same year he had sold the lease to Henry Oppenheim. By March 1882 he had established his London residence at No. 43 Portman Square, which remained as his London residence until his death in 1890.

Following his succession to the earldom in 1890, the 5th Earl established his London household at No. 13 Berkeley Square in September 1891. The house remained the Earl's London residence until 1918, when it was sold and the Earl and Countess transferred their household to No. 1 Seamore Place, near Park Lane. The 5th Earl's wife Almina Herbert, Countess of Carnarvon had inherited the freehold and contents of 1 Seamore Place from her godfather (and likely biological father) Alfred de Rothschild following the latter’s death on 31 January 1918. Almina continued to live at 1 Seamore Place following the death of the 5th Earl in 1923; the house was later offered for sale in June 1929; and it remained on the market until after March 1930. The house was advertised as "one of the finest small mansions in London", containing a reception hall, six reception rooms, a library, study, 6 principle bed and dressing rooms, ten secondary and staff bedrooms, five bathrooms, and staff offices.

Following the divorce of Henry Herbert, 6th Earl of Carnarvon and his first wife Catherine, Countess of Carnarvon, the latter used part of her generous divorce settlement to purchase a new home at No. 11 Wilton Crescent in Belgravia in late 1936. She retained ownership of the property until c. 1944, when she moved to an apartment, No. 5 Berkeley House, Hay Hill in Mayfair.

== Earl of Carnarvon, first creation (1628) ==
Arms of Dormer: Azure, ten billets or 4,3,2,1 issuant from a chief of the second a demi-lion rampant sable langued gules

- see the Baron Dormer

== Earl of Carnarvon, second creation (1714) ==
- see the Duke of Chandos

== Earl of Carnarvon, third creation ==
=== Baron Porchester (1780) ===
- Henry Herbert, 1st Baron Porchester (1741–1811), was created Earl of Carnarvon in 1793

=== Earl of Carnarvon (1793) ===
Arms of Herbert, undifferenced

- Henry Herbert, 1st Earl of Carnarvon (1741–1811)
- Henry George Herbert, 2nd Earl of Carnarvon (1772–1833)
- Henry John George Herbert, 3rd Earl of Carnarvon (1800–1849)
- Henry Howard Molyneux Herbert, 4th Earl of Carnarvon (1831–1890)
- George Edward Stanhope Molyneux Herbert, 5th Earl of Carnarvon (1866–1923), bankroller of the discovery of Tutankhamun's tomb.
- Henry George Alfred Marius Victor Francis Herbert, 6th Earl of Carnarvon (1898–1987)
- Henry George Reginald Molyneux Herbert, 7th Earl of Carnarvon (1924–2001)
- George Reginald Oliver Molyneux Herbert, 8th Earl of Carnarvon (born 1956)

As of 2025, the heir apparent is the present holder's elder son, George Kenneth Oliver Molyneux Herbert, Lord Porchester (born 1992).

The 8th Earl of Carnarvon was the heir presumptive to the earldom of Pembroke and the earldom of Montgomery until the birth of Reginald Henry Michael, Lord Herbert, to William Herbert, 18th Earl of Pembroke, on 21 October 2012. The 8th Earl of Carnarvon is currently third in line to those titles.

=== Family tree ===
Pembroke and Montgomery family tree

Lord of Striguil (2nd creation), c. 1155; Earl of Pembroke (1st creation), 1138
Dermot MacMurrough c. 1100–c. 1171; King of Leinster | Gilbert de Clare; 1100–1147; 1st Earl of Pembroke, etc. | Isabel de Beaumont former mistress of Henry I c. 1068–1135; King of England
Aoife MacMurrough c. 1153–c. 1188 | Richard de Clare; Strongbow; 1130–1176; 2nd Earl of Pembroke, etc.
Earl of Pembroke (2nd creation) and Lord of Striguil (3rd creation), 1199
Hugh X of Lusignan c. 1183–1249; Count of La Marche | Isabella c. 1186/1188 – 1246; Countess of Angoulême | John; 1166/1667 – 1216; King of England | William Marshal; 1146/1147 – 1219; 1st Earl of Pembroke, etc. | Isabel de Clare; 1172–1220; 4th Earl of Pembroke, etc. suo jure | Gilbert de Clare; 1173–1185; 3rd Earl of Pembroke, etc.
Earldom of Pembroke and lordship of Striguil transferred to her husband, 1199
Eleanor of England; 1215–1275 | William Marshal; 1190–1231; 2nd Earl of Pembroke, etc. | Richard Marshal c. 1191 – 1234; 3rd Earl of Pembroke, etc. | Gilbert Marshal d. 1241; 4th Earl of Pembroke, etc. | Walter Marshal c. 1199 – 1245; 5th Earl of Pembroke, etc. | Ansel Marshal d. 1245; 6th Earl of Pembroke | Joan Marshal d. 1234
Earldom of Pembroke (2nd creation) and lordship of Striguil extinct, 1245
Earl of Pembroke (3rd creation), 1247
William de Valence c. 1225–1296; 1st Earl of Pembroke | Joan de Munchensi c. 1230–1301; Countess of Pembroke, suo jure
Isabel de Valence d. 1305 m. John Hastings, 1st Baron Hastings; 1262–1312/1313; Baron Hastings | Aymer de Valence c. 1270–1324; 2nd Earl of Pembroke | Marie de St Pol c. 1303 – 1377
Earldom of Pembroke (3rd creation) extinct, 1324
John Hastings; 1286–1325/1326; Baron Hastings | Roger Mortimer; 1287–1330; Earl of March
Earl of Pembroke (4th creation), 1339 | Baron Manny, 1347
Edward III; 1312–1377; King of England | Laurence Hastings; 1319–1348; 1st Earl of Pembroke, Baron Hastings | Agnes Mortimer; 1317–1368 | Edmund Mortimer; 1302/1303–1331 | Katherine Mortimer c. 1314 – 1369 m. Thomas Beauchamp c. 1313 – 1369; Earl of Warwick | Walter Manny d. 1372; 1st Baron Manny
Roger Mortimer; 1328–1360; Earl of March
John of Gaunt; 1340–1399; Duke of Lancaster | Margaret of England; 1346–1361 | John Hastings; 1347–1375; 2nd Earl of Pembroke, Baron Hastings | Anne Manny; 1355–1384; 2nd Baroness Manny, suo jure | Edmund Mortimer; 1352–1381; Earl of March | Philippa de Beauchamp a. 1344 – 1386 m. Hugh Stafford c. 1342 – 1386; Earl of Stafford
Henry IV c. 1367 – 1413 | Elizabeth of Lancaster a. 1363 – 1426 | John Hastings; 1372–1389; 3rd Earl of Pembroke, 3rd Baron Manny, Baron Hastings | Philippa Mortimer; 1375–1440 | Roger Mortimer; 1374–1398; Earl of March, Earl of Ulster | Katherine de Stafford c. 1376 – 1419 m. Michael de la Pole; 1367–1415; Earl of Suffolk
Earldom of Pembroke (4th creation) and barony Manny extinct and baron Hastings dormant, 1389
Earl of Pembroke (5th creation), 1414 | Earl of Pembroke (6th creation), 1447
Catherine of Valois; 1401–1437 | Henry V 1386–1422 | Humphrey of Lancaster; 1390–1447; Duke of Gloucester, Earl of Pembroke | Anne Mortimer; 1388 – c. 1411 | William de la Pole; 1396–1450; Duke of Suffolk, Earl of Pembroke
Earldom of Pembroke (5th creation) reverted to William de la Pole, 1447 | Earldom of Pembroke (6th creation) forfeited, 1450
Earl of Pembroke (7th creation), 1452 | Baron Herbert of Raglan, 1461; Earl of Pembroke (8th creation), 1468
Jasper Tudor c. 1431 – 1495; Duke of Bedford, Earl of Pembroke | Henry VI; 1421–1471 | William Herbert c. 1423 – 1469; 1st Earl of Pembroke, etc. | Richard Woodville; 1405–1469; Earl Rivers | Richard of York; 1411–1460; Duke of York
Earldom of Pembroke (7th creation) forfeit, 1461; restored, 1485; extinct, 1495
Richard Herbert d. 1510 | William Herbert; 1451–1491; 2nd Earl of Pembroke, etc., Earl of Huntingdon | Mary Woodville c. 1456 – 1481 | Elizabeth Woodville c. 1437 – 1492 | Edward IV; 1442–1483
Earldom of Pembroke (8th creation) surrendered in lieu of earldom of Huntingdon, 1479 | For future Barons Herbert, see Duke of Beaufort and Earl of Worcester
Earl of Pembroke (9th creation), 1479
Thomas Parr; 1478–1517 | Elizabeth of York; 1466–1503 m. Henry VII; 1457–1509 | Edward Plantagenet; 1470–1483; Earl of Pembroke, later Edward V
Earldom of Pembroke (9th creation) merged in the crown, 1483
Earl of Pembroke (10th creation) and Baron Herbert of Cardiff, 1551 | Marquess of Pembroke, 1532
Henry Grey; 1517–1554; Duke of Suffolk | William Herbert; 1501–1570; 1st Earl of Pembroke, etc. | Anne Parr; 1515–1552 | Katherine Parr; 1512–1548 | Henry VIII; 1491–1547 | Anne Boleyn c. 1501 or 1507 – 1536
Marquessate of Pembroke either merged in the crown, 1533 or forfeited, 1536
Jane Grey c. 1536/37 – 1554 disputed Queen of England | Katherine Grey; 1540–1568 | Henry Herbert c. 1538 – 1601; 2nd Earl of Pembroke, etc.
Earl of Montgomery and Baron Herbert of Shurland, 1605
Mary Talbot c. 1580–1649 | William Herbert; 1580–1630; 3rd Earl of Pembroke, etc. | Philip Herbert; 1584–1650; 4th Earl of Pembroke, etc., 1st Earl of Montgomery, etc. | Susan de Vere; 1587–1629
Mary Villiers; 1622–1685 | Charles Herbert styled Lord Herbert of Shurland c. 1619 – 1635 | Philip Herbert; 1621–1669; 5th Earl of Pembroke, etc., 2nd Earl of Montgomery, etc. | James Herbert c. 1623 – 1677
William Herbert; 1641–1674; 6th Earl of Pembroke, etc., 3rd Earl of Montgomery, etc. | Philip Herbert; 1652/1653–1683; 7th Earl of Pembroke, etc., 4th Earl of Montgomery, etc. | Thomas Herbert c. 1656 – 1733; 8th Earl of Pembroke, etc., 5th Earl of Montgomery, etc. | James Herbert; 1660–1704
Philip Herbert c. 1689 – 1750; 9th Earl of Pembroke, etc., 6th Earl of Montgomery, etc. | Robert Sawyer Herbert; 1693–1769 | Thomas Herbert c. 1695 – 1739 | William Herbert c. 1696 – 1757 | Nicholas Herbert c. 1706 – 1775
Baron Porchester, 1780; Earl of Carnarvon (3rd creation), 1793
Henry Herbert; 1734–1794; 10th Earl of Pembroke, etc., 7th Earl of Montgomery, etc. m. Elizabeth Spencer; 1737–1831 | Henry Herbert; 1741–1811; 1st Earl of Carnarvon, etc. m. Elizabeth Wyndham; 1752–1826
George Augustus Herbert; 1759–1827; 11th Earl of Pembroke, etc., 8th Earl of Montgomery, etc. m. Yekaterina Semyonovna Vorontsova; 1783–1856 | Henry George Herbert; 1772–1833; 2nd Earl of Carnarvon, etc. m. Kitty Herbert; 1772–1813 | Charles Herbert; 1774–1808 | William Herbert; 1778–1847 | Algernon Herbert; 1792–1855
Baron Herbert of Lea, 1861
Robert Herbert; 1791–1862; 12th Earl of Pembroke, etc., 9th Earl of Montgomery, etc. | Sidney Herbert; 1810–1861; 1st Baron Herbert of Lea m. Mary Elizabeth Ashe à Court-Repington; 1822–1911 | Catherine Herbert; 1814–1886 m. Alexander Edward Murray; 1804–1845; Earl of Dunmore | Henry John George Herbert; 1800–1849; 3rd Earl of Carnarvon, etc.
George Robert Charles Herbert; 1850–1895; 13th Earl of Pembroke, etc., 10th Earl of Montgomery, etc., 2nd Baron Herbert of Lea | Sidney Herbert; 1853–1913; 14th Earl of Pembroke, etc., 110th Earl of Montgomery, etc., 3rd Baron Herbert of Lea | Henry Howard Molyneux Herbert; 1831–1890; 4th Earl of Carnarvon, etc. | Auberon Edward William Molyneux Howard Herbert; 1838–1906
Reginald Herbert; 1880–1960; 15th Earl of Pembroke, etc., 12th Earl of Montgomery, etc., 4th Baron Herbert of Lea | George Edward Stanhope Molyneux Herbert; 1866–1923; 5th Earl of Carnarvon, etc. m. Almina Victoria Maria Alexandra Wombwell; 1876–1969 | Aubrey Nigel Henry Molyneux Herbert; 1880–1923 | Mervyn Robert Howard Molyneux Herbert; 1882–1929
Patricia Caroline Beatrix Herbert; 1904–1994 m. William Henry Smith; 1903–1948; Viscount Hambleden | Sidney Herbert; 1906–1969; 16th Earl of Pembroke, etc., 13th Earl of Montgomery, etc., 5th Baron Herbert of Lea | David Alexander Reginald Herbert; 1908–1995 | Henry George Alfred Marius Victor Francis Herbert; 1898–1987; 6th Earl of Carnarvon, etc. m. Anne Catherine Tredick Wendell; 1900–1977 | Evelyn Leonora Almina Herbert; 1901–1980
Henry George Charles Alexander Herbert; 1939–2003; 17th Earl of Pembroke, etc., 14th Earl of Montgomery, etc., 6th Baron Herbert of Lea | Henry George Reginald Molyneux Herbert; 1924–2001; 7th Earl of Carnarvon, etc. m. Jean Margaret Wallop; 1935–2011
Emma Louise Herbert b. 1969 | William Alexander Sidney Herbert b. 1978; 18th Earl of Pembroke, etc., 15th Earl of Montgomery, etc., 7th Baron Herbert of Lea | George Reginald Oliver Molyneux Herbert b. 1956; 8th Earl of Carnarvon, etc.
Reginald Herbert b. 2014 styled Lord Herbert | George Herbert b. 1992 styled Lord Porchester
Heir apparent to the earldoms of Pembroke and Montgomery | Heir apparent to the earldom of Carnarvon

== Arms ==
Coat of arms of Earl of Carnarvon
| Coronet A coronet of an Earl Crest A Wyvern with wings elevated Vert holding in the mouth a Sinister Hand couped at the wrist Gules Escutcheon Per pale Azure and Gules three Lions rampant Argent, a crescent argent in the chief between the partitions Supporters Dexter: a Panther guardant Argent semée of Torteaux and Hurts flames issuant from the mouth and ears proper; Sinister: a Lion Argent, each ducally gorged per pale Azure and Gules and chained Or and charged on the shoulder with an Ermine Spot Sable Motto UNG JE SERVIRAY ("ONE I WILL SERVE") |

== See also ==
- Herbert family
- Earl of Pembroke
- Baron Lucas of Crudwell
