= Highclere Castle =

Country house in Hampshire, England

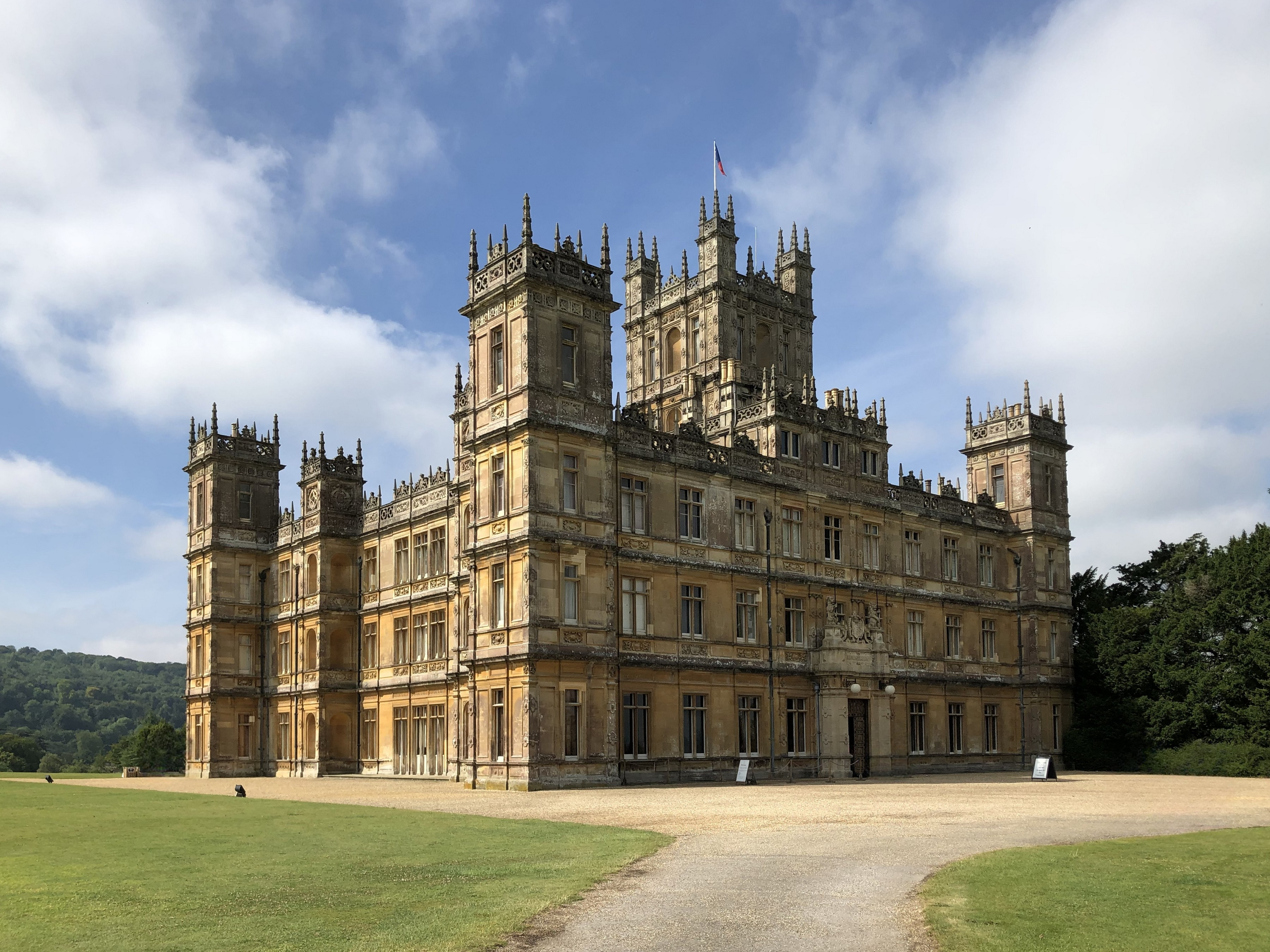
- Highclere in 2019

- Location within Hampshire

General information
- Status: Grade I listed
- Type: Stately home
- Architectural style: Jacobethan and Italianate
- Location: Highclere, Hampshire
- Coordinates: 51.326667°N 1.361389°W
- Year built: 1679
- Renovated: 1842–1849
- Owner: The 8th Earl of Carnarvon

Other information
- Number of rooms: 300

Website
- highclerecastle.co.uk

Highclere Castle /ˈhaɪklɪər/ is a Grade I listed country house built in 1679 and largely renovated during the 1840s, with a park designed by Capability Brown in the 18th century. The 5,000-acre (2,000-hectare) estate is in Highclere, Hampshire, England, about five miles (eight kilometres) south of Newbury, Berkshire, and 9 1/2 miles (15 kilometres) north of Andover, Hampshire. The 19th-century renovation is in a Jacobethan and Italianate style produced by architect Charles Barry. It is the country seat of the Earls of Carnarvon, a branch of the Anglo-Welsh Herbert family.

Highclere Castle has been used as a filming location for several films and television series, including the 1990s comedy series Jeeves and Wooster. It achieved international fame as the main location for the ITV historical drama series Downton Abbey (2010–2015) and the 2019, 2022 and 2025 films based on it.

The house, Egyptian exhibition, and gardens are open to the public for self-guided tours during the summer months and at other times during the rest of the year, such as Christmas and Easter. The house also holds ticketed events, such as the Battle Proms picnic concert, and special guided tours throughout the year.

== History ==
=== Early years ===
The first written records about the estate date from 749, when an Anglo-Saxon king granted the estate to the Bishops of Winchester. The original site was also recorded in the Domesday Book of 1086. In the late 14th century, William of Wykeham, Bishop of Winchester, built a medieval palace (the bishop's residence) and gardens in the park. An itinerary of King Edward II lists him as spending 2 September 1320 with Rigaud of Assier, the Bishop of Winchester, at Bishop's Clere, alias Highclere. The same tour has him on 31 August 1320 at Sandleford Priory, where he apparently stayed for the night; and on 29 and 30 August he was at Crookham, Berkshire. In 1551, during the English Reformation King Edward VI confiscated the property from the Church of England.

=== Robert Sawyer ===
Originally granted by the king to the Fitzwilliam family, Highclere Castle had several owners during the next 125 years.

The palace was rebuilt as Place House in 1679 when it was purchased by Sir Robert Sawyer, the Attorney General to Charles II and James II, who was a lawyer, MP, Speaker, and college friend of Samuel Pepys. In 1692, Sawyer bequeathed the mansion at Highclere to his only daughter, Margaret Sawyer, the first wife of the 8th Earl of Pembroke, Thomas Herbert. Their second son, Robert Sawyer Herbert, inherited Highclere, began its portrait collection, and created the garden temples. His nephew and heir Henry Herbert was created Baron Porchester and later Earl of Carnarvon by George III.

=== Milles and Pococke families ===
In 1680, Sir Robert Sawyer presented the living of Highclere to the Rev Isaac Milles (1638–1720) the elder, who remained there until his death. White Oak was the parsonage where Milles took pupils, including the many children of Thomas Herbert, 8th Earl of Pembroke, who was by marriage the new proprietor of Highclere. The Rev. Isaac Milles the younger (fl. 1701–1727) carried on his father's school at Highclere. Elizabeth, the daughter of Milles the younger, married Rev. Richard Pococke LL.B. (1660–1710) and had the Rt Rev. Richard Pococke (1704–1765), who, having been educated by his grandfather Milles at his school at Highclere rectory, went on to become domestic chaplain to Philip Stanhope, 4th Earl of Chesterfield, and then Bishop of Ossory and Meath, as well as a renowned travel writer and orientalist.

Bishop Pococke was one of the first to collect seeds of the Cedar of Lebanon, which he did during his tour of Lebanon in 1738. Some of these seeds germinated and grew at Highclere and Wilton House, but probably also at nearby Sandleford and his family's own Newtown House, Hampshire.

Coincidentally, the apparently unrelated (and earlier) Rev Edward Pococke (1604–1691), another orientalist, was sometime vicar of Chieveley and then rector of Childrey (both nearby in Berkshire), and was an even earlier importer of the cedar. And of his six sons, the eldest, Edward Pococke (1648–1727) was chaplain to the Earl of Pembroke, and rector of Minall or Mildenhall, Wiltshire (1692), and canon of Salisbury (1675).

=== William Cobbett's description ===
William Cobbett (1763–1835) in his journal of 2 November 1821, while at Hurstbourne Tarrant, wrote:

I came from Berghclere this morning, and through the park of Lord Caernarvon, at Highclere. It is a fine season to look at woods. The oaks are still covered, the beeches in their best dress, the elms yet pretty green, and the beautiful ashes only beginning to turn off. This is, according to my fancy, the prettiest park that I have ever seen. A great variety of hill and dell. A good deal of water, and this, in one part, only wants the colours of American trees to make it look like a creek; for the water runs along at the foot of a steepish hill, thickly covered with trees, and the branches of the lowermost trees hang down into the water and hide the bank completely.

I like this place better than Fonthill, Blenheim, Stowe, or any other gentleman's grounds that I have seen. The house I did not care about, though it appears to be large enough to hold half a village. The trees are very good, and the woods would be handsomer if the larches and firs were burnt, for which only they are fit. The great beauty of the place is the lofty downs, as steep, in some places, as the roof of a house, which form a sort of boundary, in the form of a part of a crescent, to about a third part of the park, and then slope off and get more distant, for about half another third part. A part of these downs is covered with trees, chiefly beech, the colour of which, at this season, forms a most beautiful contrast with that of the down itself, which is so green and so smooth! From the vale in the park, along which we rode, we looked apparently almost perpendicularly up at the downs, where the trees have extended themselves by seed more in some places than others, and thereby formed numerous salient parts of various forms, and, of course, as many and as variously formed glades. These, which are always so beautiful in forests and parks, are peculiarly beautiful in this lofty situation and with verdure so smooth as that of these chalky downs.

Our horses beat up a score or two of hares as we crossed the park; and, though we met with no gothic arches made of Scotch-fir, we saw something a great deal better; namely, about forty cows, the most beautiful that I ever saw, as to colour at least. They appear to be of the Galway-breed. They are called, in this country, Lord Caernarvon's breed. They have no horns, and their colour is a ground of white with black or red spots, these spots being from the size of a plate to that of a crown-piece; and some of them have no small spots. These cattle were lying down together in the space of about an acre of ground: they were in excellent condition, and so fine a sight of the kind I never saw.

=== 19th century ===
The house was then a square, classical mansion but, after an abortive exterior remodelling by Thomas Hopper in Greek Revival style for the second Earl, it was remodelled and largely rebuilt for the third Earl following a design by Sir Charles Barry between 1842 and 1849 during his construction of the Houses of Parliament. It is in the Jacobethan style and faced in Bath stone, reflecting the Victorian revival of English architecture of the late 16th century and early 17th centuries, when Tudor architecture was being challenged by newly arrived Renaissance architecture influences.

During the 19th century, there was a Renaissance Revival movement, of which Sir Charles Barry was an exponent; Barry described the style of Highclere as Anglo-Italian. Barry had been inspired to become an architect by the Renaissance architecture of Italy and was very proficient at working in the Renaissance-based style that became known in the 19th century as Italianate architecture. At Highclere, however, he worked in the Jacobethan style, but added to it some of the motifs of the Italianate style. This is particularly noticeable in the towers, which are slimmer and more refined than those of Mentmore Towers, the other great Jacobethan house built in the same era. Barry produced an alternative design in a more purely Italian Renaissance style, which was rejected by Lord Carnarvon. The external walls are decorated with strapwork designs typical of Northern European Renaissance architecture. The Italian Renaissance theme is more evident in the interiors. In the saloon, in an attempt to resemble a medieval English great hall, Barry's assistant Thomas Allom introduced a Gothic influence evident in the points rather than curves of the arches, and the mock-hammerbeam roof.

Although the exterior of the north, east and south sides were completed before the 3rd Earl died in 1849 and Sir Charles Barry died in 1860, the interior and the west wing (designated as servants' quarters) were far from complete. The 4th Earl turned to the architect Thomas Allom, who had worked with Barry, to supervise work on the interior of the castle, which was completed in 1878. The 1st Earl had his park laid out according to a design by Capability Brown in 1774–1777, moving the village in the process—the remains of the church of 1689 are at the north-west corner of the castle. The Lebanon Cedars are believed to be descended from seeds brought to England from Lebanon by the 17th-century seed collector Edward Pococke.

==== The founding of Canada ====
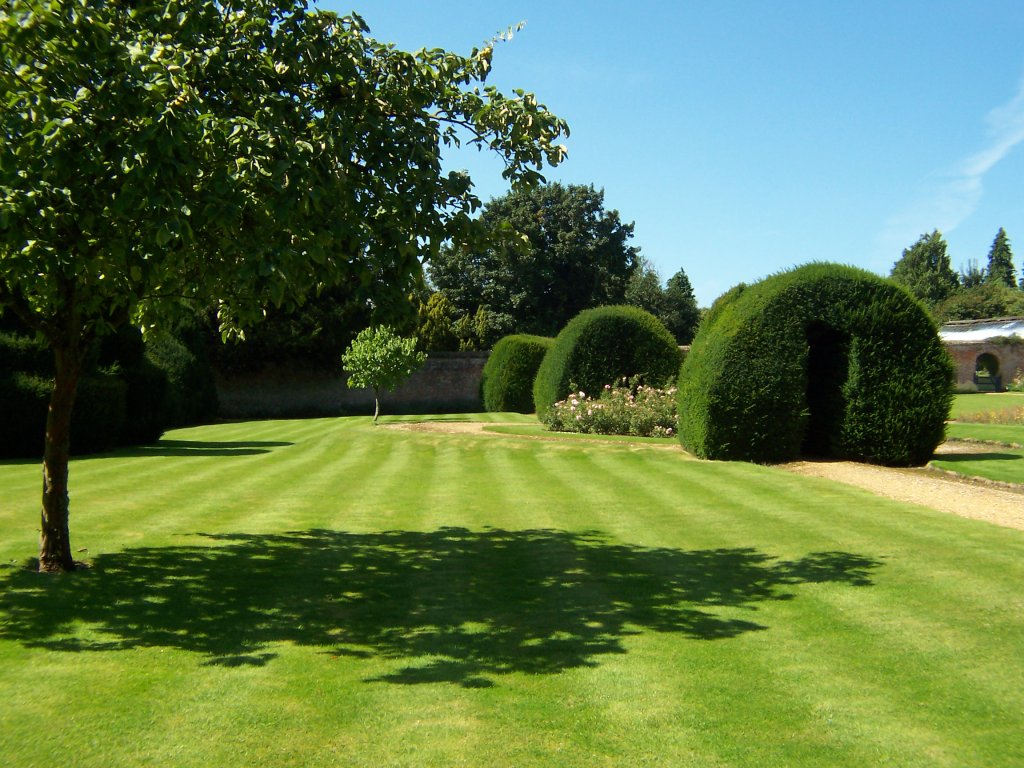
Lawn stripes, topiary

In the 1860s, the 4th Earl drafted the British North America Act 1867 at the castle alongside the first Prime Minister of Canada, John A. Macdonald, George-Étienne Cartier and Alexander Tilloch Galt, who signed the visitor book in 1866. The 4th Earl presented the Act to Parliament in February 1867. The passage of the Act later that year represented the legal expression of Canadian Confederation and the establishment of Canada in its present institutional form; the Act forms the framework of the Constitution of Canada to this day. After the discovery of documents between him and John A. Macdonald, showing eight weeks of nearly daily correspondence, Janice Charette, the Canadian High Commissioner to the United Kingdom, recognised the central role of the 4th Earl in the creation of Canada by planting a maple tree on the lawn on 11 January 2018.

=== 20th century ===
George Herbert, the 5th Earl, married the rich heiress Almina Wombwell, the daughter of the bank heir Alfred de Rothschild (1842–1918), a son of Lionel de Rothschild. Thus Lord Carnarvon received a very large dowry. Rothschild père also made her the heiress to his vast fortune.

At the beginning of World War I, a hospital for war wounded was opened at Highclere Castle, with Lady Carnarvon helping with the organisation and assisting as a nurse.

The castle became home to Egyptian artefacts after the 5th Earl, an enthusiastic amateur Egyptologist, sponsored the excavation of nobles' tombs in Deir el-Bahari (Thebes) in 1907 and employed archaeologist Howard Carter in the search for the tomb of Tutankhamun.

The Egyptian Museum at Highclere Castle was established after the discovery of the tomb of Tutankhamun in 1922. After the death of the 5th Earl in 1923, Lady Carnarvon continued to support Howard Carter and his team. She resided at Highclere but spent much of her time in Egypt supporting the famous excavations. Her legacy is one of the less noted in the history of Egyptology, but her contribution is immeasurable.

During World War II, the castle housed evacuee children. Some Allied aircraft crashed onto the estate; sections of a downed B-17 Flying Fortress are held at the castle.

=== 21st century ===
In September 2001, upon the death of his father, George Reginald Oliver Molyneux Herbert (born 10 November 1956) became the 8th Earl of Carnarvon.

In the 21st century, Lord and Lady Carnarvon undertook significant repairs and restoration work at Highclere. This included major repairs to the roof. In 2007, they created the Egyptian Exhibition, which lies in the cellars of the castle and tells the story of the discovery of Tutankhamun's tomb by the 5th Earl. By 2009, the castle was again in need of about £12 million of major repairs of which £1.8 million was urgently required.

The castle was used as the main filming location for the ITV/PBS drama series Downton Abbey, which brought the castle international fame. The increased numbers of visitors to the castle have allowed for repairs on Highclere's turrets and its interior. The family now live in Highclere Castle at various times throughout the year, but return to their cottage when the castle is open to the public. A Lego set based on the castle's appearance in Downton Abbey is set to be released in October 2026.

In 2024, a medieval barn (c. 1438) on the estate was being restored.

== Highclere Park ==
The parkland surrounding the castle is listed Grade I on the Register of Historic Parks and Gardens and is listed as a Site of Special Scientific Interest (SSSI).

The park is the earliest documented estate in Hampshire, having been given in 749 to the Church of Winchester as a deer park. In 1706, under the ownership of Robert Sawyer Herbert, the park became a rococo landscape of walks. Then in 1770 it became a landscaped park designed by Capability Brown.

In 1991, Highclere Park was registered as an SSSI. The park's listing as an SSSI is due to a mixture of habitats that contain many regionally uncommon plants, and its diverse range of lichen.

== Details ==
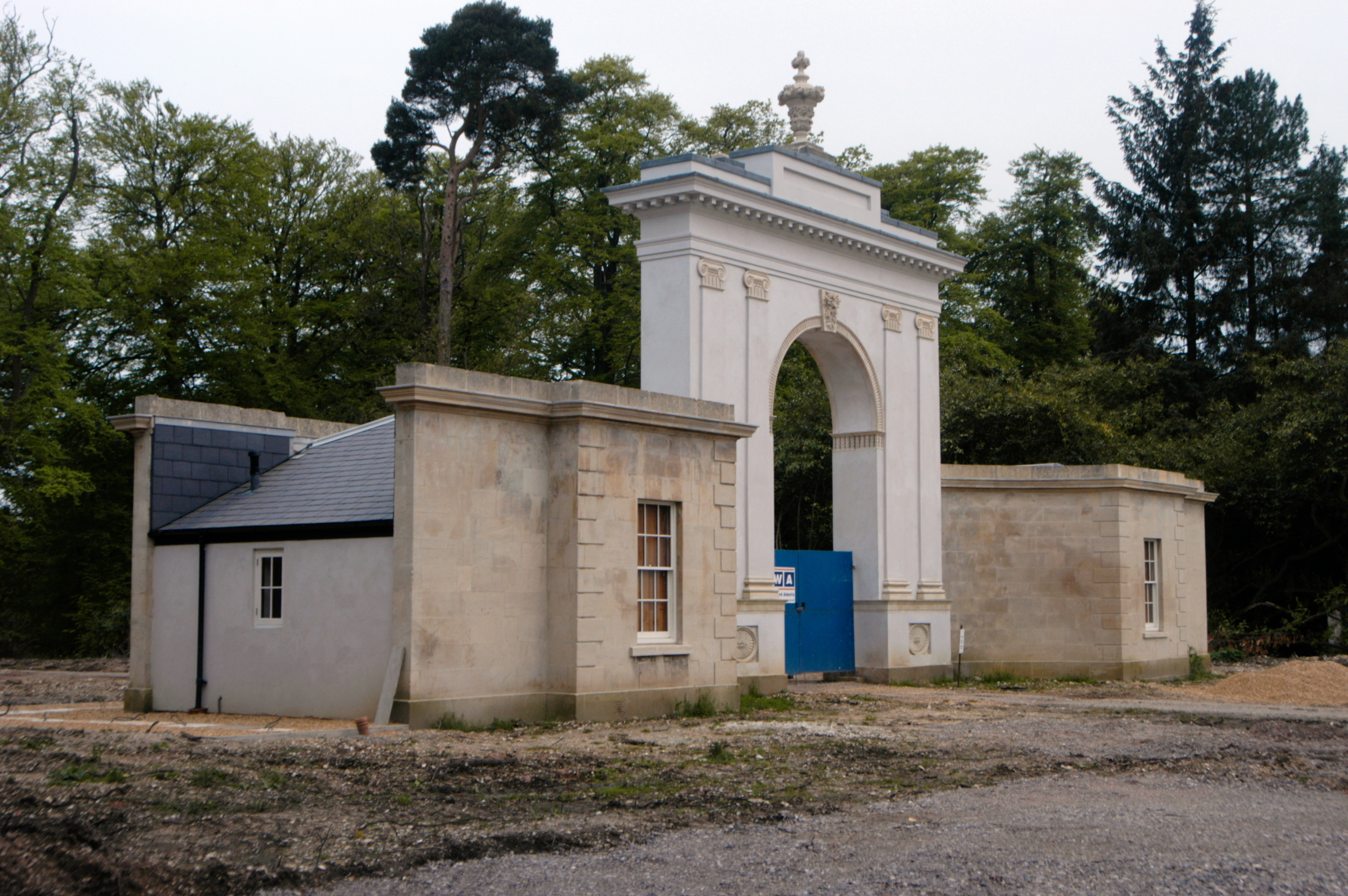
Restored Grade II* listed London Lodge (1793), brick but Coade stone dressed and wings (1840)

There are various follies on the estate. To the east of the house is the Temple of Diana, erected before 1743 with Ionic order columns from Devonshire House in Piccadilly, which had burnt in 1733, and remodelled by Barry. "Heaven's Gate" is a folly about 60 feet high on Sidown Hill, built in 1749 by Hon. Robert Sawyer Herbert (d. 1769). Other 18th-century follies that can be found on the grounds of the estate include Milford Lake House and Jackdaw's Castle, both attributed to the architect earl of Pembroke, brother of the owner, and the Etruscan Temple.

The 2nd Earl of Carnarvon was a passionate horticulturalist and was vice-president of the Royal Horticultural Society from 1829 until his death in 1833. Many hybrids and cultivars of ornamental plants were produced on the castle grounds during that time. The hybrid azalea Rhododendron × altaclerense was first produced on the castle grounds in 1826, with over 25 Highclere azalea cultivars later being produced. The hybrid holly Ilex x altaclerensis (Highclere holly) was developed here in 1835 by hybridising the Madeiran Ilex perado (grown in a greenhouse) with the local native Ilex aquifolium. This hybrid and its offspring are still used as garden plants almost 200 years later.

Highclere Castle launched its own gin brand in 2019 called Highclere Castle Gin. It is the first gin to earn a perfect score, 100 points from the Major League Spirits Association (MLSA).

The castle, Egyptian exhibition, and gardens are open to the public during the summer months and at other times during the rest of the year. The castle also holds special ticketed events throughout the year.

== Gallery ==
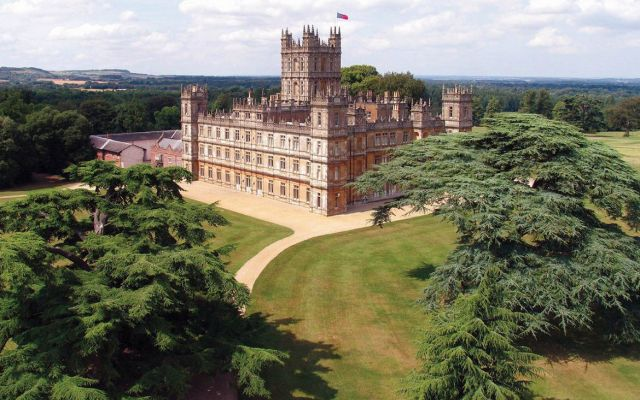
Highclere, view from above

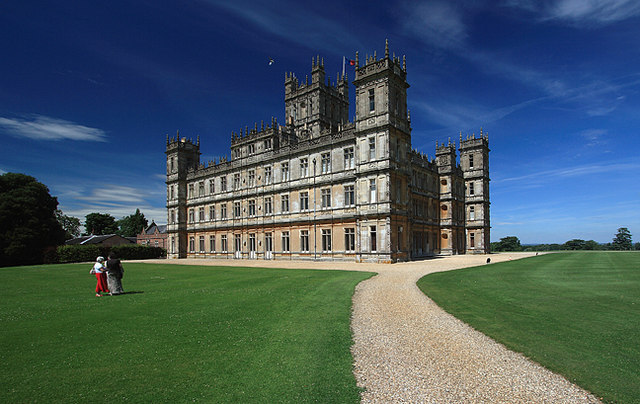
View from the path

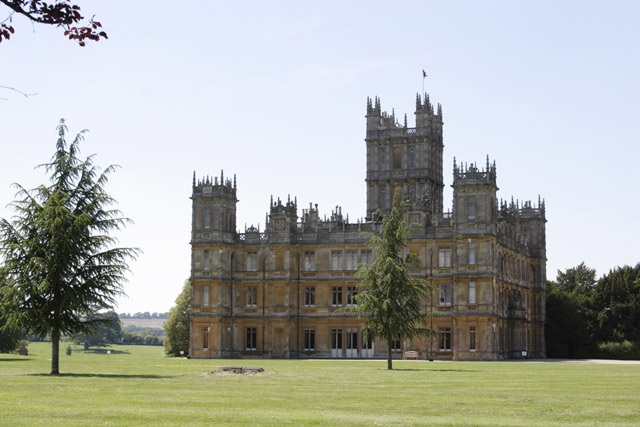
View from the grounds

Highclere Castle on approach

== As a film and television location ==
Year	Title	Episode	Comments
1979	Antiques Roadshow	"Highclere Castle"	BBC series in which antiques experts travel to various regions across the United Kingdom to evaluate and price antiques brought by members of the public.
1982	The Missionary		Handmade Films cinema comedy.
1987	The Secret Garden		TV movie adaptation of the novel by Frances Hodgson Burnett.
1988	A Handful of Dust		New Line Cinema adaptation of the novel by Evelyn Waugh.
1990	Spymaker: The Secret Life of Ian Fleming		TV biographical film of the life of James Bond creator Ian Fleming.
1990–1993	Jeeves and Wooster	"The Silver Jug (or, Jeeves Saves the Cow Creamer)" (1991); "The Bassetts' Fancy Dress Ball (or, A Plan for Gussie)" (1991); "Sir Watkyn Bassett's Memoirs (or, Hot Off the Press)" (1992); "The Ex's Are Nearly Married Off (or, the Ties That Bind)" (1993); "Totleigh Towers (or, Trouble at Totleigh Towers)" (1993)	Adaptation of the stories by P. G. Wodehouse. Highclere Castle represented Totleigh Towers, home of Sir Watkyn Basset and his daughter Madeline.
1991	King Ralph		Mirage Enterprises cinema production.
1991	Robin Hood: Prince of Thieves		
1991	Duel of Hearts		Gainsborough Pictures TV adaptation of the Barbara Cartland novel.
1992	A Sense of History		TV comedy drama.
1999	Eyes Wide Shut		Warner Brothers cinema production. Interiors at Highclere were used for the masked ball scene, which portrayed about 20 people having sex.
2001	Back to the Secret Garden		Sequel to The Secret Garden. Highclere Castle was used for exterior shots of Misselthwaite Manor.
2002	The Four Feathers		Miramax cinema adaptation of the novel by A. E. W. Mason.
2004	Agatha Christie's Marple	"4.50 from Paddington"	ITV adaptation of the Agatha Christie novel.
2006	Stately Suppers	"Highclere Castle"	BBC2 series in which presenter Alistair Appleton and chef James Martin visit stately homes to cook dinner and explore the locality.
2010–2015	Downton Abbey	52 episodes	ITV historical drama written and co-produced by Julian Fellowes. The great hall, dining room, library, music room, drawing room, salon and several of the bedrooms were used for filming, as well as the exteriors and grounds.
2010	Maid in Britain		TV documentary about television drama productions inspired by the British class divide. Also featuring George Herbert, 8th Earl of Carnarvon, and Fiona Herbert, 8th Countess of Carnarvon.
2011	This Morning	Episode dated 26 October 2011	ITV talk show presented by Eamonn Holmes and Ruth Langsford.
2012	Secrets of the Manor House	"Secrets of Highclere Castle"	Yesterday Channel production featuring stately homes across the UK. Presented by Samuel West, Elisabeth Kehoe and Geoffrey Dymond.
2017	Mary Berry's Country House Secrets	Episode 1 – "Highclere Castle"	TV documentary series themed around food in British manor houses. Presented by Mary Berry.
2019	Tutankhamun with Dan Snow	Episode 1	TV archaeological documentary series, in three parts, about the life story of the Egyptian boy king Tutankhamun, whose tomb was uncovered in 1922 by an expedition financed by the 5th Earl of Carnavon.
2019	Downton Abbey (film)		Perfect World Pictures, Focus Features and Carnival Films cinema production.
2021	Infinite		Paramount Pictures, New Republic Pictures, Di Bonaventura Pictures, Closest to the Hole Productions and Leverage Entertainment
2022	Downton Abbey: A New Era		Focus Features and Universal Pictures cinema production.
2025	Downton Abbey: The Grand Finale		Focus Features and Carnival Films cinema production

== As event venue ==
In 2007, the grounds were the venue for the Countryside Rocks concert, to raise funds for the UK rural advocacy organisation Countryside Alliance, featuring Bryan Ferry, Steve Winwood, Eric Clapton, Steve Harley and Kenney Jones. As of March 2023, the castle will no longer be used to host large weddings due to staffing shortages.

== See also ==
- Canadian Confederation
- Other Downton Abbey filming locations:
  - Bampton, Oxfordshire
  - Byfleet Manor
  - Inveraray Castle
  - Waddesdon Manor
