= Custos Rotulorum of Glamorgan =

This is a list of people who have served as Custos Rotulorum of Glamorgan.

- William Herbert, 1st Earl of Pembroke 1543–1570
- Henry Herbert, 2nd Earl of Pembroke 1570–1601
- Sir John Herbert 1601–1603
- William Herbert, 3rd Earl of Pembroke 1603–1630
- Philip Herbert, 4th Earl of Pembroke 1630–1645
- Sir John Aubrey, 1st Baronet 1645–1646
- Interregnum
- Philip Herbert, 5th Earl of Pembroke 1660–1669
- William Herbert, 6th Earl of Pembroke 1670–1674
- Philip Herbert, 7th Earl of Pembroke 1674–1683
- Thomas Herbert, 8th Earl of Pembroke 1683–1728
- Charles Paulet, 3rd Duke of Bolton 1728–1754

For later custodes rotulorum, see Lord Lieutenant of Glamorgan.
