= Thomas Herbert, 8th Earl of Pembroke =

British statesman (1656–1733)

The Right Honourable The Earl of Pembroke KG PC FRS
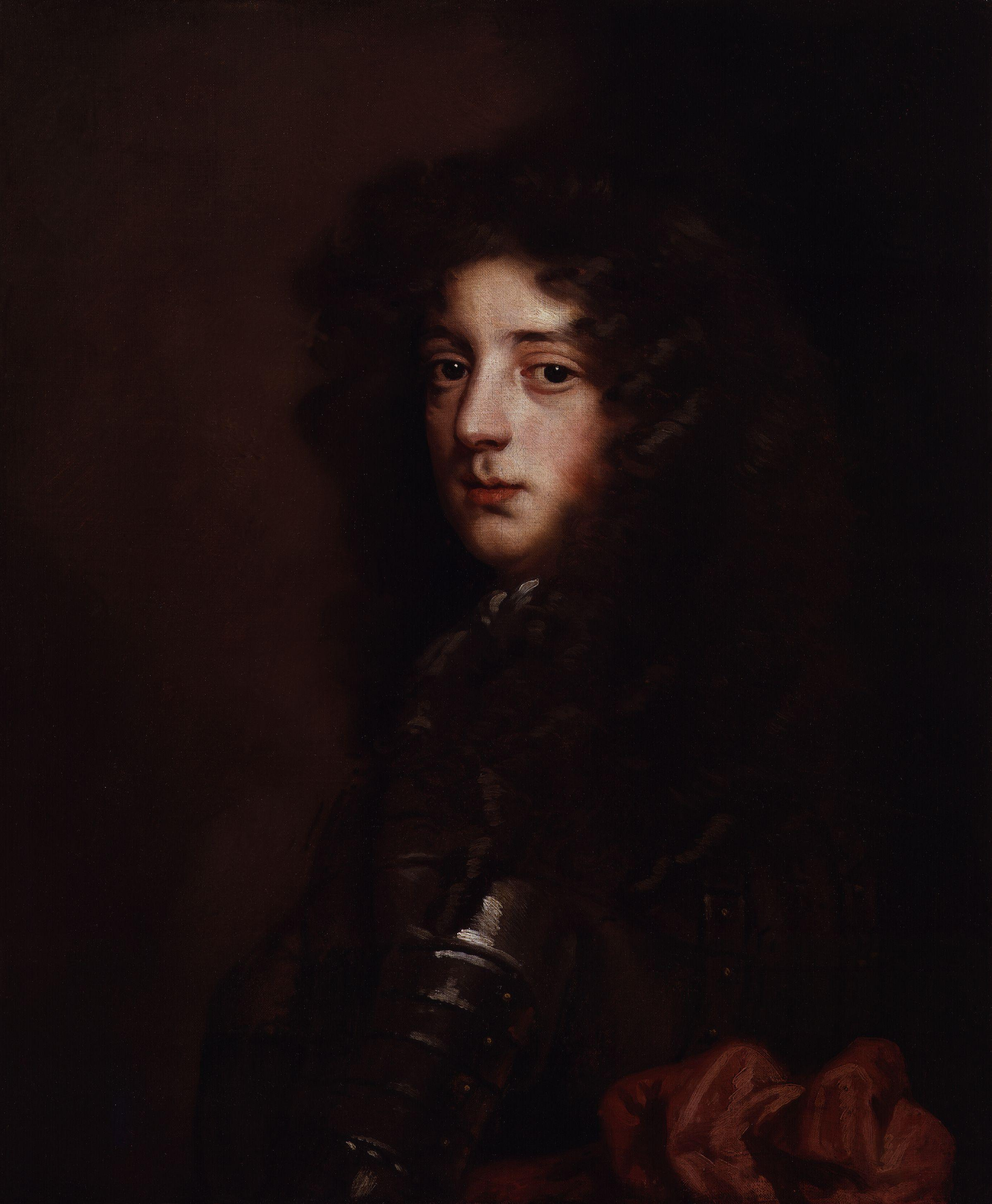
- Portrait by John Greenhill, c. 1676

8th President of the Royal Society
- In office 1689–1690
- Preceded by: John Vaughan
- Succeeded by: Robert Southwell

First Lord of the Admiralty
- In office 1690–1692
- Monarchs: William III and Mary II
- Preceded by: The Earl of Torrington
- Succeeded by: The Lord Cornwallis

Lord Privy Seal
- In office 1692–1699
- Preceded by: In Commission; Last held by Lord Halifax
- Succeeded by: The Viscount Lonsdale

Lord President of the Council
- In office 18 May 1699 – 29 January 1702
- Monarch: William III
- Preceded by: The Duke of Leeds
- Succeeded by: The Duke of Somerset
- In office 9 July 1702 – 25 November 1708
- Monarch: Anne
- Preceded by: The Duke of Somerset
- Succeeded by: The Lord Somers

Personal details
- Born: 1656
- Died: 22 January 1733 (aged 76–77)
- Spouses: Margaret Sawyer (m. 1684); Barbara Slingsby (m. 1708; died 1721); Mary Howe
- Children: 13, including Henry, Robert, Thomas, William, and Nicholas
- Parents: Philip Herbert, 5th Earl of Pembroke; Catharine Villiers

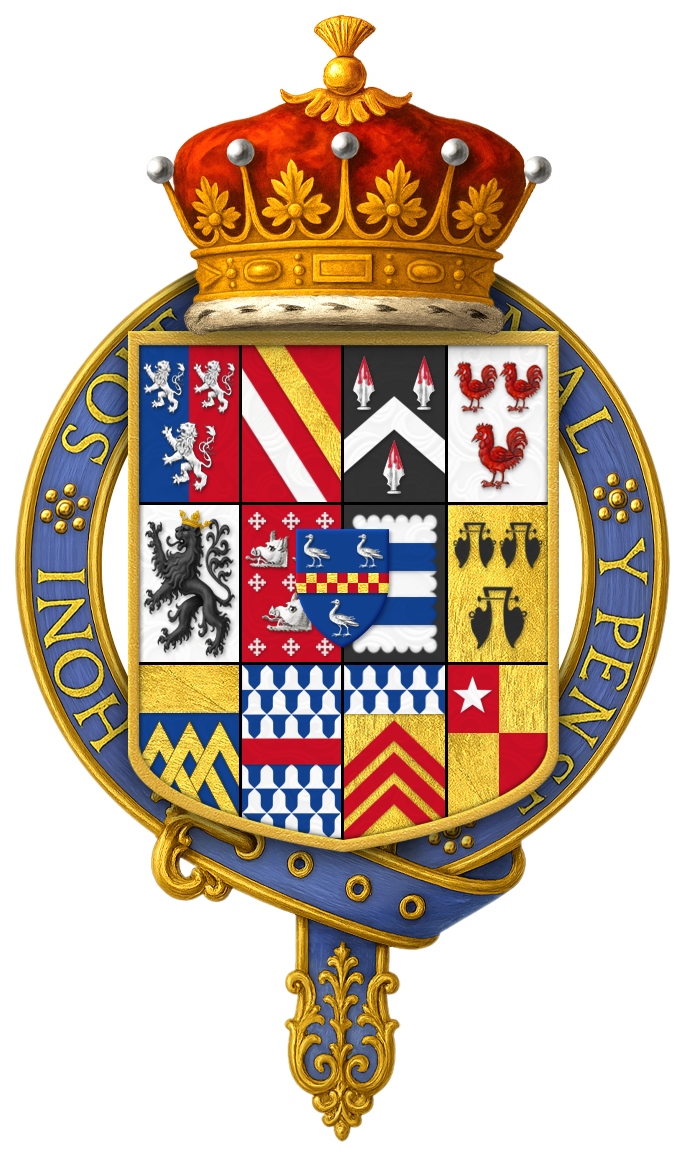
Quartered arms of Thomas Herbert, 8th Earl of Pembroke, 5th Earl of Montgomery

Thomas Herbert, 8th Earl of Pembroke (c. 1656 – 22 January 1733), styled The Honourable Thomas Herbert until 1683, was a British statesman who served as Lord Privy Seal from 1692 to 1699.

== Background ==
Herbert was the third son of Philip Herbert, 5th Earl of Pembroke and his wife Catharine Villiers, daughter of Sir William Villiers, 1st Baronet who was the half-brother of the 1st Duke of Buckingham, George Villiers. Through his grandmother, Susan de Vere, he was a great-grandson of Edward de Vere, 17th Earl of Oxford, the Oxfordians' William Shakespeare. He was educated at Tonbridge School, Kent. Both of his brothers (the 6th Earl and the 7th Earl) having died without a male heir, he succeeded to the earldoms in 1683. Through them, he would inherit the family seat of the Earls of Pembroke, Wilton House in Wiltshire. He met John Locke in Montpellier, France in the late 1670s; as earl, Herbert became an influential friend and patron of the philosopher.

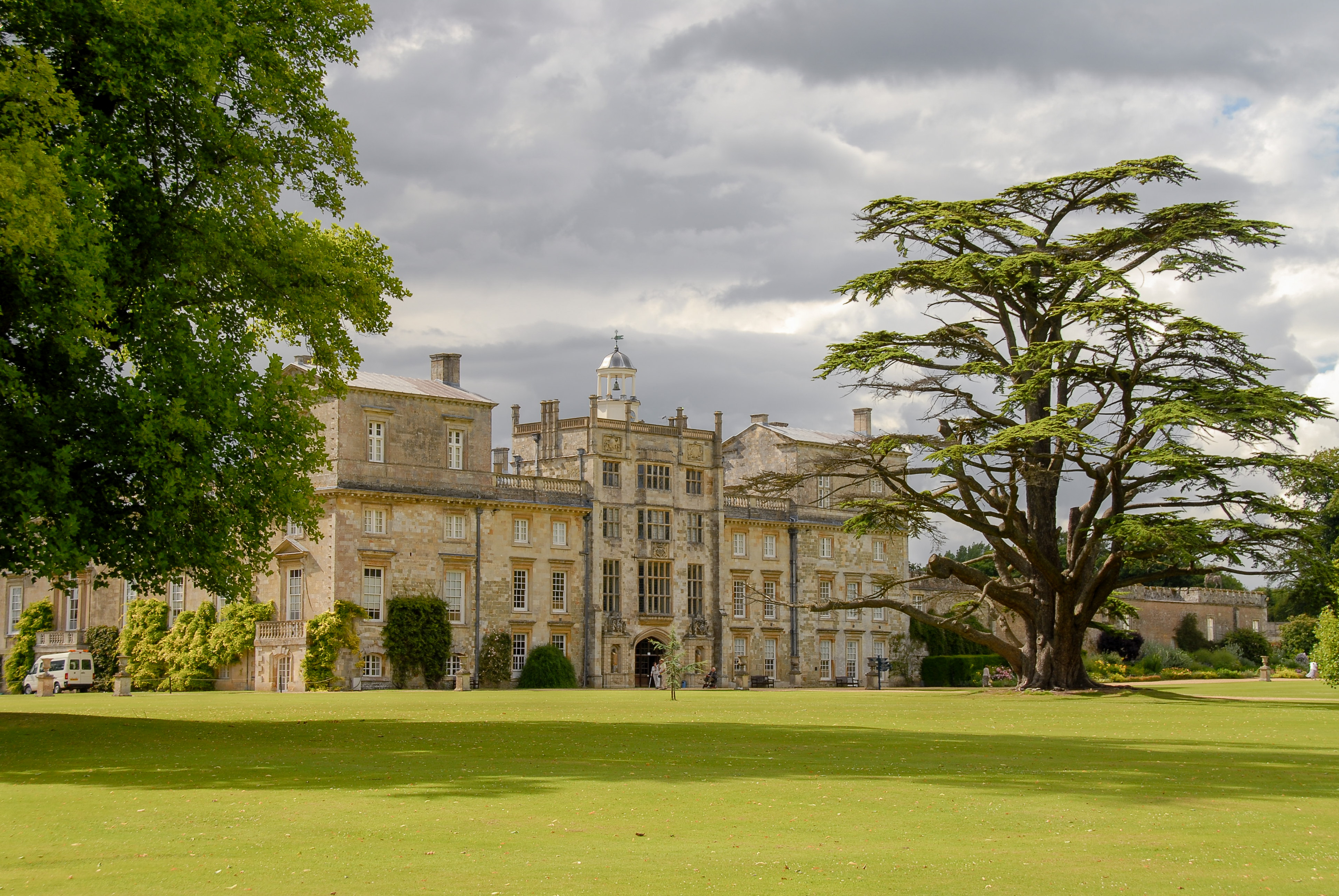
Wilton House, Family seat of the Earls of Pembroke

== Public life ==
Herbert was returned unopposed as Member of Parliament for Wilton at the two general elections of 1679 and the general election of 1681. He was no longer able to sit in the House of Commons after assuming the peerage in 1683.

As Lord Lieutenant of Wiltshire, Pembroke commanded the Wiltshire Militia against the Monmouth Rebellion in 1685. They mustered at Salisbury on 17 June and marched to Bath. Hearing that Frome had declared for the Duke of Monmouth, Pembroke marched out with a squadron of Militia Horse carrying some musketeers behind their saddles. On arrival he found a large number of rebel recruits, some armed with pistols or pikes, others with scythes and clubs. Despite being heavily outnumbered, Pembroke entered the town at the head of his musketeers, followed by the horse. A shot was fired at him, but the rebels soon broke and ran before the advancing militia, who then captured the bridge after some fighting. Afterwards Pembroke with his Wiltshire Militia and some Hampshire Militia blocked Monmouth's advance into Wiltshire. The Wiltshire Militia then accompanied the Royal army to Bridgwater in pursuit of the rebels. When Monmouth attempted a night attack on the Royal army camped on Sedgemoor, Pembroke quickly rode from his quarters at Weston Court in Westonzoyland and roused his men; they formed the reserve during the Battle of Sedgemoor. Afterwards they took part in the pursuit and clearing-up operations.

From 1690 to 1692 as Lord Pembroke, he was First Lord of the Admiralty. He then served as Lord Privy Seal until 1699, being in 1697 the first plenipotentiary of Great Britain at the congress of Ryswick. On two occasions he was Lord High Admiral for a short period making him the most recent non-royal holder of the position; he was also Lord President of the Council and Lord Lieutenant of Ireland, while he acted as one of the Lords Justices seven times; and he was President of the Royal Society in 1689–1690. He is the dedicatee of John Locke's An Essay Concerning Human Understanding, Thomas Greenhill's The Art of Embalming and George Berkeley's A Treatise Concerning the Principles of Human Knowledge.

== Marriages and progeny ==
He married three times:

- Firstly in 1684 to Margaret Sawyer, only daughter of Sir Robert Sawyer of Highclere Castle by his wife Margaret Suckeley, by whom he had seven sons and five daughters:
  - Henry Herbert, 9th Earl of Pembroke (c. 1689–1750), eldest son and heir
  - Hon. Robert Sawyer Herbert (died 1769), who inherited Highclere Castle
  - Hon. Charles Herbert
  - Hon. Thomas Herbert (c. 1695–1739)
  - Maj-Gen. Hon. William Herbert (c. 1696 – 31 March 1757), married Catherine Elizabeth Tewes (died 28 August 1770) and had Henry Herbert, 1st Earl of Carnarvon, who inherited Highclere Castle from his uncle
  - Hon. John Herbert
  - Hon. Nicholas Herbert (c. 1706–1775), husband of Anne North, daughter of Dudley North and Katherine Yale
  - Lady Catherine Herbert (died September 1716), wife of Sir Nicholas Morice, 2nd Baronet
  - Lady Margaret Herbert (died 15 December 1752)
  - Lady Elizabeth Herbert
  - Lady Anne Herbert
  - Lady Rebecca Herbert, wife of William Nevill, 16th Baron Bergavenny
- Secondly in 1708 he married Barbara Slingsby (died 1 August 1721), daughter of Sir Thomas Slingsby, 2nd Baronet and widow of John Arundell, 2nd Baron Arundell of Trerice (1649–1698), of Trerice, Cornwall, by whom he had one daughter:
  - Lady Barbara Herbert (died 27 December 1752), who on 3 October 1730 married William Dudley North, son of Dudley North.
- Thirdly he married Mary Howe (died 1749), daughter of Scrope Howe, 1st Viscount Howe; they had no children. She subsequently married John Mordaunt, MP.

== See also ==
- List of presidents of the Royal Society

== Bibliography ==
- David Chandler, Sedgemoor 1685: An Account and an Anthology, London: Anthony Mott, 1985, ISN 0-907746-43-8.
- Doyle, James William Edmund (1886). The Official Baronage of England: showing the succession, dignities, and offices of every peer from 1066 to 1885, Vol. III. London: Longmans, Green & Co.
- Collins, Arthur (1812). Peerage of England. F. C. and J. Rivington. pp. 142–143.
- Christopher L. Scott, The military effectiveness of the West Country Militia at the time of the Monmouth Rebellion, Cranfield University PhD thesis 2011.

Parliament of England
Preceded by Thomas Mompesson; John Berkenhead	Member of Parliament for Wilton; 1679–1683; With: Thomas Penruddocke 1679; Sir John Nicholas 1679–1683	Succeeded by Sir John Nicholas; Oliver Nicholas
Political offices
Preceded by The Earl of Torrington	First Lord of the Admiralty; 1690–1692	Succeeded by The Lord Cornwallis
Preceded by In Commission	Lord Privy Seal; 1692–1699	Succeeded by The Viscount Lonsdale
Preceded by The Duke of Leeds	Lord President of the Council; 1699–1702	Succeeded by The Duke of Somerset
Preceded by The Earl of Bridgewater (First Lord of the Admiralty)	Lord High Admiral; 1701–1702	Succeeded by Prince George of Denmark
Preceded by The Duke of Somerset	Lord President of the Council; 1702–1708	Succeeded by The Lord Somers
Preceded by The Duke of Ormonde	Lord Lieutenant of Ireland; 1707–1708	Succeeded by The Earl of Wharton
Preceded by Queen Anne	Lord High Admiral; 1708–1709	Succeeded by The Earl of Orford (First Lord of the Admiralty)
Military offices
New regiment	Colonel of the 2nd Maritime Regiment; 1690–1691	Succeeded by Henry Killigrew
Honorary titles
Preceded by The Earl of Pembroke	Lord Lieutenant of Wiltshire jointly with The Earl of Yarmouth 1688–1689; 1683–1733	Succeeded by The Earl of Pembroke
Preceded by The Earl of Pembroke	Custos Rotulorum of Glamorgan; 1683–1728	Succeeded by The Duke of Bolton
Preceded by The Earl of Pembroke	Custos Rotulorum of Pembrokeshire; 1683–1715	Succeeded by Sir Arthur Owen, Bt
Preceded by The Earl of Macclesfield	Lord Lieutenant of Pembrokeshire; 1694–1715	Succeeded by Sir Arthur Owen, Bt
Preceded by The Earl of Macclesfield	Lord Lieutenant of Brecknockshire and Monmouthshire; 1694–1715	Succeeded by John Morgan
Preceded by The Earl of Macclesfield	Lord Lieutenant of Cardiganshire; 1694–1715	Succeeded by The Viscount Lisburne
Preceded by The Earl of Macclesfield	Lord Lieutenant of Carmarthenshire; 1694–1715	Vacant Title next held by George Rice
Preceded by The Earl of Macclesfield	Lord Lieutenant of Glamorgan; 1694–1715	Vacant Title next held by The Duke of Bolton
Preceded by The Earl of Macclesfield	Lord Lieutenant of Radnorshire; 1694–1715	Succeeded by The Lord Coningsby
Peerage of England
Preceded by Philip Herbert	Earl of Pembroke; Earl of Montgomery; 1683–1733	Succeeded by Henry Herbert
Professional and academic associations
Preceded by John Vaughan	8th President of the Royal Society; 1689–1690	Succeeded by Robert Southwell
