= Custos Rotulorum of Pembrokeshire =

This is a list of people who have served as Custos Rotulorum of Pembrokeshire.

- John Vaughan bef. 1544 – bef. 1558
- Thomas Cathern bef. 1558 – bef. 1562
- Sir John Perrot bef. 1562–1592
- Robert Devereux, 2nd Earl of Essex bef. 1594–1601
- Sir James Perrot 1601 – aft. 1608
- Sir William Wogan bef. 1621–1625
- William Herbert, 3rd Earl of Pembroke 1625–1630
- Philip Herbert, 4th Earl of Pembroke 1630–1643
- Richard Vaughan, 2nd Earl of Carbery 1643–1646
- Interregnum
- Philip Herbert, 5th Earl of Pembroke 1660–1669
- William Herbert, 6th Earl of Pembroke 1670–1674
- Philip Herbert, 7th Earl of Pembroke 1674–1683
- Thomas Herbert, 8th Earl of Pembroke 1683–1715
- Sir Arthur Owen, 3rd Baronet 1715–1753

For later custodes rotulorum, see Lord Lieutenant of Pembrokeshire.
