= Custos Rotulorum of Wiltshire =

Civi post holder in Wiltshire, England

This is a list of people who have served as Custos Rotulorum of Wiltshire.

- Sir Richard Lyster bef. 1544–1553
- Sir John Thynne bef. 1558–1580
- Henry Herbert, 2nd Earl of Pembroke bef. 1584–1601
- Edward Seymour, 1st Earl of Hertford 1601–1621
- Sir Francis Seymour 1621 – bef. 1626
- William Seymour, 2nd Duke of Somerset bef. 1626–1646, 1660
- Philip Herbert, 4th Earl of Pembroke 1650
- Francis Seymour, 1st Baron Seymour of Trowbridge 1660–1664
- Charles Seymour, 2nd Baron Seymour of Trowbridge 1664–1665
- William Herbert, 6th Earl of Pembroke 1665–1674
- John Seymour, 4th Duke of Somerset 1674–1675
- Philip Herbert, 7th Earl of Pembroke 1675–1683
- Thomas Thynne, 1st Viscount Weymouth 1683–1688
- William Paston, 2nd Earl of Yarmouth 1688–1690
- Thomas Thynne, 1st Viscount Weymouth 1690–1706
- Evelyn Pierrepont, 1st Marquess of Dorchester 1706–1711
- Thomas Thynne, 1st Viscount Weymouth 1711–1714
- Evelyn Pierrepont, 1st Duke of Kingston 1714–1726
- Algernon Seymour, 7th Duke of Somerset 1726–1750
- Robert Sawyer Herbert 1750–1752

For later custodes rotulorum, see Lord Lieutenant of Wiltshire.
