= John Seymour, 4th Duke of Somerset =

English peer and MP

His Grace The Duke of Somerset
- John Seymour, 4th Duke of Somerset

Duke of Somerset
- Tenure: 1671–1675
- Predecessor: William Seymour
- Successor: Francis Seymour
- Born: John Seymour born 1646
- Died: 29 April 1675
- Spouse: Sarah Alston (m. 1656)
- Father: William Seymour
- Mother: Frances Devereux

John Seymour, 4th Duke of Somerset and 3rd Marquess of Hertford (before 1646 – 29 April 1675) was an English peer and MP.

== Life ==
Restoration of Marquis of Hertford Act 1660
- Act of Parliament
- Parliament of England
- Long title: An Act for the restoring of the Marquis of Hertford to the Dukedom of Somersett.
- Citation: 12 Cha. 2. c. 10 Pr.
- Territorial extent: England and Wales

Dates
- Royal assent: 13 September 1660
- Commencement: 25 April 1660 (Note: Start of session.)

Status: Current legislation

He was a younger son of William Seymour, 2nd Duke of Somerset, and Lady Frances Devereux. He was the only one of the second duke's sons still alive when his father died and the title descended to his six-year-old nephew, William.

In 1661 he married Sarah, daughter and co-heiress of Sir Edward Alston and widow of George Grimston in exchange for a dowry of £10,000. Her father negotiated an independent income of £300 per year for his daughter and additional clauses to cover the possibility that she became a widow. The marriage was a financial success but otherwise it was a disaster. John liked drinking and gambling, but Sarah did not.

He was elected Member of Parliament for Marlborough in 1661. Although the voters of Marlborough usually accepted the Seymour family's nominee, on this occasion the seat was contested and he received only one more vote than his rival. Unhappy in his marriage and having fallen out with his nephew's guardian and his mother, he entered Gray's Inn in 1666 in order to escape his creditors. He succeeded his nephew as the 4th Duke of Somerset in 1671, but much of the family estate was inherited by his niece Elizabeth, who subsequently married Thomas Bruce, 2nd Earl of Ailesbury.

He spent the last two separated from his wife after she petitioned the King concerning his behaviour. He died in 1675, childless and was buried in Salisbury Cathedral. He was succeeded in the dukedom by his cousin, Francis Seymour. The Marquessate of Hertford became extinct on his death.

== Notes ==
Honorary titles
Preceded by The Duke of Ormonde	Lord Lieutenant of Somerset; 1672–1675	Succeeded by The Earl of Winchilsea
Preceded by The Marquess of Worcester	Custos Rotulorum of Somerset; 1672–1675	Succeeded by The Viscount Fitzhardinge
Preceded by The Earl of Essex	Lord Lieutenant of Wiltshire; 1672–1675	Succeeded by The 7th Earl of Pembroke
Preceded by The 6th Earl of Pembroke	Custos Rotulorum of Wiltshire; 1674–1675	Succeeded by The 7th Earl of Pembroke
Peerage of England
Preceded by William Seymour	Duke of Somerset; 1671–1675	Succeeded by Francis Seymour
Preceded by William Seymour	Marquess of Hertford; 1671–1675	Extinct
