= Lord Lieutenant of Wiltshire =

Civil post in Wiltshire, England

This is a list of people who have served as Lord Lieutenant of the English county of Wiltshire. From 1750, all Lord Lieutenants have also been Custos Rotulorum of Wiltshire.

== Lord Lieutenants of Wiltshire ==
- William Herbert, 1st Earl of Pembroke 1551 – 17 March 1570
- Henry Herbert, 2nd Earl of Pembroke 1570 – 15 January 1601
- Edward Seymour, 1st Earl of Hertford 24 April 1601 – 6 April 1621
- William Herbert, 3rd Earl of Pembroke 14 April 1621 – 10 April 1630
- Philip Herbert, 4th Earl of Pembroke 12 August 1630 – 1642
- Interregnum
- William Seymour, 1st Marquess of Hertford 10 July 1660 – 24 October 1660
- Thomas Wriothesley, 4th Earl of Southampton 21 February 1661 – 16 May 1667
- Edward Hyde, 1st Earl of Clarendon 18 June 1667 – 2 April 1668
- Arthur Capell, 1st Earl of Essex 2 April 1668 – 22 August 1672
- John Seymour, 4th Duke of Somerset 22 August 1672 – 29 April 1675
- Philip Herbert, 7th Earl of Pembroke 20 May 1675 – 29 August 1683
- Thomas Herbert, 8th Earl of Pembroke 11 October 1683 – 22 January 1733 jointly with
- William Paston, 2nd Earl of Yarmouth 22 March 1688 – 16 May 1689
- Henry Herbert, 9th Earl of Pembroke 24 August 1733 – 9 January 1750
- Robert Sawyer Herbert 20 March 1750 – 3 April 1756
- Henry Herbert, 10th Earl of Pembroke 3 April 1756 – 22 March 1780
- Thomas Brudenell-Bruce, 1st Earl of Ailesbury 22 March 1780 – 8 April 1782
- Henry Herbert, 10th Earl of Pembroke 8 April 1782 – 26 January 1794
- George Herbert, 11th Earl of Pembroke 21 March 1794 – 26 October 1827
- Henry Petty-Fitzmaurice, 3rd Marquess of Lansdowne 23 November 1827 – 31 January 1863
- George Brudenell-Bruce, 2nd Marquess of Ailesbury 25 March 1863 – 6 January 1878
- Jacob Pleydell-Bouverie, 4th Earl of Radnor 18 March 1878 – 11 March 1889
- John Thynne, 4th Marquess of Bath 1 April 1889 – 20 April 1896
- Henry Petty-Fitzmaurice, 5th Marquess of Lansdowne 1 June 1896 – 3 March 1920
- Walter Long, 1st Viscount Long 3 March 1920 – 26 September 1924
- Jacob Pleydell-Bouverie, 6th Earl of Radnor 22 December 1924 – 26 June 1930
- Sir Ernest Wills, 3rd Baronet 7 October 1930 – 4 May 1942
- Evelyn Seymour, 17th Duke of Somerset 4 May 1942 – 26 April 1954
- Sidney Herbert, 16th Earl of Pembroke 7 September 1954 – 16 March 1969
- John Morrison, 1st Baron Margadale 26 August 1969 – 17 December 1981
- Sir Hugh Trefusis Brassey 17 December 1981 – 15 December 1989
- Field Marshal Sir Roland Gibbs 15 December 1989 – 5 July 1996
- Lt-General Sir Maurice Johnston 5 July 1996 – 10 November 2004
- John Barnard Bush 10 November 2004 – February 2012
- Dame Sarah Troughton February 2012 – present

== Vice Lord Lieutenants of Wiltshire ==
- George Sidney Herbert, 1915–1942
- Colonel Hugh Trefusis Brassey, 1969–1981
- Field Marshal Sir Roland Gibbs, 1982–1990
- Major-General John Myles (Robin) Brockbank, 1990–1996
- John Richard Arundell, 10th Baron Talbot of Malahide, 2004–2006
- Lieutenant Colonel James Rixon Arkell, 2006–2012
- Charles Petty-FitzMaurice, 9th Marquess of Lansdowne, 2012–2016
- Lieutenant-General Sir Roderick Alexander Cordy-Simpson, 2016–2019
- William Francis Wyldbore-Smith, 2019–2023
- Lieutenant General Sir Andrew Gregory, 2023 to present

== See also ==
- List of deputy lieutenants of Wiltshire
- High Sheriff of Wiltshire

== Bibliography ==
- J.C. Sainty (1970). "Lieutenancies of Counties, 1585–1642". Bulletin of the Institute of Historical Research (Special Supplement No. 8): 36–37.
- J.C. Sainty (1979). List of Lieutenants of Counties of England and Wales 1660–1974. London: Swift Printers (Sales) Ltd.
- Leigh Rayment's Peerage Pages
