= William Lower (astronomer) =

English astronomer (1570–1615)

Sir William Lower (1570 – 12 April 1615) was an English astronomer from the early telescopic period, and a Member of Parliament.

He was born in Cornwall, and after studying at Exeter College, Oxford, he married and settled in South-west Wales. In 1607, he observed Halley's Comet and took a number of careful measurements which he communicated to Thomas Harriot, by which it was determined that the comet was following a curved course. Lower suggested that the comet's orbit obeyed Kepler's laws (instead of being an atmospheric phenomenon or following a rectilinear path, as was generally thought at the time).

Using a telescope that had been provided by Harriot, Lower made a number of observations of the moon, and noted that its surface appeared irregular and "like a tart that my cooke made me last weeke". Similar observations were published by Galileo a few weeks later.

Lower represented Bodmin in the 1601 parliament, and Lostwithiel from 1604 to 1611. He was knighted in 1603.

Lower married Penelope Perrot, the daughter of Sir Thomas Perrot and Dorothy Devereux, by whom he had three sons and a daughter. After Lower's death Penelope (née Perrot) married secondly Sir Robert Naunton, by whom she had a daughter Penelope, who married Philip Herbert, 5th Earl of Pembroke.
