= Robert Naunton =

English writer and politician (1563–1635)

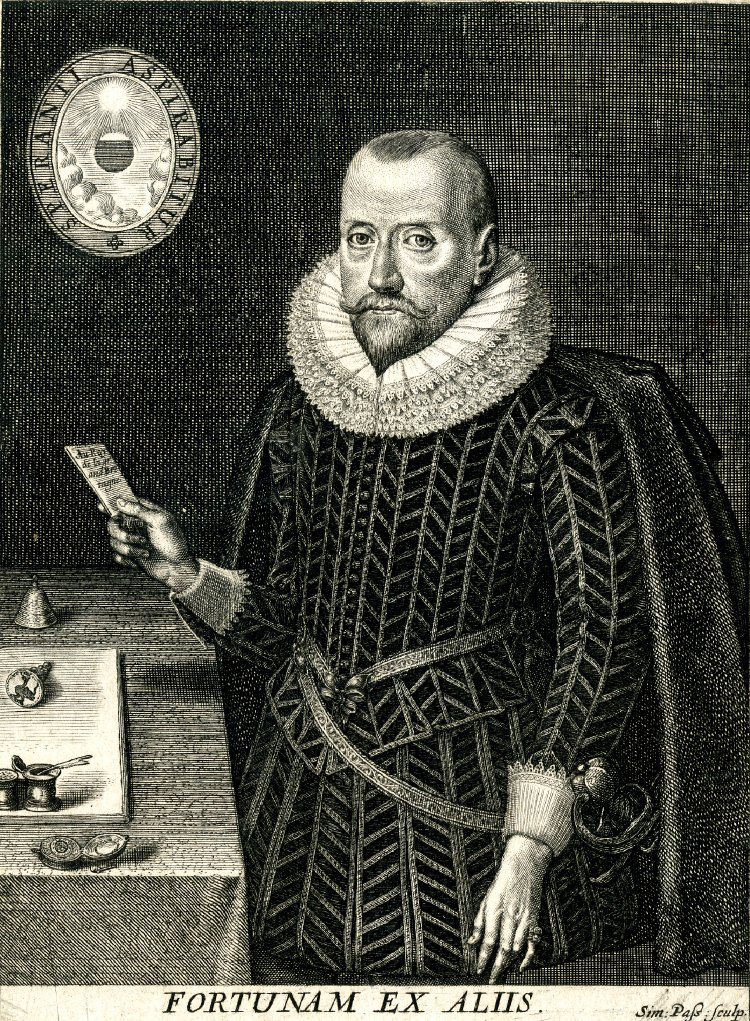
Robert Naunton. Engraving by Simon de Passe

Sir Robert Naunton (1563 – 27 March 1635) was an English writer and politician who sat in the House of Commons at various times between 1606 and 1626.

== Family ==
Robert Naunton was the son of Henry Naunton of Alderton, Suffolk, and Elizabeth Asheby of Hornsby, Leicestershire. According to Schreiber, the Nauntons were "established members of the county gentry and had been so for well over two centuries". Robert Naunton's grandfather, William Naunton, was trained as a lawyer and married Elizabeth Wingfield, the daughter Sir Anthony Wingfield, a trusted servant of Henry VIII. William Naunton was a Member of Parliament, and one of the principal officers of the King's brother-in-law, Charles Brandon, 1st Duke of Suffolk, and later of his widow, Katherine Willoughby, Duchess of Suffolk. Robert Naunton's father, Henry, served as Master of Horse to the Dowager Duchess, while his maternal uncle, William Ashby, was a member of the diplomatic service under Queen Elizabeth.

== Career ==
He was educated at Norwich School and Trinity College, Cambridge, becoming a fellow of his college in 1585 and public orator of the university in 1594. Robert Devereux, 2nd Earl of Essex, commissioned him to spend some time abroad, sending information about European affairs. On his return, Naunton was elected Member of Parliament for Helston at a by-election in 1606. Naunton visited the court in London in October 1605. He thought that Anne of Denmark's farthingale might conceal a pregnancy, writing, "The Queen is generally held to be pregnant, but no appearance eminent by reason of the short vardugals in use".

On 7 September 1615, Naunton was knighted. In 1616, he became Master of Requests and later surveyor of the court of wards. In December 1617 his friend George Villiers, 1st Duke of Buckingham procured for him the position of Secretary of State on the condition of his making Christopher Villiers, Buckingham's brother, his heir, and during his lifetime Villiers gained from Naunton estates worth £500 a year. In 1621 Naunton was elected MP for Cambridge University.

His strong Protestant opinions led him to favour more active intervention by England in the interests of Frederick V, Elector Palatine, and more vigorous application of the laws against Roman Catholics. Naunton was censured after the Spanish ambassador, Gondomar, complained to King James I. Consequently, in January 1623, Naunton resigned as Secretary of State and was made master of the Court of Wards and Liveries.

Sir Robert was re-elected MP for Cambridge University in 1624 and 1625. He was elected MP for Suffolk in 1626. Naunton died at Letheringham, Suffolk at the age of 71.

== Marriages and issue ==
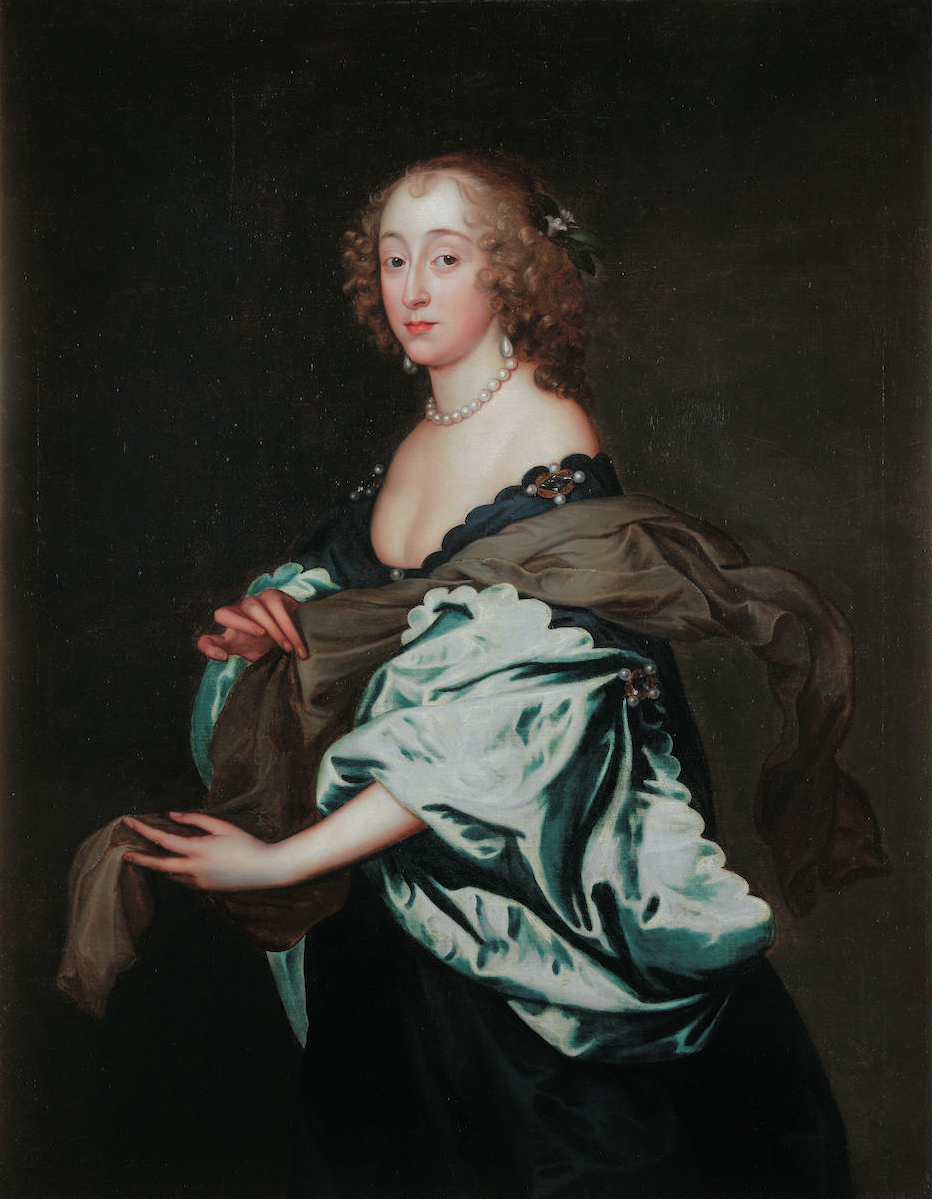
Penelope Naunton (circle of Anthony van Dyck)

Naunton married secondly Penelope Perrot, widow of the astronomer Sir William Lower, and daughter of Sir Thomas Perrot and Dorothy Devereux, daughter of Walter Devereux, 1st Earl of Essex.

Naunton's daughter Penelope married firstly Paul Bayning, 2nd Viscount Bayning (son of Paul Bayning, 1st Viscount Bayning), and secondly Philip Herbert, 5th Earl of Pembroke in his first marriage, by whom he became the grandfather of William Herbert, 6th Earl of Pembroke.

== Works ==
Naunton's account of Queen Elizabeth's reign was still in manuscript when he died. As Fragmenta regalia, written by Sir Robert Naunton, it was printed in 1641 and again in 1642, a revised edition Fragmenta Regalia, or Observations on the late Queen Elizabeth, her Times and Favourites, being issued in 1653. It was again published in 1824, and an edition edited by Edward Arber was brought out in 1870. It has also been printed in several collections and has been translated into French and Italian. There are several manuscript copies extant, and some of Naunton's letters are in the British Museum and in other collections. A modern critical edition was prepared by J. S. Cerovski and published in 1985.

He is the source for Elizabeth's rebuke to Robert Dudley, 1st Earl of Leicester: "by God there shall be one mistress here and no master". He is also noted for his judgement of Henry VIII "He never spared a man in his anger or a woman in his lust". He was largely responsible for the claim that Sir John Perrot, his wife's grandfather, was Henry VIII's natural son.

== Notes ==
Parliament of England
Preceded by Sir John Leigh; John Bogans	Member of Parliament for Helston; 1606–1611; With: Sir John Leigh	Succeeded by Sir Robert Killigrew; Henry Bulstrode
Preceded by Sir Miles Sandys; Sir Francis Bacon	Member of Parliament for Cambridge University; 1621–1625; With: Barnaby Gough 1621–1624; Sir Albert Morton 1625	Succeeded by Thomas Eden; Sir John Coke
Preceded by Sir Edmund Bacon; Thomas Cornwallis	Member of Parliament for Suffolk; 1626; With: Sir Robert Crane	Succeeded by Sir William Spring; Sir Nathaniel Barnardiston
Political offices
Preceded by Sir Ralph Winwood; Sir Thomas Lake	Secretary of State; 1618–1623; With: Sir Thomas Lake 1618–1619; Sir George Calvert 1619–1623	Succeeded by Sir George Calvert; Sir Edward Conway
Preceded by Sir John Coke	Lord Privy Seal; 1628	Succeeded by The Earl of Manchester
