= William Seymour, 2nd Duke of Somerset =

English nobleman (1588–1660)

His Grace The Duke of Somerset KG KB
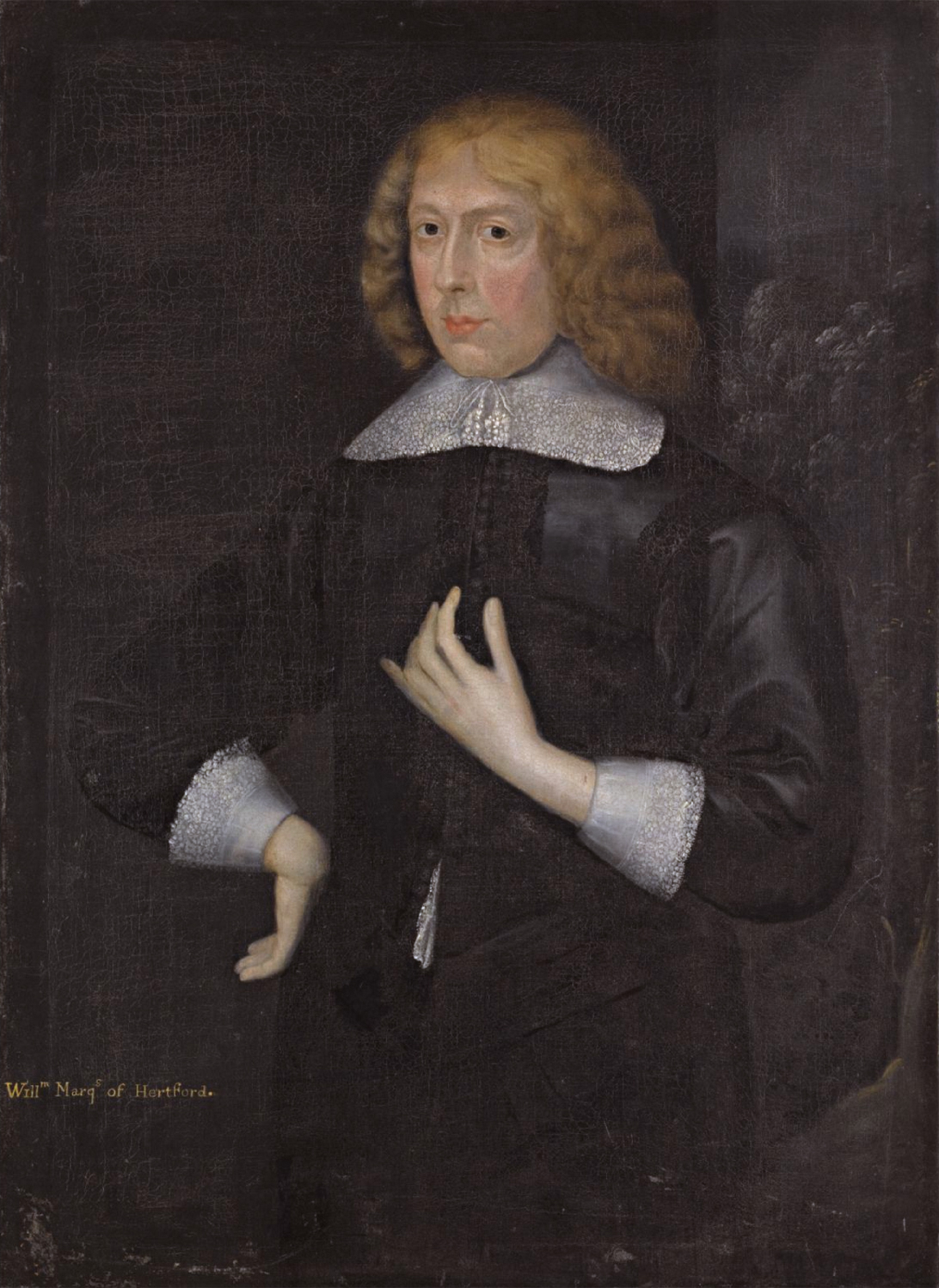
- William Seymour, Marquess of Hertford, later 2nd Duke of Somerset (1588–1660), portrait attributed to Gilbert Jackson (c. 1595/1600–1648), private collection

Duke of Somerset
- Tenure: 1660
- Predecessor: Vacant; Last held by Edward Seymour, 1st Duke of Somerset
- Successor: William Seymour, 3rd Duke of Somerset
- Born: 1588
- Died: 24 October 1660 (aged 71–72)
- Noble family: Seymour
- Spouses: Lady Arbella Stuart; Lady Frances Devereux
- Issue: Frances Darcy, Countess of Holderness; William Seymour; Robert Seymour; Henry Seymour, Lord Beauchamp; Lady Mary Seymour, Countess of Winchilsea; Lady Jane Seymour, Viscountess Dungarvan; John Seymour, 4th Duke of Somerset
- Father: Edward Seymour, Lord Beauchamp
- Mother: Honora Rogers

Arms of Seymour: Gules, two wings conjoined in lure or

William Seymour, 2nd Duke of Somerset, KG, KB (1588 – 24 October 1660) was an English nobleman and Royalist commander in the English Civil War.

== Origins ==
Seymour was the son of Edward Seymour, Lord Beauchamp (who predeceased his own father) by his wife Honora Rogers. He was the grandson of Edward Seymour, 1st Earl of Hertford, by his wife Lady Katherine Grey, a sister of Lady Jane Grey, "The Nine Days Queen", which thus gave him a distant claim to the throne through Katherine's descent from Mary Tudor, younger sister of King Henry VIII. He was the great-grandson of Edward Seymour, 1st Duke of Somerset (c. 1500–1552), the uncle of King Edward VI and Lord Protector of England.

== Life ==
Seymour made a secret marriage at Greenwich on 22 June 1610 to Arbella Stuart (died 1615), daughter of Charles Stuart, 1st Earl of Lennox and his wife, Elizabeth Cavendish. Arbella was thirteen years his senior, and King James I disapproved of the marriage as the union of two potential Tudor pretenders to the throne, who were respectively fourth and sixth in line, could only be seen as a threat to the ruling dynasty. As a result, William was condemned to life imprisonment in the Tower of London and thus became the fourth of five generations of Seymours to spend time in that prison.

In June 1611 Seymour escaped from the Tower, planning to meet up with Arbella, who also had escaped captivity. They were to flee to the Continent, but bad weather and other circumstances prevented their meeting, and Arbella was recaptured and placed back in the Tower. William managed to reach safety abroad at Ostend, and made his way to Luxembourg. He was never reunited with Arbella who remained in the Tower until her death in 1615.

== Political career ==
Seymour was knighted as a Knight of the Bath in November 1616. In December 1620 Seymour was elected Member of Parliament for Marlborough in Wiltshire, but vacated the seat soon afterwards on his elevation to the House of Lords, having succeeded his grandfather as Earl of Hertford in 1621. In the House of Lords he became a prominent opponent to King Charles I, where he supported the Petition of Right of 1628, and co-signed the letter of the twelve Peers of 1640, along with his brother-in-law Robert Devereux, 3rd Earl of Essex.

During the Long Parliament, Seymour eventually parted company with the more radical opponents of the king, and in 1641 was created by him Marquess of Hertford. In the Civil War, Hertford was a moderate royalist, along with such figures as Sir Edward Hyde, and throughout sought a compromise settlement, by continuing unofficial negotiations throughout the war with his brother-in-law Essex, the Parliamentary commander. He was nevertheless a trusted supporter of the king, who made him guardian of his son the future King Charles II, and he undertook several important military commands in royalist service over the course of the war, including commanding troops from South Wales and a successful campaign in Somerset in summer 1643. Along with his brother Lord Seymour, Hertford was sent as a commissioner for the king at the failed Treaty of Uxbridge negotiations (1645).

After the end of the First Civil War and the king's imprisonment, Hertford was the most prominent nobleman to remain alongside the king throughout his captivity, and was with him until his execution in 1649. He was one of four lords (the others being the Duke of Richmond, and the earls of Lindsey and Southampton) who petitioned the Commons to be allowed to assume responsibility for the king's actions and to suffer death in his place. During the interregnum, Hertford kept himself away from both politics and royalist conspiracies, in the belief that the monarchy would eventually be restored and that conspiracies would only delay that event.

Marquis of Hertford's Restoration Act 1661
- Act of Parliament
- Parliament of England
- Long title: An Act for confirming of an Act for restoring of the Marquis of Hertford to the Dukedom of Somersett.
- Citation: 13 Cha. 2. St. 2. c. 1 Pr.
- Territorial extent: England and Wales

Dates
- Royal assent: 20 December 1661

Status: Current legislation

When the restoration of the monarchy came in 1660, Hertford was restored to all his former positions, and his services in the Royalist cause were further recognised by King Charles II, who in 1660 restored Hertford to his great-grandfather's Dukedom of Somerset, which had been forfeited in 1552, via the Marquis of Hertford's Restoration Act 1661 (13 Cha. 2. St. 2. c. 1 Pr.). He thus became the 2nd Duke of Somerset.

== Marriages and children ==
William Seymour married twice:

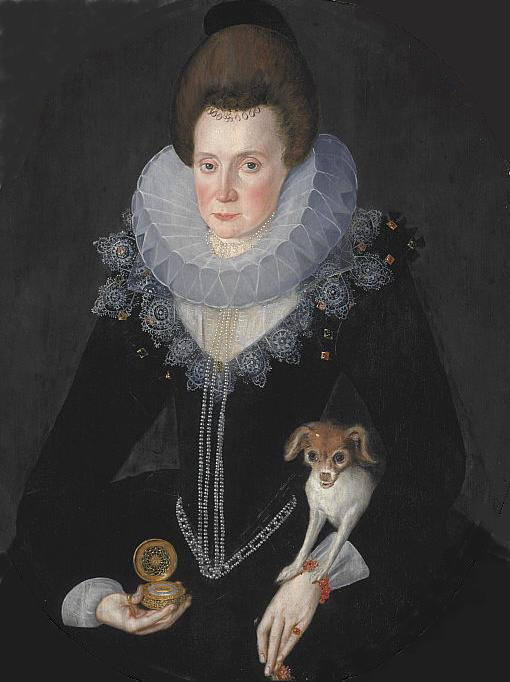
Lady Arbella Stuart (d.1615), Seymour's first wife

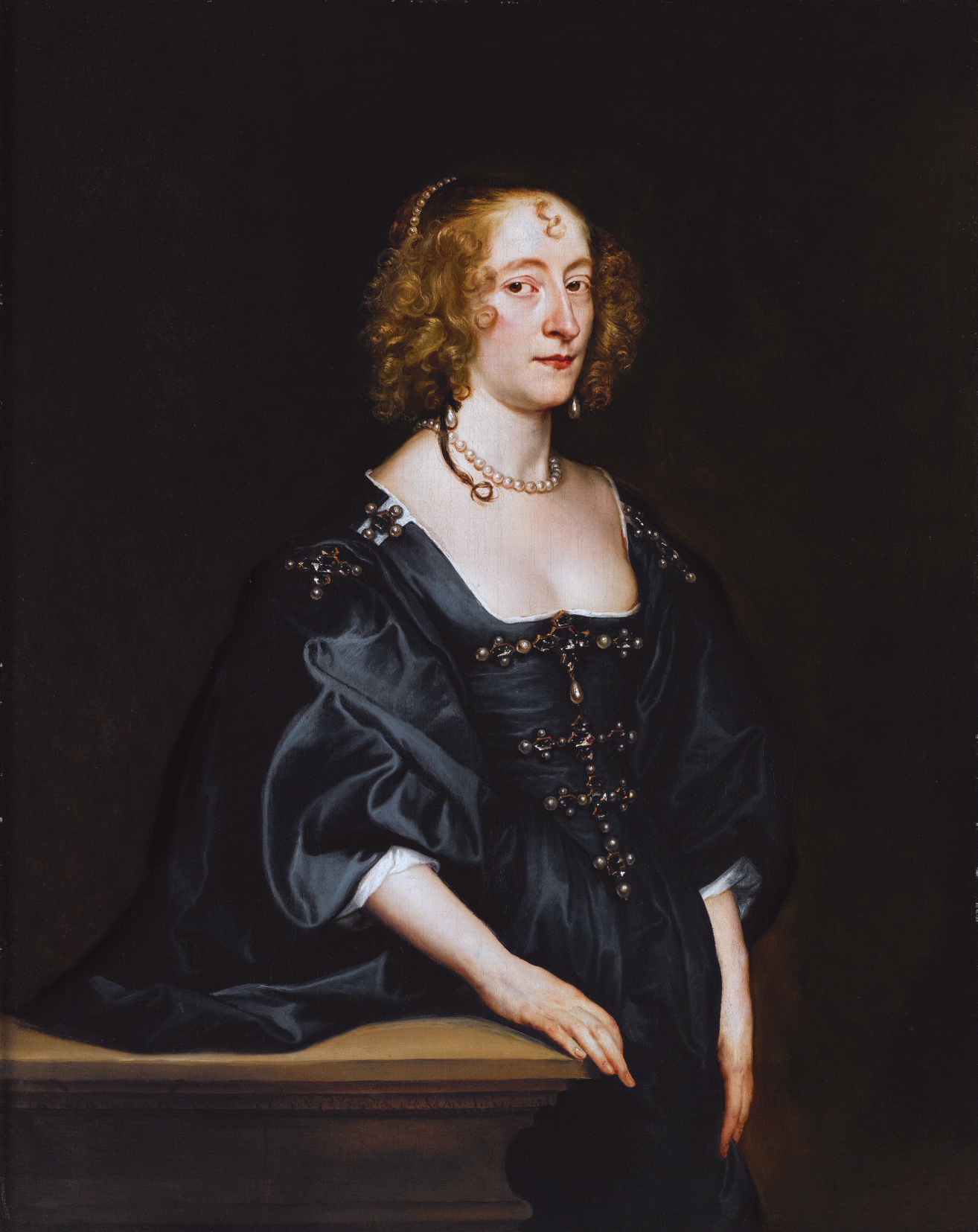
Frances Devereux, by Anthony van Dyck

Firstly and secretly (see above), on 22 June 1610, to his third cousin once-removed Lady Arbella Stuart (died 1615), who was then fourth in line to the succession of their cousin, King James I. There were no children from the marriage.

Secondly, on 3 March 1617 at Drayton Bassett, he married Lady Frances Devereux (1599–1674), daughter of Robert Devereux, 2nd Earl of Essex, by his wife Frances Walsingham, daughter of Francis Walsingham. By Frances he had at least eight children:

=== Issue ===
1. Lady Frances Seymour (1618–1685), who married three times: Firstly to Richard Molyneux, 2nd Viscount Molyneux Secondly (as his third wife) to Thomas Wriothesley, 4th Earl of Southampton, and thirdly (as his third wife) to Conyers Darcy, 2nd Earl of Holderness, by whom she had no children.
2. William Seymour (1621 – 16 June 1642), who predeceased his father.
3. Robert Seymour (1622–1646), who predeceased his father.
4. Henry Seymour, Lord Beauchamp (1626 – 30 March 1654), who married Mary Somerset, Duchess of Beaufort (1630–1715) and had children, including William Seymour, 3rd Duke of Somerset (1654–1671), heir to his grandfather the 2nd Duke. His descendants included Diana, Princess of Wales.
5. Lady Mary Seymour (1637 – 10 April 1673), who married Heneage Finch, 3rd Earl of Winchilsea and had issue.
6. Lady Jane Seymour (1637 – 23 November 1679), who married Charles Boyle, 3rd Viscount Dungarvan and had issue. Her modern descendants included Elizabeth Bowes-Lyon.
7. John Seymour, 4th Duke of Somerset (1646 – 29 April 1675), heir to his nephew in the dukedom in 1671, who married Sarah Alston in 1656 but left no children.

== Death, burial & succession ==
Hertford died at Essex House in London and was buried on 1 November 1660 at Great Bedwyn in Wiltshire. He was succeeded by his grandson William Seymour, 3rd Duke of Somerset.

Parliament of England
Preceded by Richard Digges; Sir Francis Popham	Member of Parliament for Marlborough; 1621; With: Richard Digges	Succeeded by Walter Devereux; Richard Digges
Political offices
Preceded by The Earl of Pembroke	Lord Lieutenant of Somerset jointly with The Earl of Pembroke 1639–1640; Lord Herbert 1640–1646; 1639–1646	English Interregnum
Preceded by Sir Francis Seymour	Custos Rotulorum of Wiltshire; 1626–1646	English Interregnum
Honorary titles
English Interregnum	Lord Lieutenant of Somerset; 1660	Succeeded by The Marquess of Ormonde
English Interregnum	Custos Rotulorum of Somerset; 1660	Succeeded by Sir Charles Berkeley
English Interregnum	Lord Lieutenant of Wiltshire; 1660	Succeeded by The Earl of Southampton
English Interregnum	Custos Rotulorum of Wiltshire; 1660	Succeeded by The Lord Seymour of Trowbridge
Academic offices
Preceded by Earl of Pembroke	Chancellor of the University of Oxford; 1643–1648	Succeeded by Earl of Pembroke
Preceded by Richard Cromwell	Chancellor of the University of Oxford; 1660	Succeeded by Earl of Clarendon
Peerage of England
Vacant forfeit in 1552 Title last held by Edward Seymour	Duke of Somerset; 1660	Succeeded by William Seymour
New creation	Marquess of Hertford; 1640–1660	Succeeded by William Seymour
Preceded by Edward Seymour	Earl of Hertford; 1621–1660	Succeeded by William Seymour
Preceded by Edward Seymour	Baron Beauchamp (writ in acceleration); 1621–1660	Succeeded by William Seymour
