= Philip Herbert, 5th Earl of Pembroke =

English nobleman (1621–1669)

The Right Honourable The Earl of Pembroke
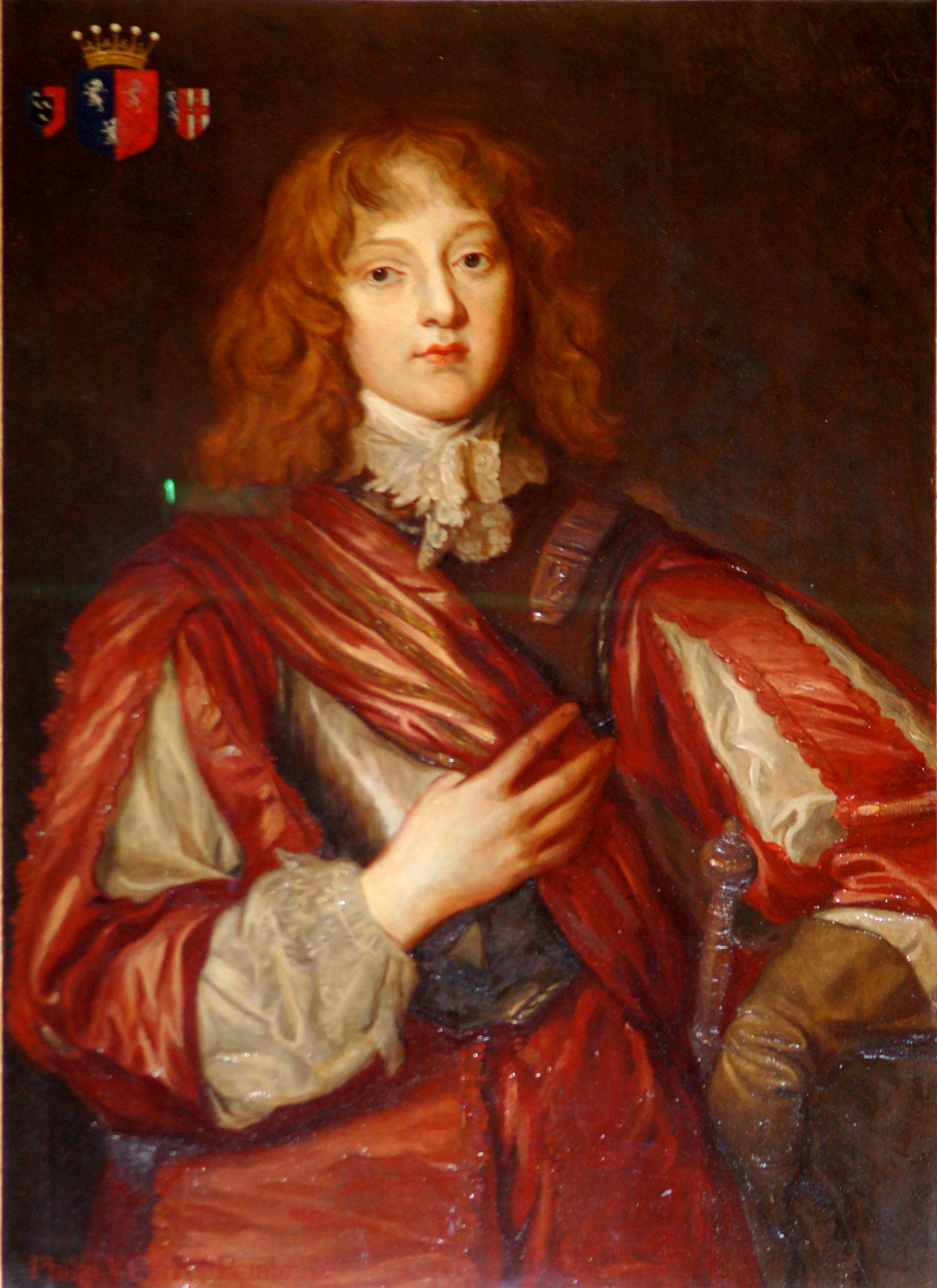
- Philip Herbert, 5th Earl of Pembroke
- Born: 1621
- Died: 11 December 1669 (aged 47–48)
- Title: 5th Earl of Pembroke
- Spouses: Penelope Naunton; Catherine Villiers
- Children: 4 (including William, 6th Earl, Philip, 7th Earl, and Thomas, 8th Earl)
- Parent(s): Philip Herbert, 4th Earl of Pembroke; Susan de Vere

Philip Herbert, 5th Earl of Pembroke, 2nd Earl of Montgomery (1621 – 11 December 1669), was an English nobleman and politician.

== Life ==
He was the second son of Philip Herbert, 4th Earl of Pembroke, and his first wife Susan de Vere. In February 1632 he appeared with his elder brother Charles in the masque Tempe Restored at Whitehall Palace. Two months later the two boys matriculated at Exeter College, Oxford. In the summer of 1635 they embarked on a Continental tour. Charles contracted smallpox and died in Florence in early January 1636. As a result of his death Philip became the heir to their father's titles.

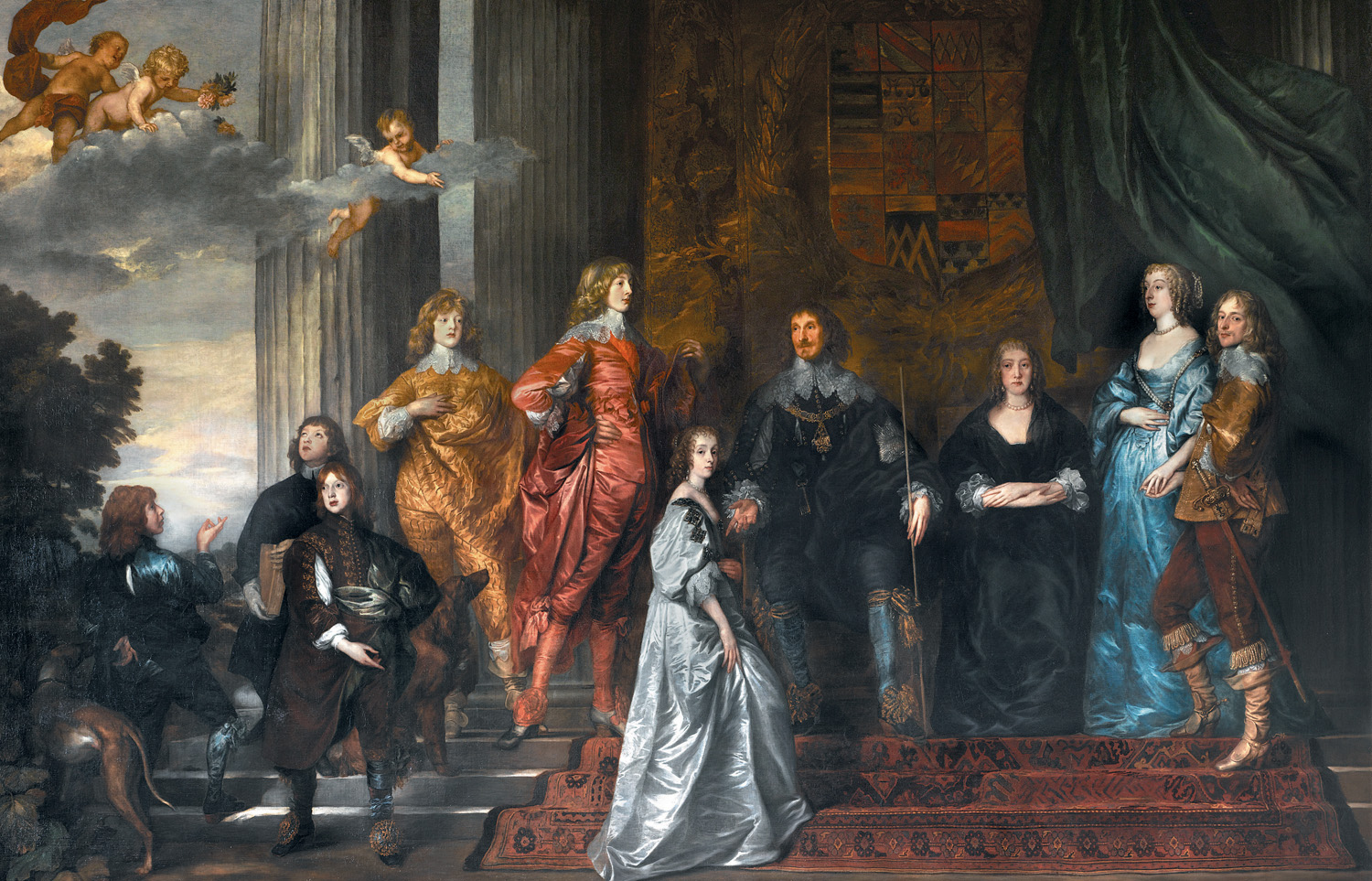
Portrait of Philip Herbert, 4th Earl of Pembroke, his wife Susan de Vere and his Family, by Anthony van Dyck.

In 1639 he became a captain in the Household Volunteer Regiment of Horse Guards. He was MP for Wiltshire in the Short Parliament of 1640. In the Long Parliament he sat initially for Glamorgan 1640–1649 and then Berkshire. Philip succeeded his father as earl in 1650 and served as a Councillor of State 1651-2.

At the coronation of Charles II he was Bearer of the Golden Spurs and Lord Cupbearer.

After the Restoration he was active in the Council for Trade, Fishery Corporation and the Royal Africa Company. He had been raised in a family sympathetic to Puritanism and himself became a Quaker According to Pepys, he had an idiosyncratic interpretation of the doctrine of Original Sin.

He died 11 December 1669 and was buried with no memorial in Salisbury cathedral.

== Family ==
In 1639 he married Penelope Naunton (1620–1647), widow of Paul Bayning, 2nd Viscount Bayning, and daughter of Sir Robert Naunton by his second wife, Penelope Perrot, widow of the astronomer Sir William Lower, and daughter of Sir Thomas Perrot and Dorothy Devereux.

- William Herbert, 6th Earl of Pembroke

In 1649, after the death of his first wife, he married Catherine Villiers (d. 1678), daughter of Sir William Villiers, 1st Baronet and his 3rd wife Rebecca, daughter of Robert Roper of Heanor, Derbyshire.

- Philip Herbert, 7th Earl of Pembroke
- Thomas Herbert, 8th Earl of Pembroke
- Susan, married John Poulett, 3rd Baron Poulett

On her death Catherine was also buried at Salisbury.

== Notes ==
Political offices
Preceded by The Marquess of Hertford	Lord Lieutenant of Somerset; 1640–1646; With: The Marquess of Hertford	English Interregnum
Honorary titles
English Interregnum	Custos Rotulorum of Glamorgan and Pembrokeshire; 1660–1669	Succeeded by The Earl of Pembroke
Peerage of England
Preceded by Philip Herbert	Earl of Pembroke; 1649–1669	Succeeded by William Herbert
Preceded by Philip Herbert	Earl of Montgomery; 1649–1669	Succeeded by William Herbert
