= Philip Herbert, 7th Earl of Pembroke =

English nobleman and convicted murderer

The Right Honourable The Earl of Pembroke KB
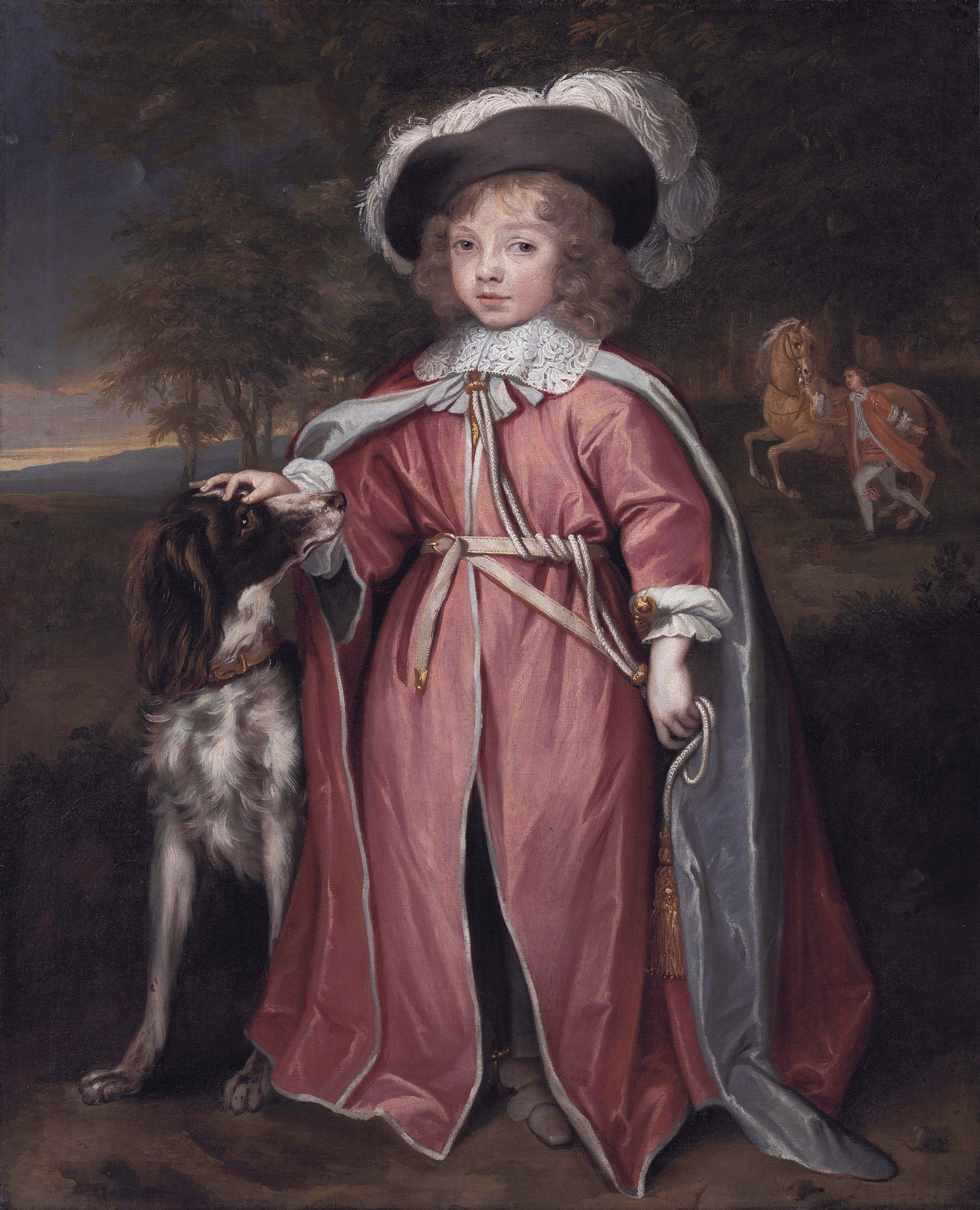
- Philip Herbert, at about the age of eight, in the robes of a Knight of the Bath (John Michael Wright)
- Born: 5 January 1652/53
- Died: 29 August 1683 (aged 30–31)
- Title: 7th Earl of Pembroke
- Predecessor: William Herbert, 6th Earl of Pembroke
- Successor: Thomas Herbert, 8th Earl of Pembroke
- Spouse: Henrietta de Kéroualle (m. 1674)
- Children: Charlotte Windsor, Viscountess Windsor
- Parents: Philip Herbert, 5th Earl of Pembroke (father); Katherine Villiers (mother)
- Relatives: William Herbert, 6th Earl of Pembroke (brother)

Philip Herbert, 7th Earl of Pembroke, 4th Earl of Montgomery KB (1652/53 – 29 August 1683) was an English nobleman, politician and serial killer who succeeded to the titles and estates of two earldoms on 8 July 1674 on the death of his brother William Herbert, 6th Earl of Pembroke.

Pembroke was prone to violent behaviour and was a convicted murderer, who has been called "the infamous Earl of Pembroke." Although the murder of the magistrate Sir Edmund Berry Godfrey, which sparked the Popish Plot, has never been solved, a strong body of evidence points to Pembroke as the killer.

== Early life ==
Baptised on 5 January 1652/53 and brought up in Wiltshire at Wilton House, Pembroke was the son of Philip Herbert, 5th Earl of Pembroke, being the eldest son of his father's second marriage to Katherine Villiers, a daughter of Sir William Villiers and his wife Rebecca Roper. His paternal grandmother was the 4th Earl's first wife, Susan de Vere; his step-grandmother was Anne Clifford, daughter of George Clifford, 3rd Earl of Cumberland, and widow of Richard Sackville, 3rd Earl of Dorset. He was created a Knight of the Bath at the coronation of King Charles II.

As he grew up, Herbert was considered to have inherited his mental instability from his grandfather Philip Herbert, 4th Earl of Pembroke: both were prone to violent and unprovoked assaults, although the grandson was by far the more violent character.

== Life and career ==
On 8 July 1674, when he was twenty-two years old, Herbert succeeded his elder half-brother William as Earl of Pembroke and Earl of Montgomery, and on 17 December the same year married Henrietta de Kéroualle, the sister of Charles II's mistress Louise de Kéroualle. By this marriage, Herbert had his only child, a daughter named Charlotte, who married firstly John Jeffreys, 2nd Baron Jeffreys, (son of the notorious George Jeffreys, 1st Baron Jeffreys), and secondly, Thomas Windsor, 1st Viscount Windsor. Charlotte died in 1733, leaving issue by both marriages. Her mother had died in 1728, having made a second marriage to Jean-Timoleon Gouffier, Marquis de Thois.

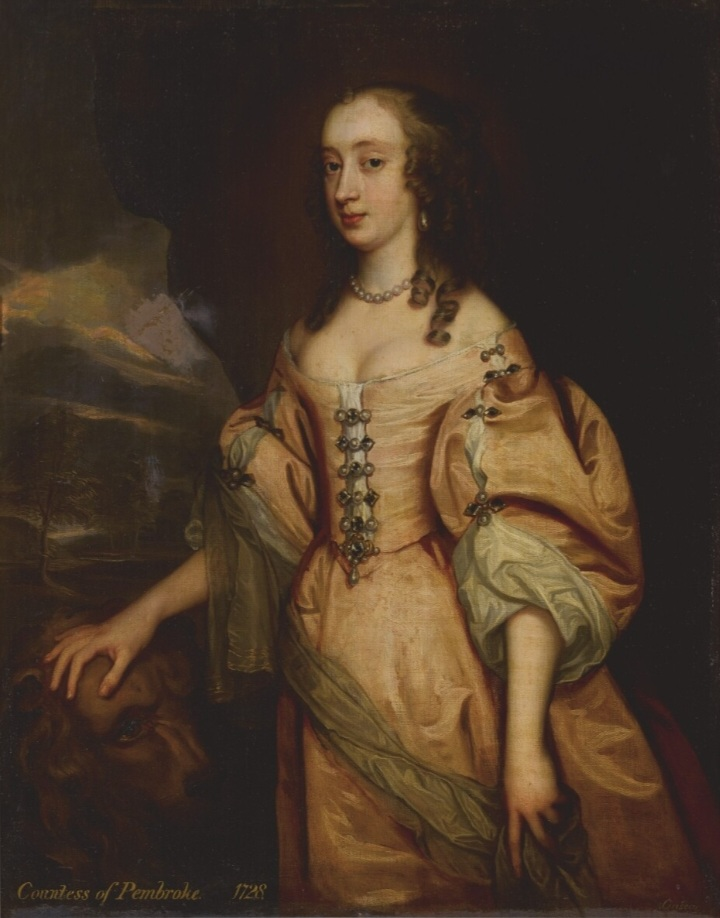
Portrait most likely of Henrietta de Kéroualle (1657–1728), by Peter Lely, 1728

Pembroke served as Custos Rotulorum ("Keeper of the Rolls") of Pembrokeshire and of Glamorgan from 1674, and as Custos Rotulorum and Lord Lieutenant of Wiltshire from 20 May 1675 until his death.

== Criminal record ==
From childhood on, especially when intoxicated, Pembroke was subject to fits of violence: he may have inherited his mental illness from his grandfather, the 4th Earl, who had been notorious for his sudden and unprovoked attacks on fellow peers. The 7th Earl was guilty of several assaults which might well have ended in death, and in 1677 he nearly killed a Mr. Vaughan in a duel.

On 28 January 1678, Charles II, not a man easily shocked, committed Pembroke to the Tower of London "for uttering such horrid and blasphemous words, and other actions proved upon oath, as are not fit to be repeated in any Christian assembly." One of the specific charges was "abuse of the Sacrament of the celebration of the Lord's Supper." Pembroke submitted a petition to the House of Lords for their assistance, denying everything alleged and praying that his fellow peers "will not believe the accusation, or your petitioner capable of so horrid a crime." The Lords then petitioned for Pembroke's release, with seven bishops and the Duke of York dissenting; the king released Pembroke on 30 January.

Less than a week later, on 5 February, a man named Philip Rycault complained to the House of Lords that Pembroke had assaulted him in the Strand, and the House ordered Pembroke to give a recognizance of £2,000 that he would thereafter keep the peace. However, by then Pembroke had already killed a man, Nathaniel Cony, whom he knocked down and kicked to death in a tavern for no apparent reason, and a few days later a Middlesex grand jury indicted him for murder. He was subsequently tried by his peers on 4 April and found not guilty of murder (by eighteen votes to six), but guilty of manslaughter. He successfully pleaded Privilege of peerage (i.e. the right to escape punishment for one's first offence), and he was discharged on payment of all fees. The Lord High Steward, the Duke of Ormonde, who presided at the trial, warned Pembroke that "his lordship would do well to take notice that no man could have the benefit of that statute but once." Pembroke, however, was incorrigible, and shortly afterwards made a savage assault on Charles Sackville, 6th Earl of Dorset, with whom he was engaged in a lawsuit.

=== Suspect in the Murder of Sir Edmund Godfrey ===
On 17 October 1678, Sir Edmund Godfrey, who had been foreman of the grand jury which indicted Pembroke for the murder of Cony, was found dead in a ditch on Primrose Hill, impaled with his own sword. This unexplained death caused an anti-Catholic uproar, generally known as the Popish Plot. Author John Dickson Carr, in a book about Godfrey's death, examines the contemporary evidence and concludes that Pembroke murdered Godfrey in a revenge killing. This theory was later considered and supported by the historian Hugh Ross Williamson. Another historian, John Philipps Kenyon, while raising some difficulties with the theory, agreed that of all the suspects Pembroke had by far the strongest motive for killing Godfrey.

=== His last murder, final years ===
In 1680, writer John Aubrey noted that Pembroke had at Wilton "52 mastives and 30 grey-hounds, some beares, and a lyon, and a matter of 60 fellowes more bestial then they."

On 18 August 1680, Pembroke killed William Smeeth, an officer of the watch, following a drunken evening in a tavern at Turnham Green. On 21 June 1681, the grand jury of Middlesex again indicted him for murder. As Ormonde had warned him, he could not claim the privilege of peerage a second time, and he briefly fled the country. Remarkably, though, following a petition to the king signed by twenty-four of his fellow peers, he was granted a royal pardon.

== Death ==
Pembroke died aged 30 on 29 August 1683 and was succeeded by his brother Thomas. Thomas petitioned the House of Lords to be allowed to sell some of his brother's estates in order to provide for his niece, Lady Charlotte. Philip was buried in Salisbury Cathedral.

== See also ==
- List of serial killers in the United Kingdom

Honorary titles
Preceded by The 6th Earl of Pembroke	Custos Rotulorum of Pembrokeshire; 1674–1683	Succeeded by The 8th Earl of Pembroke
Preceded by The 6th Earl of Pembroke	Custos Rotulorum of Glamorgan; 1674–1683	Succeeded by The 8th Earl of Pembroke
Preceded by The Duke of Somerset	Lord Lieutenant of Wiltshire; 1675–1683	Succeeded by The 8th Earl of Pembroke
Preceded by The Duke of Somerset	Custos Rotulorum of Wiltshire; 1675–1683	Succeeded by The Viscount Weymouth
Peerage of England
Preceded by William Herbert	Earl of Pembroke; Earl of Montgomery; 1674–1683	Succeeded by Thomas Herbert
