= Henry Herbert, 2nd Earl of Pembroke =

English noble (1538–1601)

The Right Honourable The Earl of Pembroke KG KB
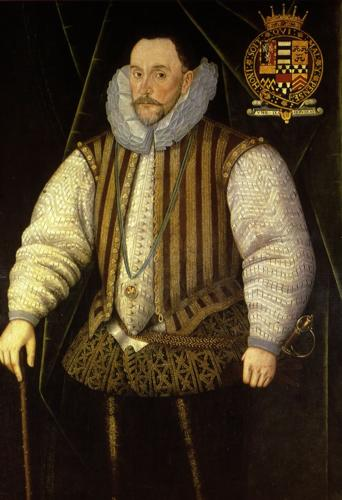
- Born: c. 1538
- Died: 19 January 1601 (aged 62–63); Wilton, England
- Buried: Salisbury Cathedral, Salisbury, England
- Noble family: Herbert
- Spouses: Lady Katherine Grey; Lady Katherine Talbot; Mary Sidney
- Issue: William Herbert, 3rd Earl of Pembroke; Philip Herbert, 4th Earl of Pembroke; Lady Anne Herbert; Katherine Herbert
- Father: William Herbert, 1st Earl of Pembroke
- Mother: Anne Parr, Countess of Pembroke

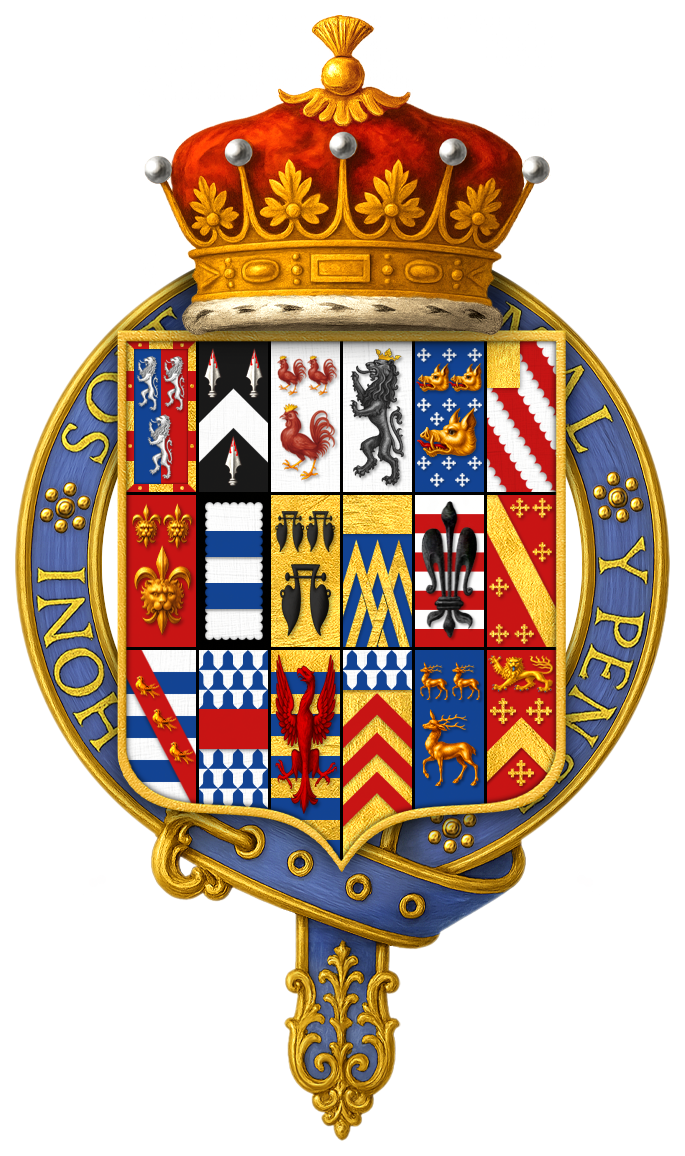
The quartered arms of Lord Pembroke

Lord Pembroke's coat of arms: Per pale azure and gules, three lions rampant argent

Henry Herbert, 2nd Earl of Pembroke, KG, KB (c. 1538 – 19 January 1601) was an English peer and politician. He was the nephew of Catherine Parr and brother-in-law of Lady Jane Grey through his first wife. During Elizabeth I's reign, he held administrative positions in Wales. Politically, he was associated with Robert Dudley.

== Life ==
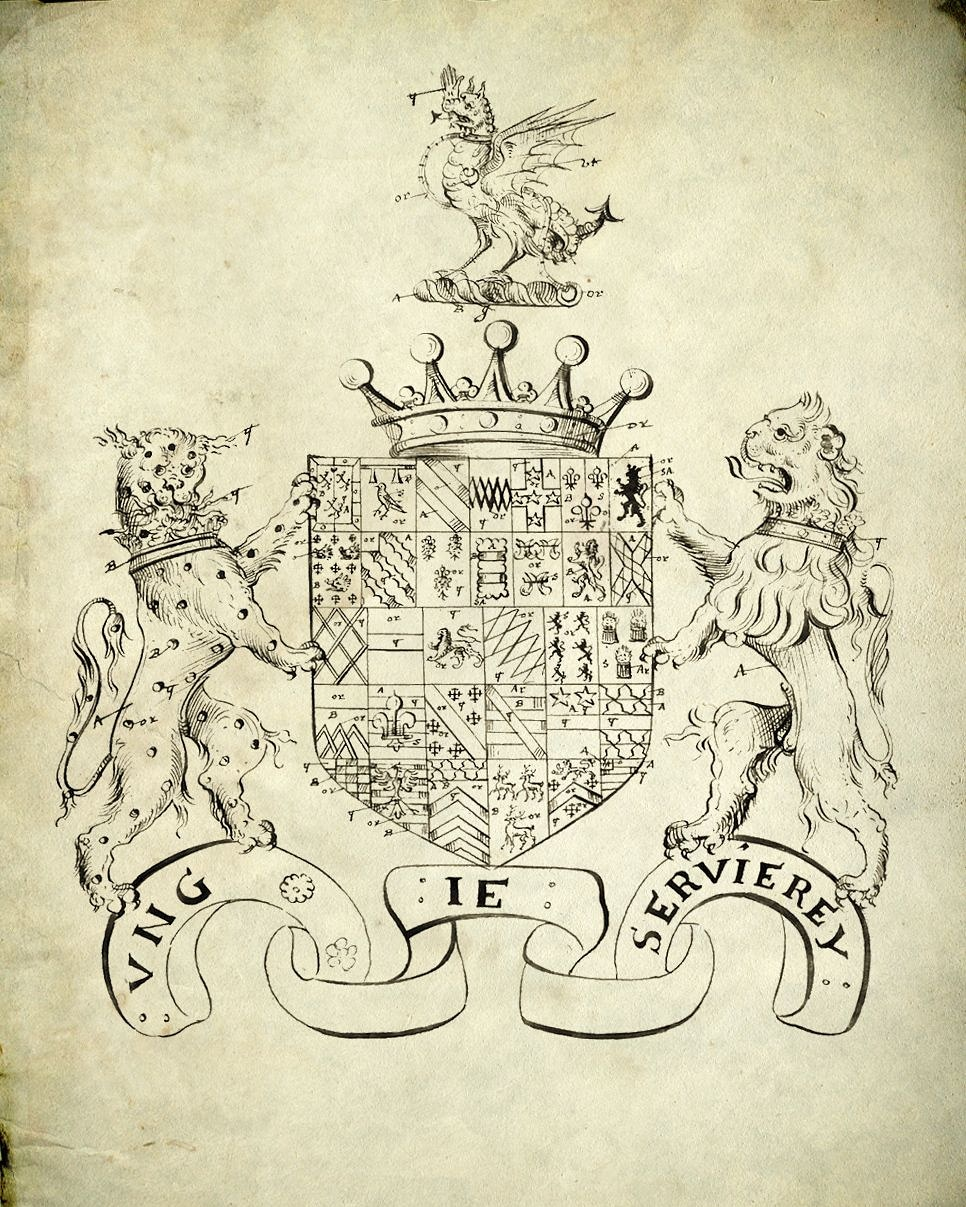
Arms of 2nd Earl of Pembroke as recorded by York Herald, 1620

He was the son of William Herbert, 1st Earl of Pembroke, and Anne Parr. His aunt was Queen Consort Katherine Parr, last wife of King Henry VIII. His uncle was William Parr, 1st Marquess of Northampton, who was an influential man during the reigns of Edward VI and Elizabeth I. Herbert was responsible for the costly restoration of Cardiff Castle. Pembroke, like other members of his family, was a man of culture. He was a special patron of antiquaries and heralds and collected heraldic manuscripts.

Herbert was educated at Peterhouse, Cambridge, under Archbishop John Whitgift. He is also said to have studied at Douay. In 1554, while his father was entertaining the entourage of Philip II of Spain's men at Wilton House, Herbert's discreet manners caught the attention of the Marquis de las Navas and he was made a gentleman of the chamber to King Philip upon his arrival in England. In 1557, he took part in a tournament held before Queen Mary I, and accompanied his father to the siege of St Quentin.

On his father's death in 1570, he succeeded to the Earldom of Pembroke and on 4 April 1570 was appointed Lord Lieutenant of Wiltshire. In right of his mother, Anne Parr, he succeeded as Lord Parr and Ros of Kendal, Lord FitzHugh, Lord Marmion, and Lord Quentin on 1 August 1571.

== Court life ==
In the court intrigues of Elizabeth I's reign, Pembroke was regarded as a partisan of Robert Dudley, 1st Earl of Leicester, and was certainly in very intimate relations with him. He took a prominent part in the trials of the 4th Duke of Norfolk; Mary, Queen of Scots in October 1586; and Norfolk's son Philip Howard, Earl of Arundel, in 1589.

In 1586, he succeeded his father-in-law, Sir Henry Sidney, as Lord President of Wales, a position he held until his death, and became at about the same time Vice-Admiral of South Wales. From thenceforth, he spent much time at Ludlow Castle, the official residence of the president of Wales where he actively discharged the duties of his office.

During the 1590s, Herbert was patron of Pembroke's Men, a theatre company who were the first group to perform a number of plays including The Isle of Dogs by Thomas Nashe and Ben Jonson.

In 1595, Pembroke was described as 'very pursife and maladise' and by September 1599, 'his life was despaired of'. Herbert died at Wilton House leaving his lady 'as bare as he could and bestowing all on the young lord even to her jewels'. He was buried in Salisbury Cathedral.

== Marriages and issue ==
He was married to Lady Katherine Grey, sister of Lady Jane Grey, on 25 May 1553, in a political match arranged by their parents in the hopes of assisting the Duke of Northumberland with his plan to secure the succession of Jane who on the same day alongside her sister married the Duke's younger son, Lord Guildford Dudley. The union was never consummated, and in 1554, Queen Mary I's influence led to the consent of Herbert's father's dissolution of the marriage.

His second wife was Lady Katherine Talbot, whom he married in 1563, in a double wedding with their siblings Francis, Lord Talbot and Lady Anne Herbert. Katherine and Francis were children of George Talbot, 6th Earl of Shrewsbury, and his wife Lady Gertrude Manners, daughter of Thomas Manners, 1st Earl of Rutland. Queen Elizabeth I was extremely fond of Lady Katherine and when Katherine developed a fatal illness she often visited her at Baynard's Castle. She died in 1575 leaving no children by Herbert.

By April 1577, Herbert married his third wife, the Mary Sidney, daughter of Sir Henry Sidney and Lady Mary Dudley, daughter of John Dudley, 1st Duke of Northumberland, thus a younger sister of Guilford Dudley. Their children included William and Philip (who both were Earl of Pembroke after their father), Katherine (who died as a small child), and Lady Anne Herbert, who died young.

== Legacy ==
The armour of Henry Herbert is now on display at the Metropolitan Museum of Art in New York in the Arms and Armor galleries. It was made in 1580 at the Greenwich armoury, a royal workshop founded by Henry VIII to produce armour for the English nobility, chiefly Henry, without having to commission it from overseas. His portrait, and that of his father William, are on display at the National Museum Wales in Cardiff, adjacent to Cardiff Castle which the family owned and occupied for much of the 16th century.

Political offices
Preceded by The Earl of Pembroke	Custos Rotulorum of Glamorgan; 1570–1601	Succeeded by John Herbert
Preceded by The Earl of Pembroke	Lord Lieutenant of Wiltshire; 1570–1601	Succeeded by The Earl of Hertford
Preceded by Sir John Thynne	Custos Rotulorum of Wiltshire bef. 1584–1601	Succeeded by The Earl of Hertford
Unknown	Lord Lieutenant of Somerset; 1585–1601	Succeeded by The Earl of Hertford
Preceded by Sir Henry Sidney	Lord President of Wales; Lord Lieutenant of Wales, Herefordshire, Shropshire and Worcestershire; 1587–1601	Succeeded by The Lord Zouche
Preceded by Sir Henry Sidney	Lord Lieutenant of Glamorgan and Monmouthshire; 1587–1601	Succeeded by The Earl of Worcester
Preceded by William Herbert	Custos Rotulorum of Monmouthshire bef. 1594–1601	Succeeded by The Earl of Worcester
Peerage of England
Preceded by William Herbert	Earl of Pembroke; 1570–1601	Succeeded by William Herbert
