= Philip Herbert, 4th Earl of Pembroke =

English courtier (1584–1650)

The Right Honorable The Earl of Pembroke and Montgomery KG KB PC
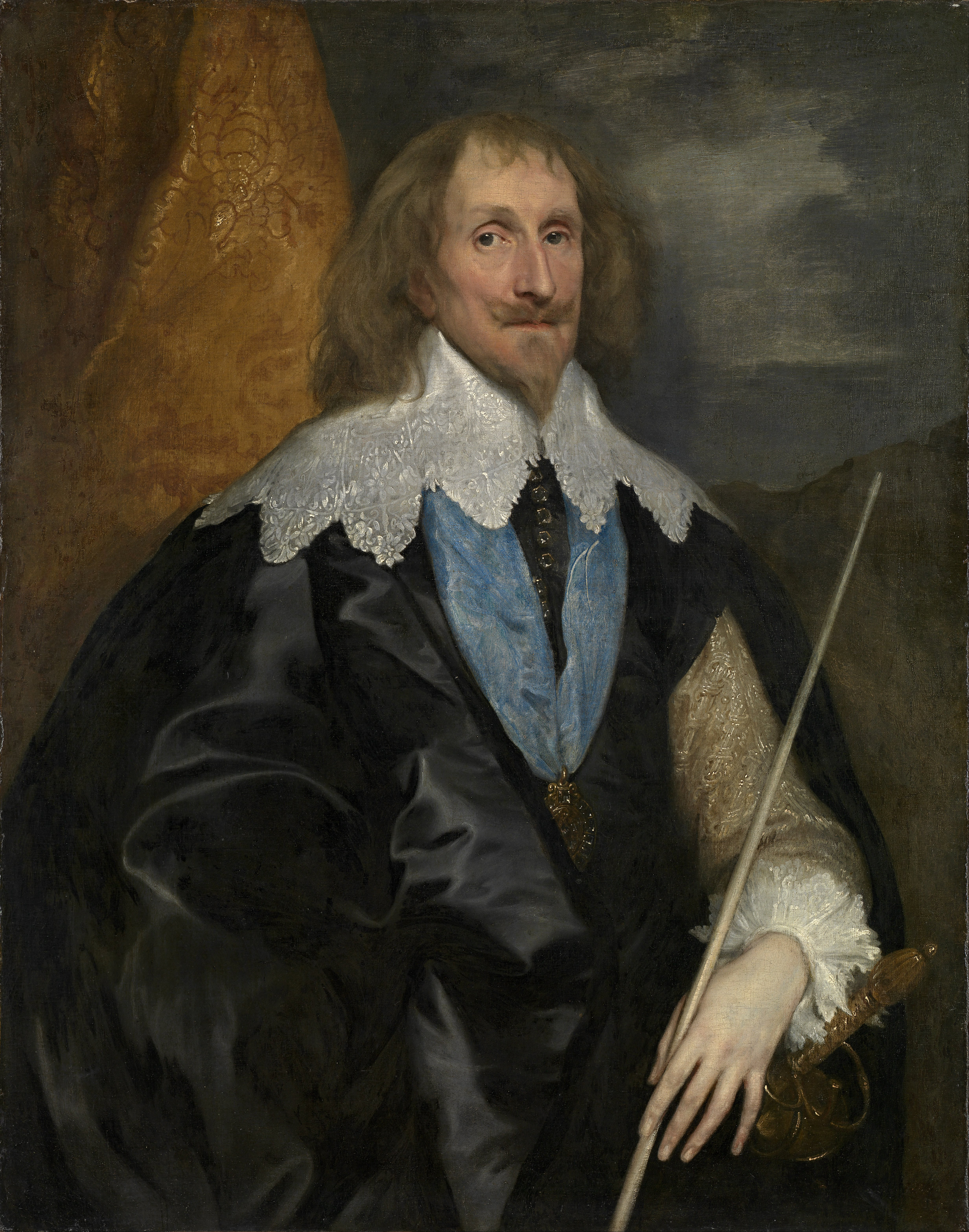
- Portrait by Anthony van Dyck, c. 1634
- Born: 10 October 1584; Wilton House, Wiltshire, England
- Died: 23 January 1650 (aged 65); Palace of Whitehall, London, England
- Buried: Salisbury Cathedral
- Noble family: Herbert
- Spouses: Susan de Vere; Lady Anne Clifford
- Issue: Lady Anne Sophia Herbert, Countess of Carnarvon; Sir Charles Herbert; Philip Herbert, 5th Earl of Pembroke; Hon. James Herbert
- Father: Henry Herbert, 2nd Earl of Pembroke
- Mother: Mary Sidney

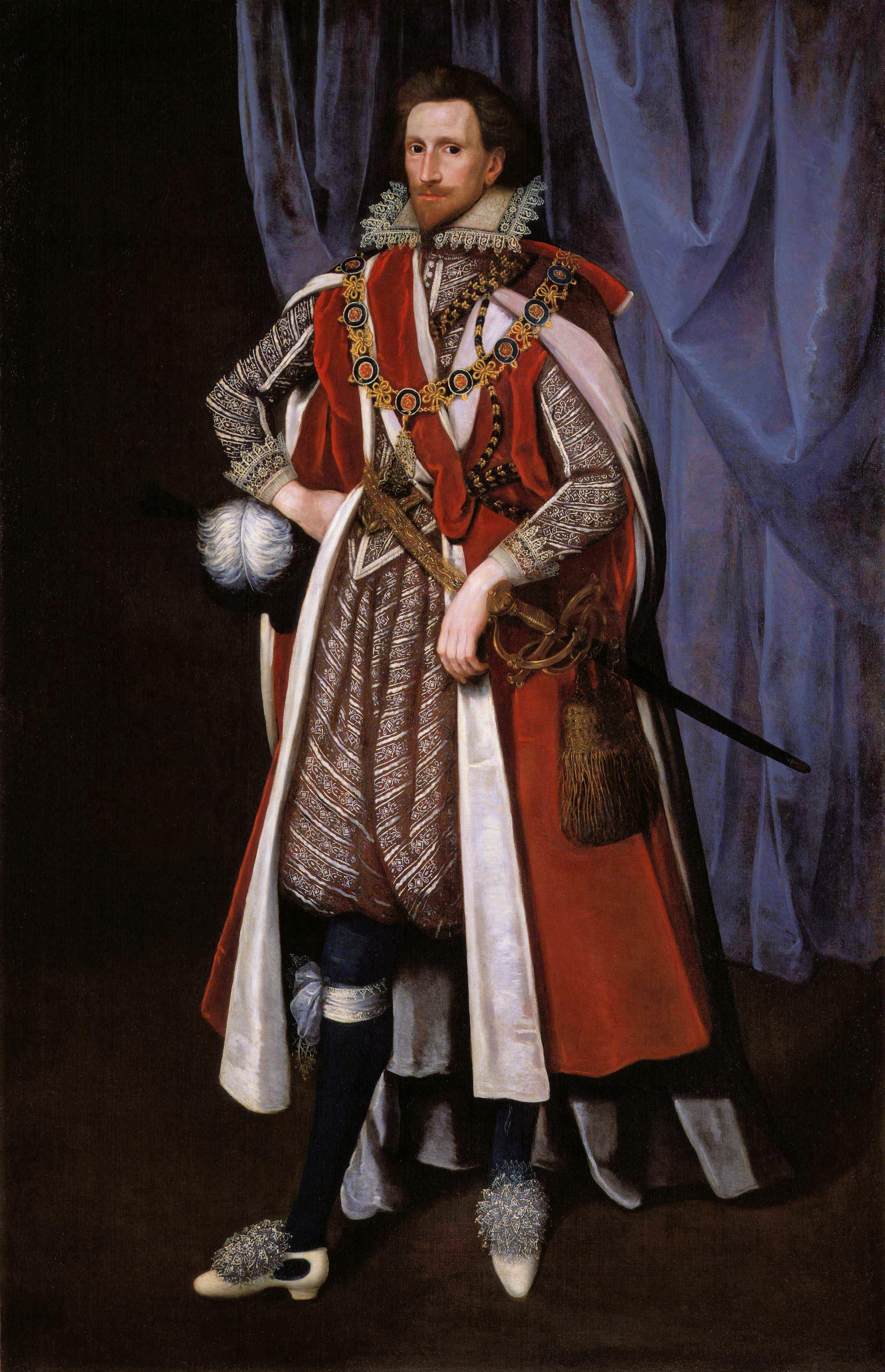
Philip Herbert, 4th Earl of Pembroke, in the robes of the Order of the Garter c. 1615. Unknown artist, National Portrait Gallery, London.

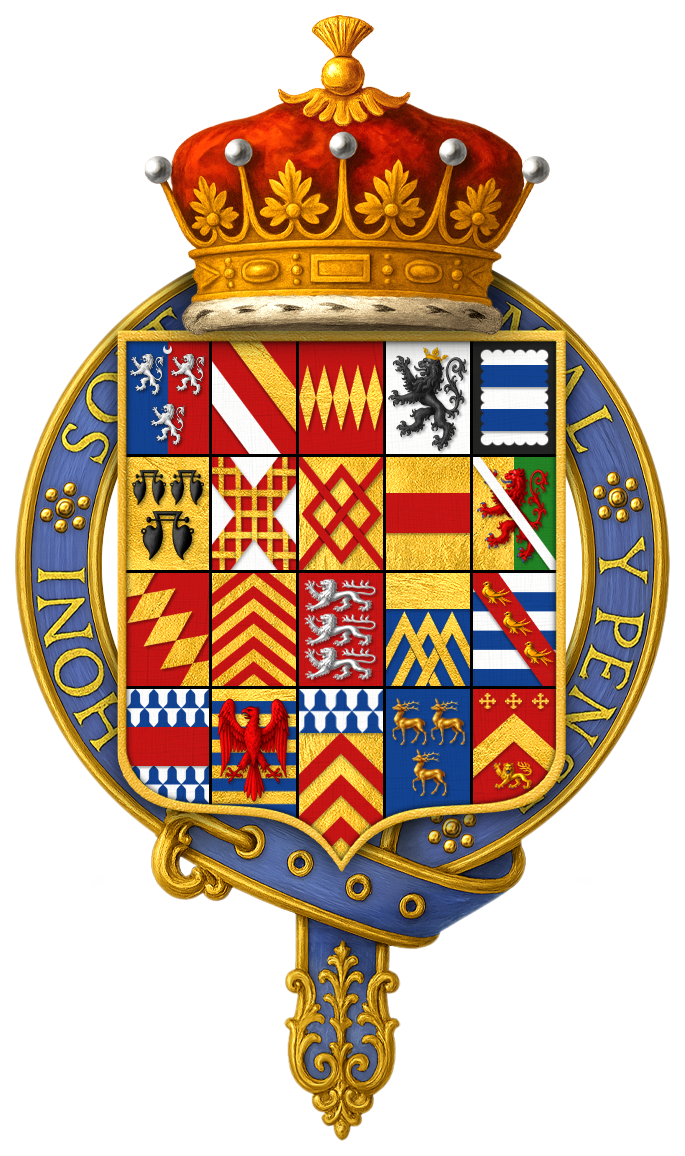
Quartered arms Sir Philip Herbert, Earl of Pembroke, KG

Philip Herbert, 4th Earl of Pembroke and 1st Earl of Montgomery, KG, KB, PC (10 October 1584 – 23 January 1650) was an English courtier, nobleman, and politician active during the reigns of James I and Charles I. He married Susan de Vere, the youngest daughter of Edward de Vere, 17th Earl of Oxford. Philip and his older brother William were the "incomparable pair of brethren" to whom the First Folio of Shakespeare's collected works was dedicated in 1623.

== Early life, 1584–1603 ==
Born at Wilton House, he was the son of Henry Herbert, 2nd Earl of Pembroke, and his third wife, Mary Sidney, sister of Sir Philip Sidney the poet, after whom he was named.

In 1593, at age 9, Philip was sent to study at New College, Oxford, but left after a few months.

== Favourite of James I, 1603–1625 ==
In 1600 the 16-year-old Philip made his first appearance at court. On the accession of James I in 1603 he soon caught the king's eye. According to Edward Hyde, 1st Earl of Clarendon, and John Aubrey, Philip's major interests at the time were hunting and hawking and it was in these fields that he first drew the king's attention. In May 1603, James made Philip a gentleman of the privy chamber and a Knight of the Bath in July of the same year. Some historians believe that Philip and James had a sexual relationship as well around this time.

Philip Herbert and his brother William, performed in The Masque of Indian and China Knights at Hampton Court on 1 January 1604. On 27 December 1604, with James I's enthusiastic urging (he played a prominent role in the ceremony and provided generous financial gifts for the bride), Philip married Susan de Vere, the youngest daughter of Edward de Vere, 17th Earl of Oxford. That same year he was elected Member of Parliament for Glamorgan.

James continued bestowing favours throughout 1605, first making Philip a gentleman of the bedchamber and then creating him Baron Herbert of Shurland and Earl of Montgomery. In addition, James had Montgomery created MA during a visit of Oxford. In addition to hunting and hawking, Montgomery regularly participated in this period in tournaments and court masques. He also took an interest in gambling and amassed large debts, which James paid off for him in 1606/1607. In 1608, James made him a Knight of the Garter. He had him appointed high steward of Oxford in 1615.

When Montgomery had a noted quarrel with Henry Wriothesley, 3rd Earl of Southampton, after a game of tennis between the two in 1610, James stepped in to effect a reconciliation. Montgomery had a second violent quarrel, this time with Lord Howard de Walden, in 1617. He was to become notorious for his violent assaults, which were usually unprovoked, but he was invariably forgiven by the King.

Montgomery took a keen interest in English colonial ventures, which were just taking off at this time, and was involved with several joint stock companies: he became a member of the council of the Virginia Company in 1612; was one of the original incorporators of the Northwest Passage Company in 1612; and became a member of the Honourable East India Company in 1614.

Honours continued throughout the remainder of James' reign: Montgomery became keeper of the Palace of Westminster and St. James's Park in 1617; Lord Lieutenant of Kent in 1624; and finally, in December 1624, a member of the privy council.

The Earl of Montgomery produced a masque entertainment at Elsyng Palace, Enfield, in December 1618, performed by male courtiers and attended by Lucy Russell, Countess of Bedford. The theme was a country wedding and George Goring played a farmer's son. According to Gerard Herbert, the masque was performed again at Theobalds for King James.

== Continued favour under Charles I ==
After Charles I's accession to the throne in 1625, Montgomery continued to receive royal favour. He was appointed to the embassy which accompanied Henrietta Maria from Paris to England and went on to hold the spurs at Charles' coronation in 1626, before succeeding his older brother as Lord Chamberlain. He was made Lord Lieutenant of Buckinghamshire in 1628. (Montgomery was a friend of George Villiers, 1st Duke of Buckingham, serving as godfather of Buckingham's son Lord Charles Herbert, and in 1626 agreeing to a betrothal between his 4-year-old daughter and Lord Charles Herbert.)

Montgomery continued to be interested in colonial ventures under Charles I. He was an incorporator of the Guiana Company in 1626. In 1628, he received a grant of the islands of Trinidad, Tobago and Barbados.

Montgomery's first wife died in early 1629, and in 1630 he remarried, to Lady Anne Clifford, daughter of George Clifford, 3rd Earl of Cumberland, and widow of Richard Sackville, 3rd Earl of Dorset.

Montgomery's older brother died in 1630, and he succeeded to the title of Earl of Pembroke and to several of his brother's other titles, including Lord Lieutenant of Somerset and Lord Lieutenant of Cornwall. He was soon appointed to his brother's former positions of high steward of the Duchy of Cornwall and Lord Warden of the Stannaries.

Pembroke maintained a large household of 80 at his home in London, and an even larger staff of over 150 at Wilton House, his family's ancestral seat in Wiltshire. Through the 1630s, Pembroke entertained Charles I at Wilton House for a hunting expedition every year. He encouraged Pembroke to rebuild Wilton House in the Palladian style, recommending Inigo Jones for the job (Salomon de Caus performed the work when Jones proved to be unavailable, while his brother, Isaac de Caus, designed a variety of formal and informal gardens for the property).

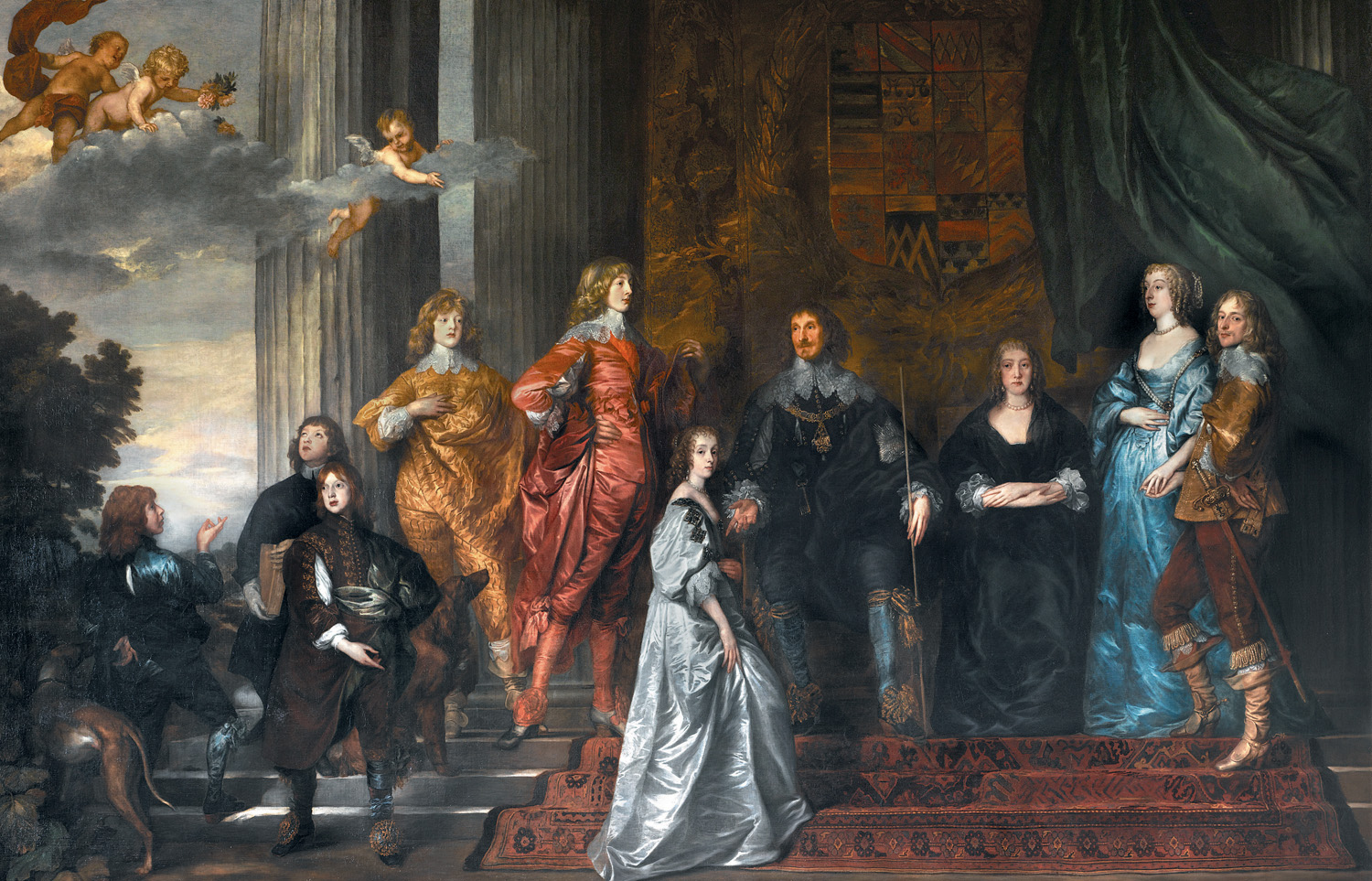
The Pembroke family – Philip Herbert, 4th Earl of Pembroke, seated with his second wife Lady Anne Clifford (in black), surrounded by his family. He holds the white staff of his office of Lord Chamberlain and reaches forward to Lady Mary Villers (in white), the daughter of George Villiers, 1st Duke of Buckingham, gesturing towards the heart of the young woman who is about to marry his son, Charles Lord Herbert (in scarlet) aside Philip Herbert (in orange). At the left the three young Herbert boys, William, James and John with books, framed by their dogs. At the right daughter Anne Sophia and her husband Robert Dormer, 1st Earl of Carnarvon. The three young Herberts who died as infants above as putti in the clouds throwing roses, painted 1634-35 by Anthony van Dyck.

=== Patron of culture ===
Pembroke was a fan of painting and a member of the Whitehall group. He amassed a large art collection and was a patron of Anthony van Dyck. This love of painting was shared with Charles I: in 1637, when Pope Urban VIII sent Charles a large shipment of paintings, Pembroke was one of a select group invited by Charles to join him in opening the cases (the group also included Henrietta Maria, Inigo Jones, and Henry Rich, 1st Earl of Holland). Pembroke promoted the artistic career of his page, Richard Gibson, who became a successful portrait miniaturist.

Pembroke was an active patron of literature, receiving the dedication of over forty books during his lifetime, beginning with the dedication of the English edition of Amadis de Gaula in 1619. His most famous dedication was that of Shakespeare's first folio, which was dedicated to Philip and his elder brother. Pembroke was also notably the patron of Philip Massinger and of Pembroke's relative George Herbert (in 1630 he intervened with Charles to have George Herbert appointed to a rectory in Wiltshire).

== Break with Charles I, 1639–1642 ==
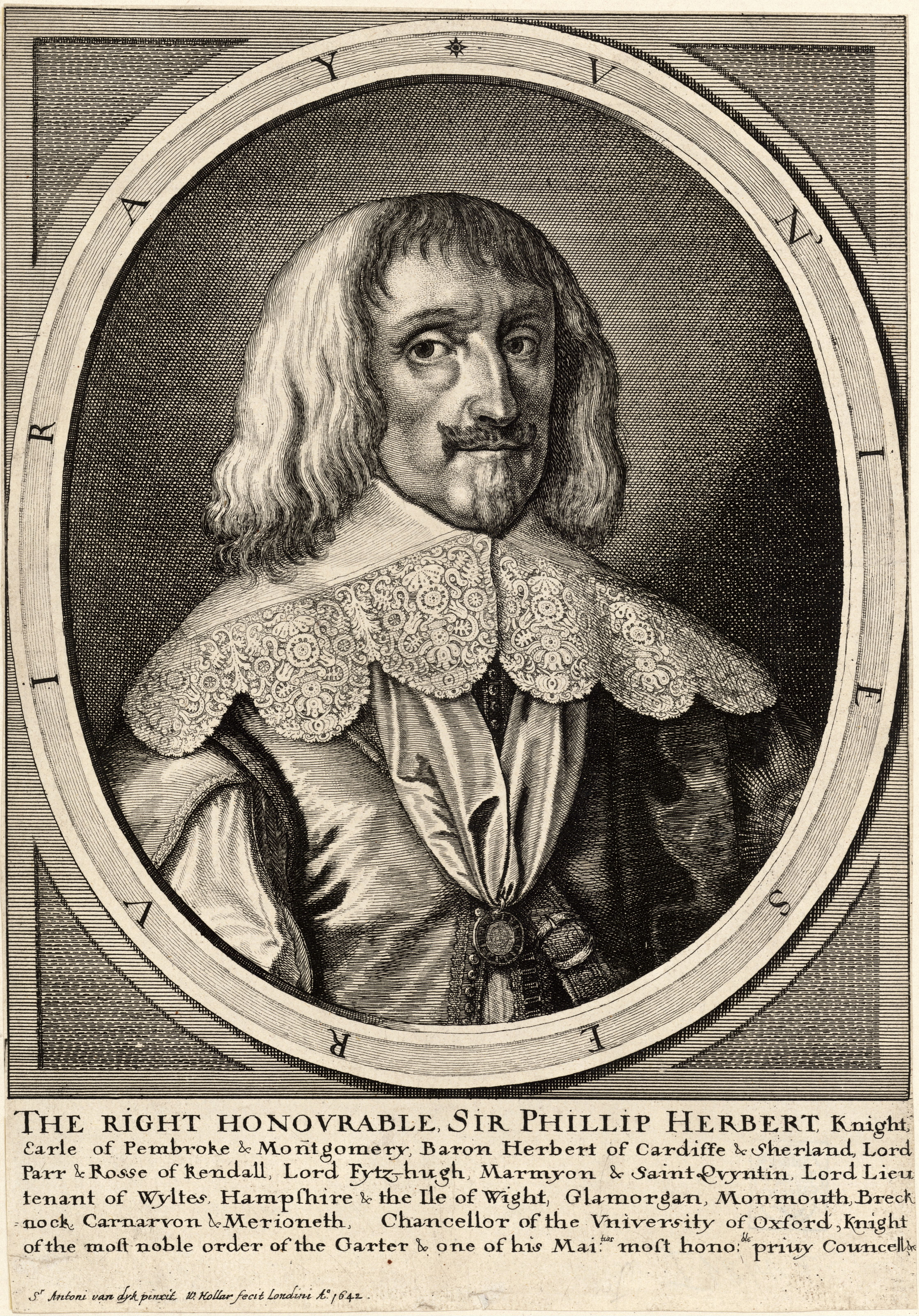
A 1642 engraving of Pembroke by Wenceslas Hollar after a 1634 painting of Anthony van Dyck

Although Pembroke and Charles bonded over their shared interest in art and architecture, they did not agree on the question of religion. Pembroke was inclined to favour "godly Protestantism" and sympathetic to Puritanism. This led him into conflict with Charles' queen, Henrietta Maria, who was a Roman Catholic. Pembroke was also opposed to the ascent of William Laud, who was narrowly elected to Pembroke's older brother's old office of Chancellor of the University of Oxford in 1630 and became Archbishop of Canterbury in 1633.

Given his religious inclination, Pembroke was sympathetic to the Covenanters during the Bishops' Wars and strongly favoured peace. Pembroke served as Charles' commissioner during the negotiations with the Scots at Berwick and Ripon, where several of the Scots, notably the Earl of Rothes, believed that Pembroke was secretly in favour of the Scottish position. Pembroke, however, continued to profess his loyalty to Charles, though, along with Henry Rich, 1st Earl of Holland and William Cecil, 2nd Earl of Salisbury, he urged the king to accept the Scots' terms. The king, however, ordered Pembroke to return to London to begin raising funds for further war with the Scots.

Pembroke's extensive land holdings gained him much influence during the elections to the Short and Long Parliaments, with approximately a dozen members of the House of Commons owing their elections to his patronage. These men did not seem to constitute a Pembroke faction in the Commons, though there were signs that he patronized men known to be opponents of Charles' policy of Thorough.

In 1641, Pembroke voted in favour of the bill of attainder against Thomas Wentworth, 1st Earl of Strafford. During this period, Charles became especially angry when Pembroke gave encouraging words to an anti-Strafford crowd. Upon the queen's urging, Charles determined to remove Pembroke from his post as Lord Chamberlain. The pretext came when Pembroke had yet another of his violent altercations, this time striking Henry Howard, Lord Maltravers with a cane during a committee meeting of the House of Lords. Charles demanded Pembroke's resignation, replacing him with Robert Devereux, 3rd Earl of Essex. This marked Pembroke's final break with Charles.

== Role in the English Civil War, 1642–1648 ==
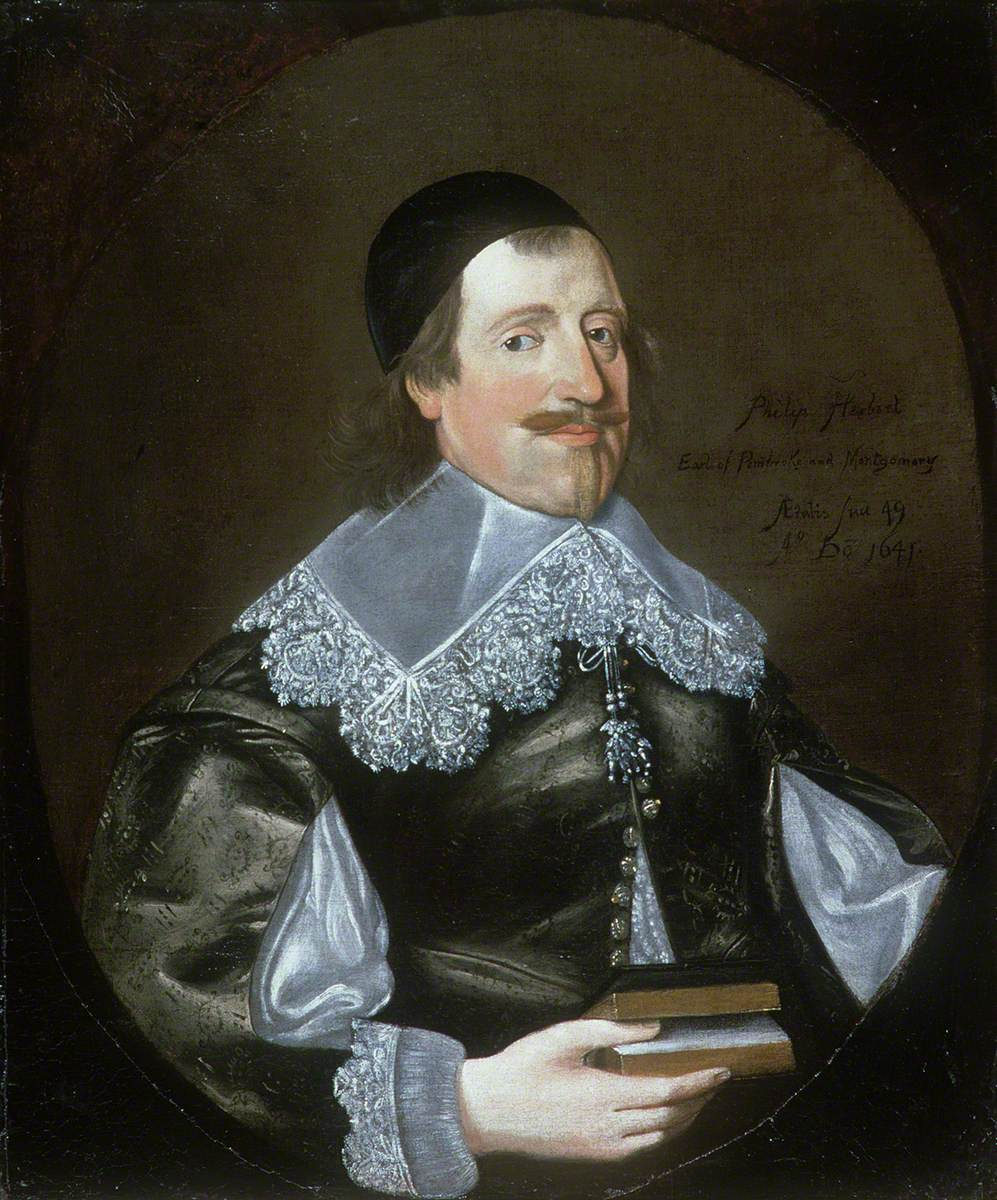
Philip Herbert

With the coming of the First English Civil War, Pembroke sided with the parliamentarians, although he was always one of the most moderate of them.

Parliament regularly employed Pembroke and the Earl of Holland during its negotiations with Charles. Initially, Pembroke maintained contacts with Edward Hyde and professed continued loyalty to Charles. However, he became one of five peers to sit on the English Committee of Safety, established in July 1642, and in August 1642 accepted the office of Governor of the Isle of Wight from Parliament. In 1645, Parliament named Pembroke Lord Lieutenant of Somerset and voted to raise him to the status of duke.

Pembroke represented Parliament during the negotiations with the king at Oxford in January 1643, and was present during the Treaty of Uxbridge in 1645.

As a supporter of the godly cause, Pembroke was appointed to the Westminster Assembly in 1643 as a lay assessor. Pembroke supported the moderate episcopalian faction in the Assembly (most associated with James Ussher, Archbishop of Armagh), and remained fiercely opposed to the presbyterian and Independent parties in the Assembly. George Morley, future Bishop of Winchester served as Pembroke's domestic chaplain, and Pembroke was a member of St Martin-in-the-Fields, where he worshipped regularly. As such, in the House of Lords, Pembroke voted in favour of the bill of attainder against Archbishop Laud in 1645, but in 1646 voted to reject a petition in favour of presbyterianism submitted by the City of London.

During the politics of the 1640s, Pembroke was initially linked with the group of lords headed by William Fiennes, 1st Viscount Saye and Sele and Algernon Percy, 10th Earl of Northumberland, which supported the Self-denying Ordinance and the creation of the New Model Army in 1645. By mid-1646, however, Pembroke was distancing himself from the group and became one of the outspoken opponents of the New Model Army, favouring its immediate disbandment. After the anti-New Model Army riots in London in July 1647, Pembroke refused to join the Saye-Northumberland group, who left the capital and joined the army at this time. Pembroke quickly changed his tune in August, however, when the New Model Army marched into London: he then claimed that he had previously been acting under duress and that he had always been a supporter of the New Model Army.

After Laud's arrest in 1641, the University of Oxford elected Pembroke to replace him as chancellor. (Pembroke, who was at the time allied with Saye, nominated Saye to replace him as high steward when he left the post to take up the chancellorship.) When royalist forces took Oxford, they removed Pembroke, installing the marquess of Hertford in his place, but, after Parliament took Oxford, it had Pembroke re-installed as chancellor in 1647 and ordered him to reform the university. The visitors of the university began this work under the direction of a committee of both houses chaired by Pembroke. They ordered all university officers to take the Solemn League and Covenant, and when the heads of houses complained, Pembroke summoned them to the committee and berated them. In February 1648, he installed a new vice-chancellor and replaced many heads of houses. Then in March, Parliament ordered him to take up office in person. So he travelled to Oxford and presided over the Convocation, putting an end to resistance to the reforms. Yet Pembroke, though a patron of literature, was far from a man of letters himself and became the subject of bitter satires written by royalists during the period.

== Role in the crisis of 1648–1649 ==
Pembroke believed the king was crucial to any settlement of hostilities between king and Parliament. He vehemently opposed the Vote of No Addresses in 1647–1648, refusing to leave Wilton House (where he was attending to rebuilding in the wake of a 1647 fire) to attend the debate in the House of Lords. In July 1648, Pembroke voted that James Hamilton, 1st Duke of Hamilton be declared a traitor for leading Scottish forces into England and sought to have royalists who aided Hamilton declared traitors. In July 1648, Pembroke again negotiated with the king, this time pursuant to the Treaty of Newport.

These negotiations ended abruptly with Pride's Purge of December 1648, after which Pembroke and several other parliamentary commissioners negotiating at Newport sent a deputation to Thomas Fairfax, assuring him they continued to support the army. However, they continued to seek a deal with the king. In late December 1648, Pembroke joined a deputation led by Basil Feilding, 2nd Earl of Denbigh, putting to the Army Council to accept a deal whereby Charles would lose his negative voice and agree to not attempt to restore episcopal lands which had been alienated by Parliament.

The Army Council rejected the proposal but wished to continue to have good relations with Pembroke. It soon agreed to let the Rump Parliament name Pembroke Constable of Windsor Castle (the House of Lords had been trying to appoint Pembroke to the position since July but had not yet received the support of the House of Commons), making him essentially the king's jailer. Pembroke appointed Bulstrode Whitelocke as his deputy. In January 1649, Pembroke was appointed to the High Court of Justice established by the Rump Parliament to try Charles I on charges of high treason. Pembroke refused to take part, though he agreed not to speak out against executing the king.

In February, after the execution of the king, the Rump appointed Pembroke to the English Council of State. Since the House of Lords had been abolished in the wake of Charles' execution, Pembroke had to stand for election to Parliament: he was returned as member for Berkshire in April 1649.

=== Death ===
In May 1649, Pembroke fell ill and spent the rest of 1649 bedridden. He died in his chambers alone in Whitehall, Westminster on 23 January 1650.

Pembroke's body was embalmed and transported to Salisbury to be buried in Salisbury Cathedral. The English Council of State ordered all members of Barebone's Parliament to accompany his cortège for two or three miles on its journey out of London.

== Issue ==
Herbert married first Lady Susan de Vere (26 May 1587 – 1628/1629), daughter of Edward de Vere, 17th Earl of Oxford. They had seven sons and three daughters, including:

- Lady Anne Sophia Herbert married Robert Dormer, 1st Earl of Carnarvon, and had issue.
- Sir Charles Herbert, Lord Herbert of Shurland (c. 1619–1635), married Lady Mary Villiers, daughter of George Villiers, 1st Duke of Buckingham, and had no issue.
- Philip Herbert, 5th Earl of Pembroke (c. 1621–1669)
- Hon. James Herbert (c. 1623–1677), of Kingsey, Buckinghamshire
- Hon. Henry Herbert (died young)

Philip Herbert married secondly Lady Anne Clifford, de jure Baroness de Clifford (30 January 1590 – 22 March 1676), daughter of George Clifford, 3rd Earl of Cumberland and widow of Richard Sackville, 3rd Earl of Dorset, on 1 June 1630. They had no issue.

His grandson Philip Herbert, 7th Earl of Pembroke, was a homicidal maniac; it has been suggested that his mental instability was inherited from his grandfather, who was also prone to making sudden and violent assaults.

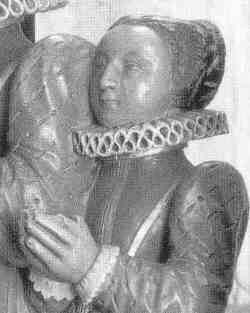
Lady Susan effigy at Westminster Abbey on the tomb of her mother Anne Cecil, Countess of Oxford and grand-mother Mildred Cooke, Baroness Burghley.

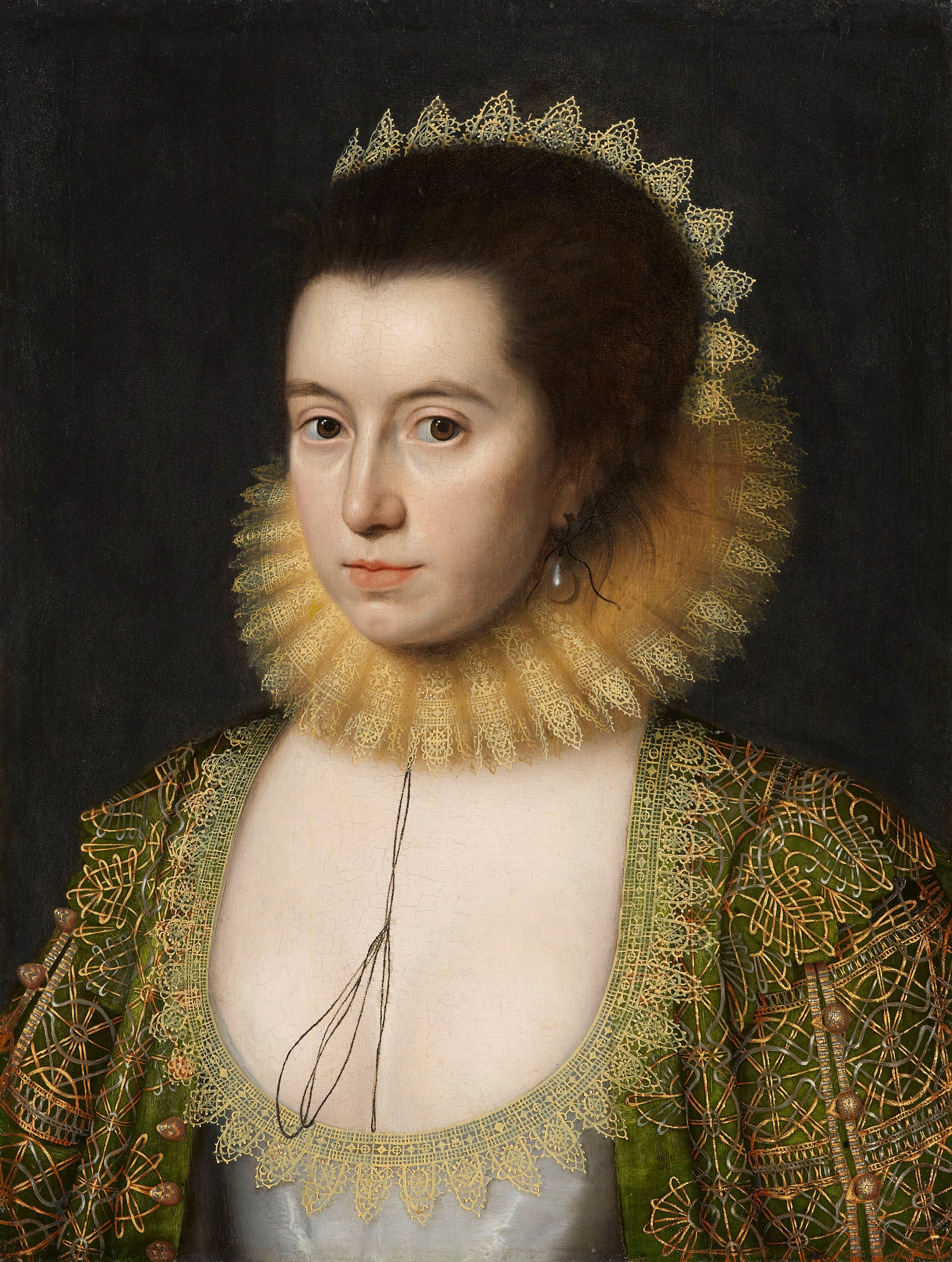
Lady Anne Clifford, portrait by William Larkin, National Portrait Gallery, London

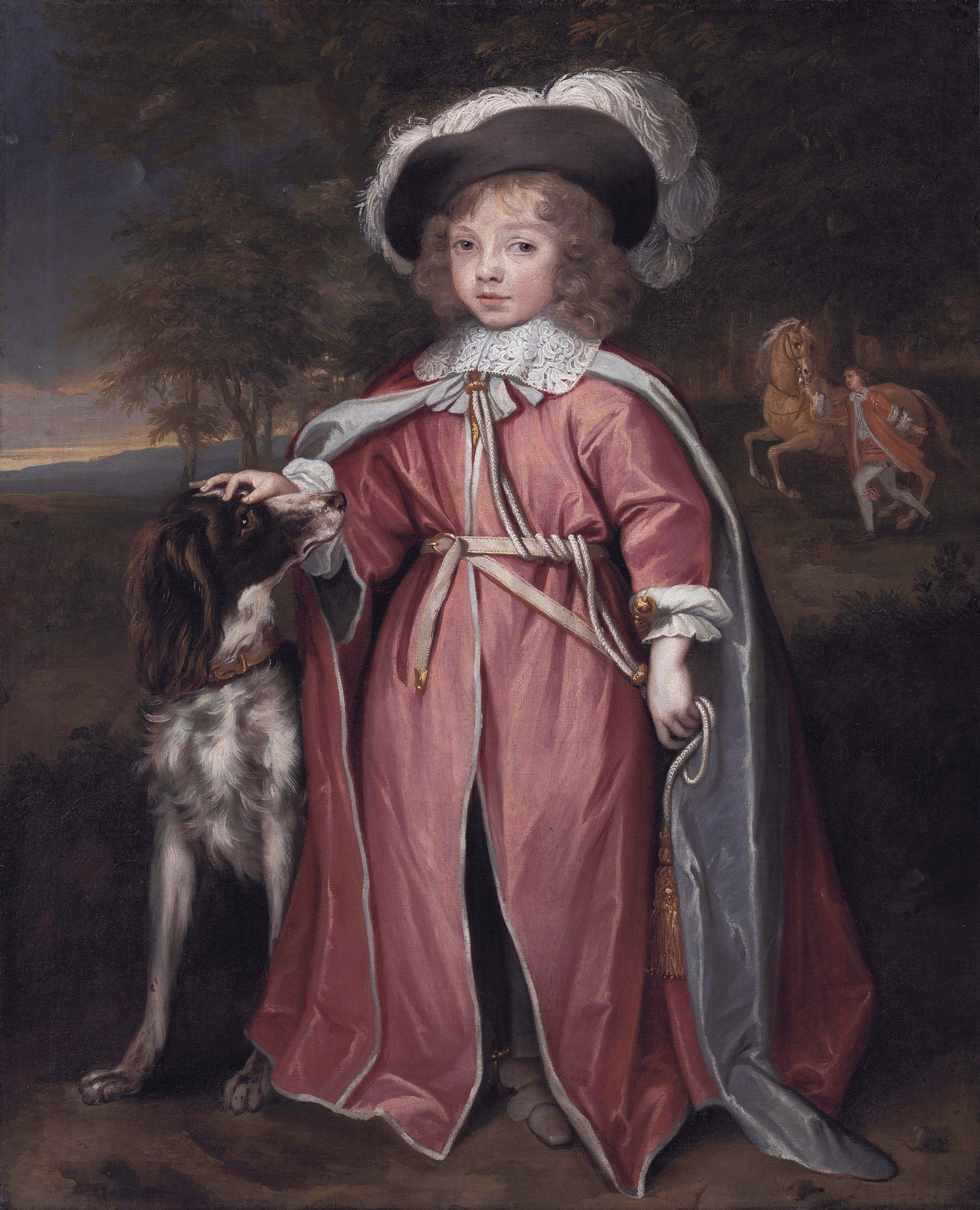
Philip, 7th Earl of Pembroke

Political offices
Preceded by The Duke of Lennox	Lord Lieutenant of Kent; 1624–1646	English Interregnum
Preceded by The Duke of Lennox	Custos Rotulorum of Kent; 1624–1642	Succeeded by The Earl of Leicester
Preceded by The Duke of Buckingham	Lord Lieutenant of Buckinghamshire; 1628–1641	Succeeded by The Baron Paget (Parliamentarian); The Earl of Carnarvon (Royalist)
Preceded by The Earl of Pembroke	Lord Lieutenant of Somerset; 1630–1639	Succeeded by The Marquess of Hertford
Preceded by The Earl of Pembroke	Custos Rotulorum of Cornwall; 1630–1642	Succeeded by The Earl of Radnor and The Earl of Bath
Preceded by The Earl of Pembroke	Custos Rotulorum of Pembrokeshire; 1630–1643	Succeeded by The Earl of Carbery
Preceded by The Earl of Pembroke	Custos Rotulorum of Monmouthshire; 1630–1645	Succeeded by Sir Nicholas Kemeys, Bt
Preceded by The Earl of Pembroke	Custos Rotulorum of Glamorgan; 1630–1645	Succeeded by Sir John Aubrey, Bt
Preceded by The Earl of Pembroke	Lord Lieutenant of Cornwall and Wiltshire; 1630–1646	English Interregnum
Preceded by The Lord Powis	Custos Rotulorum of Montgomeryshire; 1641–1643	Succeeded by Herbert Vaughan
Preceded by The Earl of Pembroke	Lord Chamberlain; 1625–1641	Succeeded by The Earl of Essex
Preceded by The Earl of Pembroke	Lord Warden of the Stannaries; 1630–1642	English Interregnum
Academic offices
Preceded by William Laud	Chancellor of the University of Oxford; 1641–1643	Succeeded by Duke of Somerset
Preceded by Duke of Somerset	Chancellor of the University of Oxford; 1648–1649	Succeeded by Oliver Cromwell
Peerage of England
Preceded by William Herbert	Earl of Pembroke; 1630–1649	Succeeded by Philip Herbert
New creation	Earl of Montgomery; 1605–1649	Succeeded by Philip Herbert
