= Thomas Perrot =

Member of the Parliament of England

Sir Thomas Perrot
- Born: 1553; Haroldston, Haverforwest
- Died: 1594 (aged 40–41)
- Spouse: Dorothy Devereux
- Issue: Unnamed son Penelope Perrot
- Father: Sir John Perrot
- Mother: Anne Cheyne

Sir Thomas Perrot (1553 – 1594) was an Elizabethan courtier, soldier, and member of parliament. He campaigned in Ireland and the Low Countries, and was involved in the defence of England against the Spanish Armada. He was imprisoned several times, on one occasion to prevent a duel with Sir Walter Raleigh, and on another occasion because of his secret marriage to Dorothy Devereux, a Lady-in-waiting to the Queen, and sister of the Queen's favourite, the Earl of Essex. Perrot's only daughter, Penelope, married Sir Robert Naunton, author of Fragmenta Regalia, which claimed that Perrot's father, Sir John Perrot, was an illegitimate son of Henry VIII.

== Family ==
Thomas Perrot was the son of Sir John Perrot by his first wife, Anne Cheyne (d.1553), the daughter of Sir Thomas Cheyne, Lord Warden of the Cinque Ports, and his first wife, Frideswide Frowyk (died c.1528), daughter of Sir Thomas Frowyk, Chief Justice of the Common Pleas.

By his father's second marriage to Jane Prust (d.1593), widow of Lewis Pollard (d.1563) of Oakford, Devon, and daughter of Hugh Prust (d.1559) of Thorry, Devonshire, Perrot had a half-brother and two half-sisters:

- William Perrot (d.1587), who died unmarried.
- Anne Perrott, who married Sir John Phillips, 1st Baronet, of Picton Castle.
- Lettice, who married firstly Walter Vaughan of Golden Grove, Carmarthenshire, secondly John Langhorne of St Brides, and thirdly, on 8 April 1605, Arthur Chichester, Lord Deputy of Ireland.

Perrot also had at least four illegitimate siblings, Sir James Perrot, John Perrot (born c.1565), Elizabeth Perrot, and another sister whose name is unknown.

== Career ==
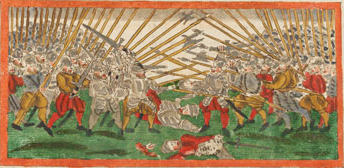
Illustration in Johann Jakob Wick's report of the Battle of Zutphen

Perrot saw his first service as a soldier when he accompanied his father to Ireland in 1579. He was knighted when the English forces landed at Waterford. On his return home he was imprisoned in the Fleet to prevent a duel with Sir Walter Raleigh. In 1581 he took part in a tournament in the tiltyard at Whitehall Palace before the Queen and French ambassadors; Perrot and 16 other defenders led by the Earl of Oxford withstood a challenge to the Castle of Beauty by the Earl of Arundel and Sir William Drury.

In 1582, Perrot gave Elizabeth I a New Year's Day gift of a gauntlet embroidered with seed pearls and sparks of diamonds. A comparable jewel was depicted in her "Rainbow portrait". In 1583, Perrot was again imprisoned in the Fleet for his secret marriage to Dorothy Devereux, one of the Queen's ladies in waiting.

Perrot then campaigned in the Low Countries, where he fought at the Battle of Zutphen on 22 September 1586. In the following year Perrot's father, who had been appointed Lord Deputy of Ireland, sought to have Perrot appointed as Master of the Ordnance; however the post went to Sir George Carew, who had the backing of William Cecil, 1st Baron Burghley, and Robert Dudley, Earl of Leicester.

In April 1588 Perrot, George Owen, his fellow Deputy Lieutenant of Pembrokeshire, and other members of the local gentry were occupied with measures to defend Milford Haven against a landing by the Spanish Armada, and in October of that year Perrot reviewed levies from Wales preparing to defend against a possible landing by the remnants of the Armada in Ireland.

At about this time Perrot was also involved in a Chancery suit aimed at overturning the will of Sir Thomas Cheyne, Perrot's maternal grandfather, whose son, Henry Cheyne, had died in 1587 without male issue. The suit was not resolved in Perrot's lifetime, and was reopened by his daughter, Penelope, in 1619.

In 1590 Perrot was removed from the Deputy Lieutenancy of Pembrokeshire, allegedly at the behest of Sir Christopher Hatton, who is said to have been his 'unremitting foe'. In 1591 he was again in prison, although no charges were brought against him. In 1592 his father, Sir John Perrot, was convicted of treason and attainted, and died in the Tower of London, not without suspicion that he had been poisoned. Despite the attainder, Perrot claimed his father's estate, and by an Act of Parliament in March 1593, which was 'rushed through both Houses in four days', Perrot was restored in blood through the efforts of his brother-in-law, Robert Devereux, 2nd Earl of Essex, inheriting Haroldston Mansion and Laugharne Castle together with of the rest of his father's estates with the exception of Carew Castle, which was taken by the Crown.

Perrot was a member of two committees in the 1581 session of the prorogued 1572 Parliament, although the identity of his constituency at the time is uncertain. He sat in the 1586 Parliament as Knight of the Shire for Cardiganshire. In February 1593 he was elected for Pembrokeshire.

Perrot fell ill in early 1594, and made his will on 12 February. As he had no male heir, his property was divided between his wife, Dorothy, and his daughter, Penelope.

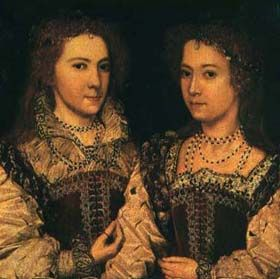
Portrait of Dorothy Devereux (left) and her sister, Penelope Devereux (right)

== Marriage and issue ==
In July 1583, Perrot married Dorothy Devereux (d.1619), daughter of Walter Devereux, 1st Earl of Essex, by whom he is said to have had a son who predeceased him without issue, and a daughter, Penelope. Perrot's daughter, Penelope, married firstly the astronomer Sir William Lower, by whom she had three sons and a daughter. After Lower's death Penelope (née Perrot) married secondly Sir Robert Naunton, by whom she had a daughter Penelope (born 1620), who married firstly Paul Bayning, 2nd Viscount Bayning, and secondly Philip Herbert, 5th Earl of Pembroke. Sir Robert Naunton's Fragmenta Regalia is the source of the claim that Thomas Perrot's father, Sir John Perrot, was an illegitimate son of Henry VIII.

After Perrot's death in 1594, his widow, Dorothy, married Henry Percy, 9th Earl of Northumberland.
