= William Herbert, 6th Earl of Pembroke =

English peer & politician (1641-1674)

The Right Honourable The Earl of Pembroke
- Born: c. 1641
- Died: 8 July 1674 (aged 32–33)
- Title: 6th Earl of Pembroke
- Predecessor: Philip Herbert, 5th Earl of Pembroke
- Successor: Philip Herbert, 7th Earl of Pembroke
- Parent(s): Philip Herbert, 5th Earl of Pembroke; Penelope Naunton
- Relatives: Robert Naunton (maternal grandfather); Philip Herbert, 7th Earl of Pembroke (brother)

William Herbert, 6th Earl of Pembroke, 3rd Earl of Montgomery (c. 1641 – 8 July 1674) was an English nobleman and politician who succeeded to the titles on 11 December 1669 on the death of his father.

Brought up in Wiltshire at Wilton House, he was the son of Philip Herbert, 5th Earl of Pembroke, by his marriage to Penelope Naunton, the daughter of Sir Robert Naunton, Secretary of State to King James I and of Penelope Perrot, a daughter of Sir Thomas Perrot and of Lady Dorothy Devereux (later Countess of Northumberland), whose parents were the famous Earl of Essex and Lettice Knollys.

His mother died before 1647, when he was a small child.

In September 1658, he was granted a pass to travel overseas. He was member of parliament for Glamorgan between 1661 and his elevation to the House of Lords in 1669. After he came into his father's great estates, especially in Wiltshire and in Wales, Pembroke was known to exercise a decisive electoral influence in many places. However, with the Cavalier Parliament enduring from 1661 until 1679, he had few opportunities to wield this influence directly in elections to the House of Commons. From 1665 to 1674, he was Custos Rotulorum of Wiltshire.

Pembroke died unmarried on 8 July 1674 and was succeeded by his brother, Philip Herbert, 7th Earl of Pembroke, who became known as "the infamous Earl", due to his frequent bouts of homicidal mania.

Parliament of England
Preceded by Sir Edward Mansel	Member of Parliament for Glamorganshire; 1661–1669	Succeeded by Sir Edward Mansel
Honorary titles
Preceded by The Lord Seymour of Trowbridge	Custos Rotulorum of Wiltshire; 1665–1674	Succeeded by The Duke of Somerset
Peerage of England
Preceded by Philip Herbert	Earl of Pembroke; Earl of Montgomery; 1669–1674	Succeeded by Philip Herbert
