= Wilton by-election =

Wilton by-election may refer to one of several parliamentary by-elections held for the British House of Commons constituency of Wilton in Wiltshire:

- 1841 Wilton by-election
- 1855 Wilton by-election
- 1877 Wilton by-election
- 1900 Wilton by-election
- 1918 Wilton by-election

== See also ==
- Wilton (UK Parliament constituency)
