= William Pleydell-Bouverie =

William Pleydell-Bouverie may refer to:

- William Pleydell-Bouverie, 3rd Earl of Radnor, British peer
- William Pleydell-Bouverie, 5th Earl of Radnor, British politician
- William Pleydell-Bouverie, 7th Earl of Radnor, British peer
