= Jacob Pleydell-Bouverie =

Jacob Pleydell-Bouverie may refer to:

- Jacob Pleydell-Bouverie, 2nd Earl of Radnor (1750–1828), Lord Lieutenant of Berkshire
- Jacob Pleydell-Bouverie, 4th Earl of Radnor (1815–1889), Lord Lieutenant of Wiltshire
- Jacob Pleydell-Bouverie, 6th Earl of Radnor (1868–1930), Lord Lieutenant of Wiltshire
- Jacob Pleydell-Bouverie, 8th Earl of Radnor (1927–2008), earl in the Peerage of Great Britain

== See also ==
- Jacob Bouverie (disambiguation)
