= Frederick Hervey-Bathurst =

Frederick Hervey-Bathurst may refer to:

- Sir Frederick Hervey-Bathurst, 4th Baronet (1833–1900), English cricketer and politician
- Sir Frederick Hervey-Bathurst, 3rd Baronet (1807–1881), English cricketer
