= Clarendon Park, Wiltshire =

Estate in Alderbury, Wiltshire, England

Coordinates: 51.0555°N 1.7227°W

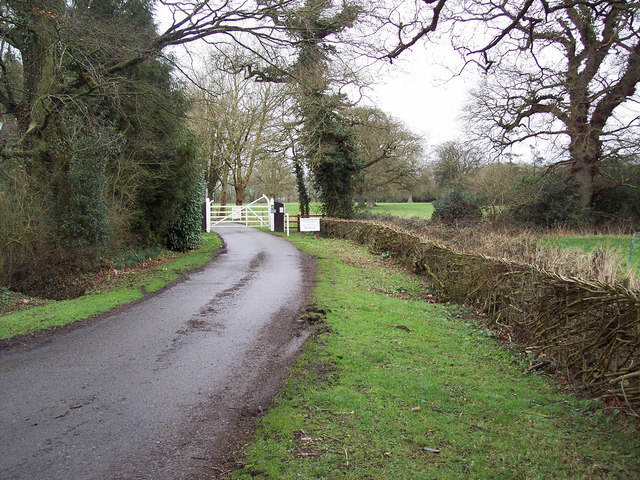
Entrance gate to Clarendon Park

Clarendon Park is a Grade I listed building, estate and civil parish located a short distance east of the city of Salisbury in Wiltshire, England. According to the 2011 census the population of the parish was 246.

The parish is almost entirely farmland, with parkland and gardens around the 18th-century house. In the southwest the parish extends to the Petersfinger area on the western outskirts of Salisbury, and the west bank of the Salisbury Avon. The Clarendon Way recreational footpath passes through the parish.

== History ==
Part or all of Clarendon Forest was once known as Penchet. This name derives from Common Brittonic, from the words found today in modern Welsh as pen ("head, end, summit") and coed ("woodland"). Thus the name once meant "end of the wood".

Clarendon Forest housed a royal hunting lodge in the 12th century, which was expanded into a royal palace in the 13th. In the 16th century the buildings reverted to a hunting lodge and were then abandoned. Today only foundations and part of one wall survive.

== House ==
The mansion known as Clarendon House or Clarendon Park is 1.3 miles (2.1 km) south-east of the site of the palace. It was completed in 1737 for Peter Bathurst, MP for Salisbury, a member of the wealthy Bathurst slave-trading family, and remodelled internally in 1814 and 1920. After having been passed down the Hervey-Bathurst family, it was occupied by Sir Frederick Hervey-Bathurst, 3rd Baronet, from 1824 to 1881, and then by his son Sir Frederick Hervey-Bathurst, 4th Baronet, until 1900. Around 1920, Sir Frederick Hervey-Bathurst, 5th Baronet, sold it to a Christie-Miller. Around 1979, 19th-century service additions on the west side were demolished. The estate was bought by Marc Jonas and his wife in 2006.

The house was designated as Grade I listed in 1960.
