= John Hawles =

English politician (1645–1716)

Sir John Hawles

Member of Parliament in Britain
- In office March 1689 – 1690
- Constituency: Old Sarum (1689-1690) Wilton (1690 - March 4, 1701) Truro (March 5, 1701 - December 1701) Wilton (1702-1705) Stockbridge (1706-1710)

Personal details
- Born: 1645 Salisbury, Wiltshire
- Died: 1716 (aged 70–71)
- Education: Winchester College

Sir John Hawles (1645–1716), of Lincoln's Inn, was an English lawyer and Whig politician who sat in the English and British House of Commons between 1689 and 1710.

== Early life ==
Hawles was born in the Close at Salisbury, the second son of Thomas Hawles of Moanton in Wiltshire, and his wife Elizabeth Antrobus of Hampshire, daughter of Thomas Antrobus of Heath House, Petersfield, Hampshire. His father, whose name is sometimes spelled Hollis, belonged to the family of Hawles of Upwimborne, Dorset. During the First English Civil War he was leader of the band known as the club men in Salisbury, who took the side of the parliament.

John Hawles was educated at Winchester College, and matriculated at Queen's College, Oxford in 1662. He was admitted at Lincoln's Inn on 10 February 1664, and was called to the bar in 1670.

== Career ==
At the 1689 English general election, the return for Old Sarum was declared void, and Hawles was returned as Member of Parliament for Old Sarum at the re-election there on 25 March 1689. At the 1690 English general election, he stood for Parliament at St Ives and Banbury but was unsuccessful at both. In October 1691, he lost out for the recordership of London against with Sir Bartholomew Showers. On 1 July 1695 Hawles was appointed solicitor-general in succession to Sir Thomas Trevor. At the 1695 English general election, he was returned unopposed as MP for Wilton and was chairman of the committee of privileges and elections from 1695 to January 1696. He was knighted on 28 November 1695.

At the 1698 English general election, Hawles was returned in a contest for Mitchell, and unopposed for Bere Alston but held both seats throughout the Parliament as there were petitions against both returns. He was returned as MP for Truro at a by-election on 4 March 1701, and at the second general election of 1701 was returned in a contest as MP for St Ives. At the 1702 English general election he was returned in a contest as MP for Wilton again, but lost his place as solicitor-general. He was returned in a contest as Whig MP for Stockbridge at the 1705 English general election and voted for the Court candidate as Speaker on 25 October 1705. At the 1708 British general election, he was returned unopposed as a Whig for Stockbridge. He was passed over for office and may have expressed his resentment by speaking against the Court on the treasons trial bill on 5 April 1709. Nevertheless, he was appointed as one of the managers of the impeachment of Henry Sacheverell in 1710 but offended his fellow Whigs by giving way on several points. He took no further part in the trial but voted for Sacheverell's impeachment. He was not returned to Parliament at the 1710 British general election, or subsequently.

== Later life and legacy ==
Hawles resided for some years on the family estate at Upwimborne, and died unmarried on 2 August 1716. He left all his property to John Johnson of Lincoln's Inn, who may have been an illegitimate son.

Parliament of England
Preceded by John Young; Thomas Pitt	Member of Parliament for Old Sarum; 1689–1690; With: William Harvey	Succeeded by William Harvey; Sir Thomas Mompesson
Preceded by Sir Richard Howe; Thomas Wyndham	Member of Parliament for Wilton; 1695–1698; With: John Gauntlett	Succeeded by John Gauntlett; Sir Henry Ashurst
Preceded by John Tregagle; John Povey	Member of Parliament for Mitchell; 1698–1701; With: John Povey	Succeeded by William Beaw; Anthony Rowe
Preceded by John Elwill; Sir Rowland Gwynne	Member of Parliament for Bere Alston; 1698–1701; With: Sir Rowland Gwynne 1698; James Montagu 1698–1701	Succeeded by Sir Rowland Gwynne; Sir Peter King
Preceded by Henry Vincent; Hugh Fortescue	Member of Parliament for Truro; 1701; With: Henry Vincent	Succeeded by Henry Vincent; Sir William Scawen
Preceded by James Praed; Benjamin Overton	Member of Parliament for St Ives; 1701–1702; With: James Praed	Succeeded by James Praed; Richard Chaundler
Preceded by John Gauntlett; Sir Henry Ashurst	Member of Parliament for Wilton; 1702–1705; With: George Boddington 1702; John Gauntlett 1702–1705	Succeeded by John Gauntlett; William Nicholas
Preceded by Anthony Burnaby; Henry Killigrew	Member of Parliament for Stockbridge; 1705–1707; With: Sir Edward Lawrence	Succeeded by Parliament of Great Britain
Parliament of Great Britain
Preceded by Parliament of England	Member of Parliament for Stockbridge; 1707–1710; With: Sir Edward Lawrence	Succeeded by George Dashwood; The Earl of Barrymore
Legal offices
Preceded by Sir Thomas Trevor	Solicitor General; 1695–1702	Succeeded by Sir Simon Harcourt
