= Bodenham (disambiguation) =

Bodenham is a village in Herefordshire, England.

Bodenham may also refer to:

- Bodenham, Wiltshire, a hamlet near Nunton, England
- Bodenham Arboretum in Wolverley, Worcestershire
- Cecily Bodenham (died after 1543), last Abbess of Wilton Abbey
- Francis Bodenham (c.1582–1645), English politician
- Henry Bodenham (1511/12–1573), English politician
- John Bodenham (c.1559–1610), English anthologist
- Martin Bodenham (born 1950), English football referee and cricket umpire
- HMS Bodenham (M2609), Royal Navy minesweeper
