= Moleyns =

Moleyns may refer to:

- Adam Moleyns (died 1450), English bishop, lawyer, royal administrator and diplomat
- Baron Moleyns, a title in the Peerage of England created in 1455 and merged with Baron Hungerford
- Thomas Moleyns, Member of Parliament
- William Moleyns (1378–1425), English politician, member of the Parliament of England
