= Lionel Hervey-Bathurst =

English cricketer

Personal information
- Born: 7 July 1849; Clarendon Park, Wiltshire, England
- Died: 4 May 1908 (aged 58); Hemel Hempstead, Hertfordshire, England
- Role: Wicket-keeper
- Relatives: Sir Frederick Hervey-Bathurst (father); Sir Frederick Hervey-Bathurst (half-brother)

Domestic team information
- Years: Team
- 1875: Hampshire

Career statistics
Competition	First-class
Matches	2
Runs scored	30
Batting average	7.50
100s/50s	0/0
Top score	14
Balls bowled	16
Wickets	0
Bowling average	–
5 wickets in innings	–
10 wickets in match	–
Best bowling	–
Catches/stumpings	1/1
- Source: Cricinfo, 10 December 2009

Lionel Hervey-Bathurst JP (7 July 1849 — 4 May 1908) was an English first-class cricketer and British Army officer.

The son of the cricketer Sir Frederick Hervey-Bathurst, 3rd Baronet and his second wife, Clare Emily Brooke, he was born in July 1849 at Clarendon Park, Wiltshire. Hervey-Bathurst purchased a commission as an ensign into the Rifle Brigade in October 1868, with promotion without purchase to lieutenant following in November 1871. In 1875, he made two appearances in first-class for Hampshire County Cricket Club, both against Kent at Catford and Winchester. He scored 30 runs in his two matches, with a highest score of 14. As a wicket-keeper, he took a catch and a stumping apiece. In the Rifle Brigade, he was promoted to captain in April 1879, with promotion to major following in September 1884.

In 1905, Hervey-Bathurst inherited Gadebridge House from his father-in-law, Sir Astley Paston Paston-Cooper, 3rd Baronet. Following his inheritance, he became known as Lionel Paston-Cooper by royal licence from October 1905. In later life, he was a justice of the peace. Hervey-Bathurst died at Hemel Hempstead in May 1908, from complications following an operation for appendicitis. His half brother, Sir Frederick Hervey-Bathurst, 4th Baronet, was also a first-class cricketer.
