= Molyn =

Molyn may refer to:

- Thomas Molyn
- Pieter Molyn
- Molyn (Metal Master)
