= Charles Herbert (Royal Navy officer, born 1743) =

British politician and Royal Navy officer

Captain Charles Herbert MP
- Monarch: George III

Member of Parliament for Wilton
- In office 1807–1816

Member of Parliament for Wilton
- In office February 1775 – 1780

Groom of the Chamber
- In office 1777–1816

Personal details
- Born: 28 May 1743
- Died: 5 September 1816 (aged 73) Heath, near Wakefield
- Spouse: Lady Caroline Montagu (1745-1818)
- Relations: Henry Herbert, 10th Earl of Pembroke (cousin); Earl of Carnarvon (brother)
- Parent(s): William Herbert (1696-1757); Catherine Elizabeth Tewes (died 1770)
- Occupation: Politician, courtier and naval officer

Military service
- Allegiance: Great Britain
- Branch/service: Royal Navy
- Years of service: 1761 to 1774
- Rank: Captain

Charles Herbert (28 May 1743 – 5 September 1816) was a Royal Navy officer and British politician who sat in the House of Commons as Member of Parliament for Wilton from 1775 to 1780, then 1807 to 1816.

Herbert was the second son of army general William Herbert and his wife Catherine Elizabeth Tewes of Aix-la-Chapelle and was baptized on 28 May 1743. His elder brother was Henry Herbert, 1st Earl of Carnarvon.

He was probably educated at Eton College from 1753 to 1754 and subsequently joined the Royal Navy becoming lieutenant in 1761, commander in 1765 and captain in 1768. In July 1775, he married Lady Caroline Montagu (1745-1818), daughter of Robert Montagu, 3rd Duke of Manchester;the couple had no children.

Herbert was returned as Member of Parliament for Wilton, previously held by his father from 1734 to 1757; he was selected to stand for the constituency at a bye-election on 20 February 1775 by his cousin, Henry Herbert, 10th Earl of Pembroke, who controlled the seat. From 1775 to 1780, he supported the administration of Lord North, before stepping down in 1780.

In 1777, he was appointed a Groom of the Bedchamber, a post he kept until his death, and was secretary to the Lord Chamberlain from 1782 to 1783. In the 1807 general election, George Herbert, 11th Earl of Pembroke selected him as MP for Wilton in place of his nephew and namesake, who was acting with the opposition. On 7 March 1808 he unsuccessfully applied to the King to become Master of the Robes. He was re-elected MP for Wilton in 1812.

He died on 5 September 1816.

== Sources ==
- Spencer, Gervase. "Portrait miniature of the Rt. Hon. Lady Caroline Montagu(e) (1745-1818)". Historical Portraits.
- Namier, Lewis; Brooke, John (1964). HERBERT, Charles (1743-1816), of Heath, nr. Wakefield, Yorks in The History of Parliament: the House of Commons 1754-1790. Boydell Brewer.
- Thorne, R.G (1986). HERBERT, Charles (1743-1816), of Heath, nr. Wakefield, Yorks in The History of Parliament: the House of Commons 1790-1820. Boydell Brewer.

Parliament of Great Britain
Preceded by Henry Herbert; Hon. Nicholas Herbert	Member of Parliament for Wilton; With: Henry Herbert	Succeeded by Lord Herbert; William Gerard Hamilton
Preceded by Ralph Sheldon; Captain the Hon. Charles Herbert	Member of Parliament for Wilton; 1807–1816; With: Ralph Sheldon	Succeeded by Ralph Sheldon; Viscount FitzHarris
