= Tudway =

Tudway is a surname. Notable people with the surname include:

- Clement Tudway (1734–1815), British lawyer and politician
- Hervey Tudway (1888–1914), English cricketer
- Robert Tudway (1808–1855), British politician
- Thomas Tudway (died 1726), English musician and composer
