= Jacob Pleydell-Bouverie, 8th Earl of Radnor =

British Earl

- Born: 10 November 1927
- Died: 10 August 2008 (aged 80); Wiltshire, England
- Spouse(s): Anne Seth-Smith (m. 1953; div. 1962) Margaret Fleming (m. 1963; div. 1985) Mary Eddy (m. 1986)
- Children: 6
- Father: William Pleydell-Bouverie

Jacob Pleydell-Bouverie, 8th Earl of Radnor (10 November 1927 – 10 August 2008) was a British nobleman. He was the son of William Pleydell-Bouverie, 7th Earl of Radnor and Helena Olivia Adeane.

== Biography ==
He married, first, Anne Garden Seth-Smith, daughter of Donald Farquaharson Seth-Smith, on 8 July 1953 and they were divorced in 1962. He and Anne had two sons:

- William Pleydell-Bouverie, 9th Earl of Radnor (b. 5 January 1955)
- Hon. Peter John Pleydell-Bouverie DL (b. 14 January 1958), married Hon. Jane Victoria Gilmour (b. 1959), daughter of Ian Gilmour, Baron Gilmour of Craigmillar, in 1986 and had issue.

He married, secondly, Margaret Robin Fleming, daughter of Robin Fleming, in 1963 and they were divorced in 1985. They had four daughters:

- Lady Martha Pleydell-Bouverie (b. 1964)
- Lady Lucy Pleydell-Bouverie (b. 1964)
- Lady Belinda Pleydell-Bouverie (b. 1966), married in 2006 Anthony Paget (1946-2007)
- Lady Frances Pleydell-Bouverie (b. 1973)

He married, thirdly, Mary Jillean Gwenellan Eddy, daughter of William Edward Montague Eddy, in 1986. He died at Longford Castle in 2008.

From 1971 to 2008 he served as Governor of the French Hospital in Rochester, Kent. Successive Earls of Radnor were governors of the hospital from the eighteenth century to 2015.

== Coat of arms ==
Coat of arms of Jacob Pleydell-Bouverie, 8th Earl of Radnor
Coronet A coronet of an Earl Crest A demi-eagle with two heads displayed sable, ducally gorged or, and charged on the breast with a cross crosslet argent. Escutcheon Quarterly: 1st and 4th, per fesse or and argent, an eagle displayed, with two heads sable, on the breast an escutcheon gules, charged with a bend vair (Bouverie); 2nd and 3rd, argent a bend gules, guttée d’eau between two ravens sable, a chief checky, or and sable (Pleydell). Supporters Two eagles reguardant, wings elevated sable, ducally gorged or, each charged on the breast with a cross crosslet argent. Motto Patria cara carior libertas. (My country is dear, liberty is dearer.)

== Ancestry ==
Ancestors of Jacob Pleydell-Bouverie, 8th Earl of Radnor

8. William Pleydell-Bouverie, 5th Earl of Radnor
4. Jacob Pleydell-Bouverie, 6th Earl of Radnor
9. Helen Chaplin
2. William Pleydell-Bouverie, 7th Earl of Radnor
10. Charles Balfour
5. Julian Balfour
11. Minnie Liddell
1. Jacob Pleydell-Bouverie, 8th Earl of Radnor
12. Henry Adeane
6. Charles Adeane
13. Lady Elizabeth Yorke
3. Helena Adeane
14. The Hon. Percy Wyndham
7. Madeline Wyndham
15. Madeline Campbell

Peerage of Great Britain
Preceded by William Pleydell-Bouverie	Earl of Radnor; 1968–2008	Succeeded by William Pleydell-Bouverie
