= John Hulle (MP for Wilton) =

Member of the Parliament of England

John Hulle (died after 1403) was an English member of parliament.

He was a member (MP) of the parliament of England for Wilton in September 1388.
