= Thomas Highgate (MP) =

16th-century English politician

Thomas Highgate (by 1533 – 15 August 1576), of Hayes, Middlesex was an English member of parliament.

== Family ==
His wife's name is unrecorded, and she presumably predeceased him. He left a son named William, and a daughter, Anne, who married the MP, Henry Duport.

== Career ==
He was a Member of the Parliament of England for Devizes in April 1554 and Wilton in 1559, 1563 and 1571.
