= Mayor of Wilton =

List of mayors of Wilton, Wiltshire, England:

- 1391–2: William Chitterne
