= Westbrook Hay =

Heritage building in England

Westbrook Hay School
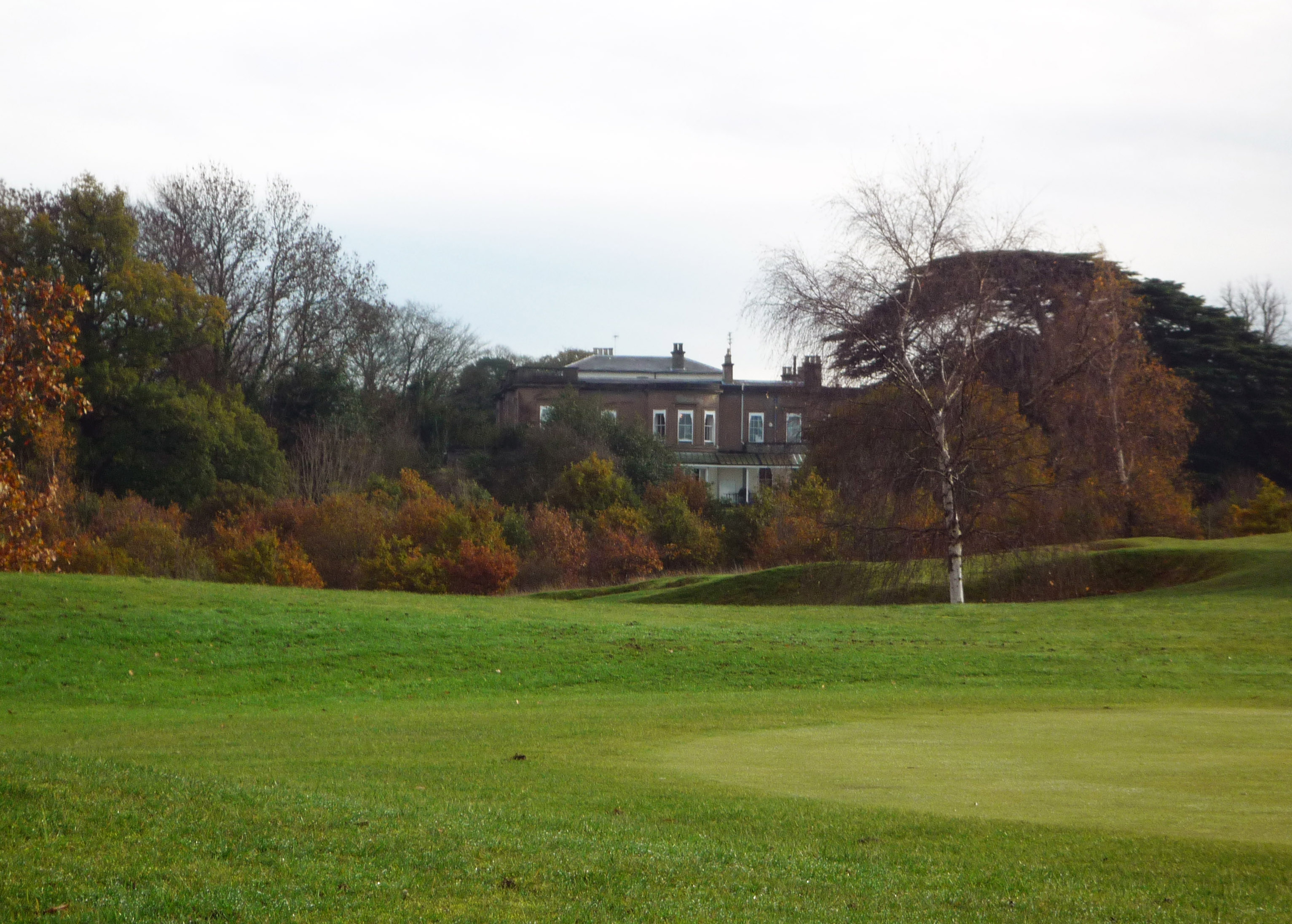
- Westbrook Hay School seen from the golf course

Location
- Hemel Hempstead, Hertfordshire, HP1 2RF; England; 51.7388°N 0.5158°W

Information
- Type: Independent school
- Religious affiliation: Anglican Church of England
- Established: 1892
- Campus size: 26 acres (11 ha)

Westbrook Hay School is a culturally significant great house located in Hemel Hempstead, Hertfordshire, England, that has housed the independent Westbrook Hay Prep School since 1963.

== Listed building ==
Westbrook Hay was built in the 17th century and remained in the ownership of the Ryder family (Richard Ryder, then Granville Ryder and then Dudley Ryder) until the Second World War, after which it became the headquarters of the Hemel Hempstead New Town Development corporation.

A Grade II listed building on the National Heritage List for England, Westbrook Hay School is in a rural location on 26 acres of parkland overlooking the Bourne valley, off the A41 between Berkhamsted and Hemel Hempstead in Hertfordshire.

During the 1950s, the 590 m (650 yd) drive became the Westbrook Hay Hill Climb. The building began housing a school in 1963, and it was listed on the National Heritage List in 1966 as "Westbrook Hay School".

== Prep school ==
Westbrook Hay Prep School is a co-educational independent school for children from rising 3–16 years. Augustus Orlebar, a former housemaster at Radley College, established the school in 1892 in Bedford as a boarding school for boys. It moved to Hinwick House near Wellingborough shortly thereafter, when it was named "Hinwick House School", and then to Gadebridge House in Hemel Hempstead in 1914. The school remained there until the Commission for New Towns forced it out of those premises as part of the development of the new town in 1963. That year the school moved to Westbrook Hay and took its present name.

=== Alumni ===
- Deji Olatunji – English entertainer
- Alex Hales – English cricketer
- Raef Bjayou – British entrepreneur and television presenter
- Luke O'Nien – English professional footballer
