= James Morrison (British politician) =

British politician

Major James Archibald Morrison DSO (18 September 1873 – 27 October 1934) was a British Conservative Party politician.

Morrison was the son of Alfred Morrison, of Fonthill House, and the grandson of James Morrison. Hugh Morrison was his elder brother and Lord Margadale his nephew.

A rower and expert shot, Morrison became a second lieutenant in the 4th (Eton Volunteer) Battalion, Oxfordshire Light Infantry on 12 December 1891, and transferred to the 4th Middlesex Volunteer Rifle Corps on 15 May 1895. He transferred to the Grenadier Guards on 5 February 1895, and subsequently fought in the Second Boer War.

He was elected as Member of Parliament (MP) for the Wilton division of Wiltshire at an unopposed by-election in July 1900. He was re-elected at the 1900 general election, but at the 1906 election he lost his seat to the Liberal Party candidate. In 1910, he inherited Basildon Park from his uncle Charles (son of James Morrison), and was elected MP for Nottingham East. He resigned the seat in 1912 by the procedural device of accepting the post of Steward of the Manor of Northstead. In 1912 he was named as the co-respondent in a divorce case between Helena Woodley Morand and her husband, the actor M. R. Morand. Both Helena Morand and Morrison denied adultery but the case was found proved and M. R. Morand was awarded £5,500 in agreed damages against Captain Morrison.

Morrison made major improvements to the Basildon estate, building new cottages and pumping stations to supply it with water. When the First World War broke out, he returned to the Grenadier Guards. Harold Macmillan served as a lieutenant under his command. Badly wounded at the Battle of the Somme, he was invalided out of the Army and turned over Basildon Park for use as a Guards' convalescent home. He was awarded the DSO in 1916.

Morrison sold off the Basildon estate to Sir Edward Iliffe in 1929 and died in 1934.

Parliament of the United Kingdom
Preceded by Viscount Folkestone	Member of Parliament for Wilton; 1900 – 1906	Succeeded by Levi Lapper Morse
Preceded by Sir Henry Cotton	Member of Parliament for Nottingham East; January 1910 – 1912	Succeeded by Sir John Rees
