= John Benett =

English politician

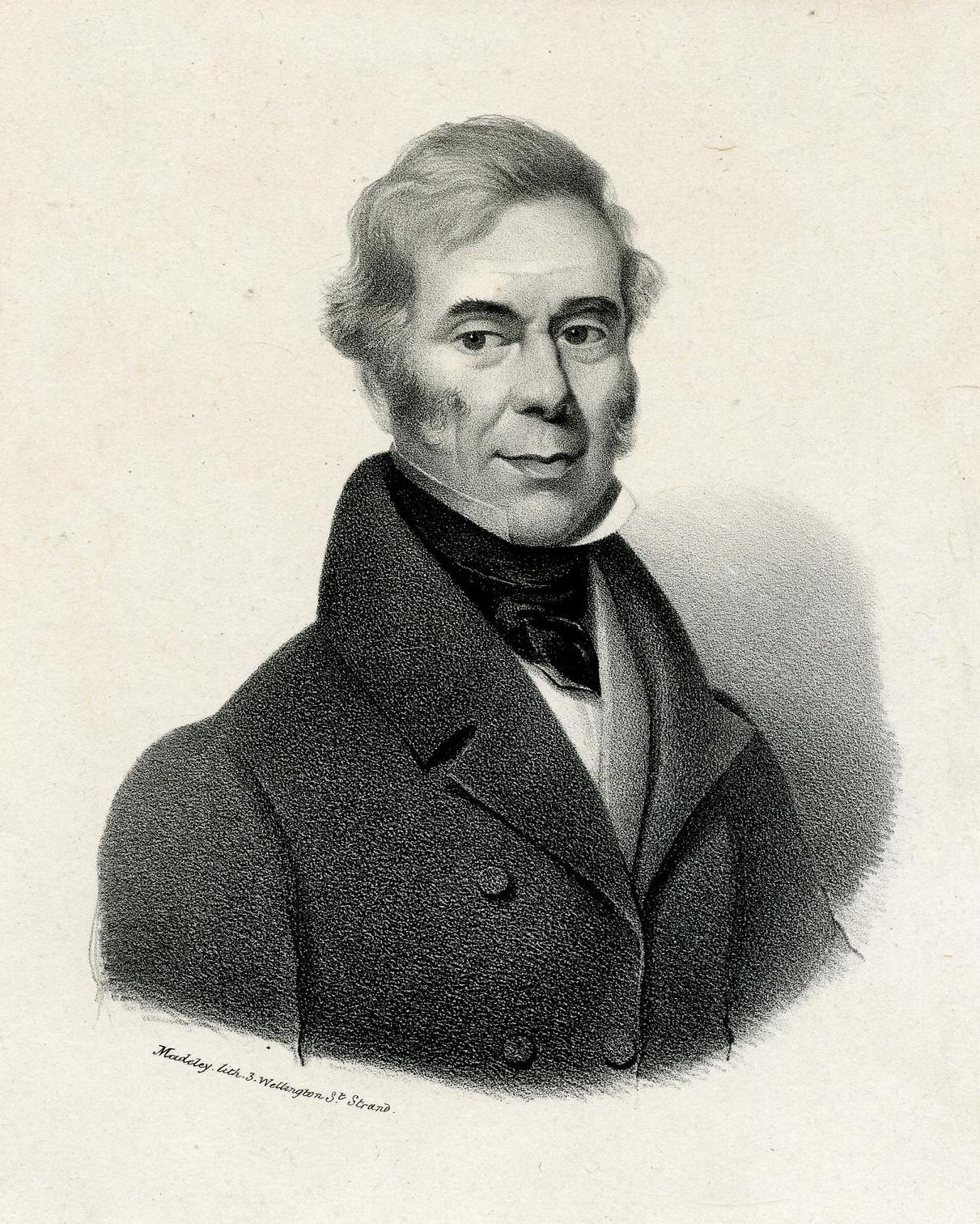
John Benett

John Benett (1773–1852), of Pythouse, Wiltshire, was an English politician.

He was a Member (MP) of the Parliament of the United Kingdom for Wiltshire 1819 to 1832 and for South Wiltshire from 1832 to 1852.

== Biography ==
Benett was born on 20 May 1773 in Wiltshire. He was the son of Thomas Benett (1729–1797) of Pythouse in West Tisbury, and his second wife Catherine Darell (d.1790), daughter of James Darell. His maternal grandfather was William Wake DD, Archbishop of Canterbury. His sister was the geologist Etheldred Benett.

He commissioned the rebuilding of Pythouse, completed in 1805.

He married in 1801 Lucy, daughter of Edmund Lambert of Boyton Manor, also in Wiltshire. They had two sons and five daughters, among them:

- Etheldred, married in 1827 Lord Charles Spencer-Churchill, second son of the 5th Duke of Marlborough
- Lucy, married Rev. Arthur Fane, younger son of General Sir Henry Fane; Arthur was later vicar of Warminster.
