= Bathurst baronets =

Extinct baronetcy in the Baronetage of England

The Bathurst Baronetcy, of Lechlade in the County of Gloucester and of Farrington in the County of Oxford, was a title in the Baronetage of England. It was created on 15 December 1643 for Edward Bathurst, the second son of Robert Bathurst (1563-1623) and his second wife Elizabeth (b. about 1613), daughter and heir of Ralph Waller and widow of Sir John Laurence, kt., of St. Ives (Hunts). He was a descendant of Thomas Bathurst (15th century), whose brother Edward Bathurst was the ancestor of the Earls Bathurst.

Toward the end of his life, the first Baronet devised his estate to his eldest son Lawrence Bathurst (1631-71) in return for an annuity, but Lawrence unexpectedly predeceased his father, leaving an infant son and three daughters. Lawrence made his widow Susanna (1637-87) executor of the estate, in trust for his son, and if his son should die, for his daughters as co-heirs. The son, Sir Edward Bathurst (1665-76) inherited the baronetcy but died young, and Lawrence's will therefore operated to separate the title from the estate, with the baronetcy passing to his son's heir male, Lawrence's younger brother, Sir Edward Bathurst (1635-88), and the Lechlade estate to his daughters as co-heirs.

The title became dormant on the death of the seventh Baronet in circa 1780.

== Bathurst baronets, of Lechlade and Farrington (1643) ==
- Sir Edward Bathurst, 1st Baronet (1614–1674)
  - Laurence Bathurst, 2nd Baronet (died 15 September 1671), eldest son of the 1st Baronet
- Sir Edward Bathurst, 3rd Baronet (c. 1665–1677), only son of the 2nd Baronet
- Sir Edward Bathurst, 4th Baronet (c. 1635 – c. 1688), second son of the 1st Baronet
- Sir Edward Bathurst, 5th Baronet (c. 1672 – c. 1690), eldest son of the 4th Baronet
- Sir Francis Bathurst, 6th Baronet (c. 1676 – c. 1738), second son of the 4th Baronet
- Sir Laurence Bathurst, 7th Baronet (died c. 1780), eldest surviving son of the 6th Baronet

== See also ==
- Earl Bathurst
- Viscount Bledisloe
- Hervey-Bathurst baronets
