= Helen Radnor =

Helen Matilda Chaplin Pleydell-Bouverie Radnor, Countess of Radnor, Viscountess Folkestone (21 March 1846 - 11 September 1929) was a British composer, conductor, and singer who helped found the Royal College of Music in London. She formed and conducted an all-female string orchestra and chorus, and was generally known as Lady Helen Radnor.

Radnor was born in Ryhall, England, to Caroline Horatia Ellice and the Reverend Henry Chaplin. Her older brother (born in 1840) was Henry Chaplin, 1st Viscount Chaplin. In June 1866 she married William Pleydell-Bouverie 5th Earl of Radnor. They had two sons and two daughters. One of their sons was Jacob Pleydell-Bouverie, 6th Earl of Radnor.

Little is known about Radnor’s education other than her vocal studies with Pauline Viardot. In 1881, Radnor formed and conducted an all-female string orchestra and chorus. Its first performance was a benefit for the Stafford House, which raised 1,000 pounds. Later that year, the orchestra performed at Henry David Leslie’s Oswestry Festival. The orchestra existed for 15 years, performing annual concerts to benefit various charities in London, Oxford, and elsewhere. Barnum and Bailey invited the group to perform in America. Ultimately, it consisted of 80 string players and 120 vocalists.

Radnor commissioned several works for her orchestra and chorus. The best known of these commissions is Lady Radnor’s Suite by Sir Hubert Parry, who was a personal friend. Radnor conducted the piece’s premiere on June 29, 1894, at St. James Hall. It remains in the string repertoire today.

Radnor was well-connected socially and helped found the Royal College of Music in London. She corresponded with Edward Elgar, George Grove, Charles Halle, George Henschel, Henry David Leslie, August Manns, and Wilma Neruda, among others. Her papers are privately archived and can be accessed through the Wiltshire and Swindon History Centre.

Radnor composed sacred music and edited several orders of service with music, including services for thanksgiving and choral communion. Her works, all vocal, were published by Novello & Co., and include:

- Carol Service
- God of Our Fathers (text by Rudyard Kipling)
- Hymns
- Order of Service for Children
- Psalms
- Songs
