= William Clerke (MP) =

16th-century English politician

William Clerke (by 1527–1587?), of Ponsbourne, Hertfordshire, was an English politician.

He was a member (MP) of the parliament of England for Wilton April 1554, November 1554, 1555, 1558 and 1572, for Calne in 1563 and for Devizes in 1571.
