= William Pleydell-Bouverie, 7th Earl of Radnor =

British Earl

William Pleydell-Bouverie, 7th Earl of Radnor KG, KCVO, DL
- Born: 18 December 1895
- Died: 23 November 1968 (aged 72)
- Education: Trinity College, Cambridge
- Spouse(s): Helene Adeane (m. 1922; div. 1942) Anne Oakley (m. 1943)
- Children: 7, including Jacob
- Father: Jacob Pleydell-Bouverie
- Relatives: William Pleydell-Bouverie (grandfather)

William Pleydell-Bouverie, 7th Earl of Radnor (18 December 1895 – 23 November 1968) was a British peer.

== Biography ==
Radnor was the son of Jacob Pleydell-Bouverie, 6th Earl of Radnor and Julian Eleanor Adelaide Balfour. His education was Harrow School, and later Trinity College, Cambridge.

He married, firstly, Helena Olivia Adeane, daughter of Charles Robert Whorwood Adeane and Madeline Pamela Constance Blanche Wyndham, on 11 October 1922 and had six children. He and Helena were divorced in 1942.

- Lady Jane Pleydell-Bouverie (14 September 1923 – 21 July 2006), married Richard Anthony Bethell in 1945
- Lady Belinda Pleydell-Bouverie (15 January 1925 – 1961)
- Jacob Pleydell-Bouverie, 8th Earl of Radnor (10 November 1927 – 11 August 2008)
- The Hon. Reuben Pleydell-Bouverie (30 December 1930 – 19 August 2020)
- Lady Phoebe Pleydell-Bouverie (25 January 1932 – 1995), who married in 1955 Hubert Beaumont Phipps (1905–1969)
- Lady Harriot Pleydell-Bouverie (b. 18 December 1935), who married in 1965 Mark Iain Tennant (b. 1932)

He married, secondly, Anne Isobel Graham Oakley, daughter of Lieutenant-Colonel Richard Oakley, on 9 October 1943 and had one child.

- The Hon. Richard Oakley Pleydell-Bouverie (b. 25 June 1947) who served as High Sheriff of Hertfordshire in 1998.

Radnor served as Governor of the French Hospital. Successive Earls of Radnor were governors of the hospital from the eighteenth century to 2015.

== Arms ==
Coat of arms of William Pleydell-Bouverie, 7th Earl of Radnor, KG, KCVO, DL
Coronet An Earl's Coronet Crest A demi double headed eagle Sable ducally gorged Or and charged on the breast with a cross crosslet Argent. Escutcheon Quarterly 1st and 4th per fess Or and Argent a double headed eagle displayed Sable charged on the breast with an escutcheon Gules a bend Vair (Bouverie); 2nd and 3rd Argent a bend Gules gutty d'eau between two ravens Sable a chief checky Or and Sable (Pleydell) Supporters Two eagles reguardant wings elevated Sable ducally gorged Or and charged on the breast with a cross crosslet Argent. Motto Patria cara carior libertas. (My country is dear, liberty is dearer.)

== Note ==
Court offices
Preceded by The Lord Clinton	Lord Warden of the Stannaries; 1933–1965	Succeeded by The Earl Waldegrave
Peerage of Great Britain
Preceded by Jacob Pleydell-Bouverie	Earl of Radnor; 1930–1968	Succeeded by Jacob Pleydell-Bouverie
