= Charles Herbert (Royal Navy officer, born 1774) =

British Royal Navy officer and politician (1774–1808)

Captain The Honourable Charles Herbert
- Born: 5 July 1774
- Died: 12 September 1808 (aged 34)
- Military career
- Allegiance: United Kingdom
- Branch: Royal Navy
- Rank: Post-captain
- Commands: HMS Placentia (1791–1792); HMS Amphitrite (1795–1797); HMS Amelia (1797–1802); HMS Uranie (1804–1805)
- Conflicts: French Revolutionary Wars; Napoleonic Wars
- Other work: Member of Parliament for Wilton from 1806 to 1807

Charles Herbert (5 July 1774 – 12 September 1808) was a British Royal Navy officer and politician who sat in the House of Commons from 1806 to 1807.

== Family ==
Charles Herbert was the second son of Henry Herbert, 1st Earl of Carnarvon, and Lady Elizabeth Alicia Maria Wyndham. He married The Honourable Bridget Augusta Byng, daughter of John Byng, 5th Viscount Torrington on 9 July 1806.

== Naval career ==
Herbert entered the navy at an early age and was Midshipman in 1790, Lieutenant in 1793 and Commander in 1794 when he was in command of the Resource in the West Indies. His father's 'never-ceasing importunities and remonstrances' resulted in his promotion a year later in 1795 to the rank of post-captain, He enjoyed a successful series of frigate commands. He commanded the 28-gun sixth rate Amphitrite, and the frigates Amelia and Uranie. Although moderately successful with prize money in both Amphitrite and Uranie, Amelia scored capture after capture during his years in command. He might have damaged his prospects early in 1802 by leaving his ship before peace was concluded, against Lord St. Vincent's express wish. A year later, St. Vincent was prepared to overlook this 'desertion' and although he doubted if he could do anything for Herbert afloat, thought he might find him employment ashore. Not long afterwards, he was captain of a convoy to the West Indian fleet.

== Member of Parliament ==
Herbert was elected as Member of Parliament for Wilton in the General Election of 1806. In 1807 he was displaced by Lord Pembroke at the dissolution, in favour of his uncle and namesake Charles Herbert.

== Death ==
A year later Herbert was reported to have deserted his family to go as a 'land volunteer' to the Peninsula. On 12 Sept. 1808 he was drowned with a companion after their boat overturned in Gijon harbour.

Parliament of Great Britain
| Preceded by The Viscount FitzWilliam; Ralph Sheldon | Member of Parliament for Wilton; 1806 – 1807; With: Ralph Sheldon 1804–1807 | Succeeded by Viscount FitzHarris; Ralph Sheldon |
