= 1876 South Wiltshire by-election =

UK Parliamentary by-election

The 1876 South Wiltshire by-election was fought on 4 January 1876. The by-election was fought due to the incumbent Conservative MP, Lord Henry Thynne, becoming Treasurer of the Household. It was retained by the incumbent.
