= Henry Herbert, 1st Earl of Carnarvon =

British politician (1741–1811)

The Right Honourable The Earl of Carnarvon PC
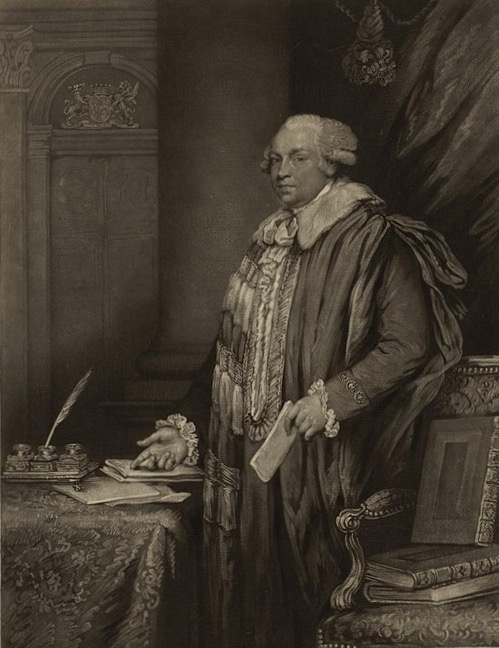

Master of the Horse
- In office 11 February 1806 – 31 March 1807
- Monarch: George III
- Prime Minister: The Lord Grenville
- Preceded by: The Marquess of Hertford
- Succeeded by: The Duke of Montrose

Personal details
- Born: 20 August 1741
- Died: 3 June 1811 (aged 69)
- Party: Whig
- Spouse: Lady Elizabeth Alicia Maria Wyndham
- Children: Henry, 2nd Earl; Charles; William; Frances; George; Algernon
- Parent(s): William Herbert; Catherine Elizabeth Tewes
- Education: Magdalene College, Cambridge

Henry Herbert, 1st Earl of Carnarvon PC (20 August 1741 – 3 June 1811), known as The Lord Porchester from 1780 to 1793, was a British Whig politician who sat in the House of Commons from 1768 to 1780 when he was raised to the peerage as Baron Porchester. He served as Master of the Horse from 1806 to 1807 in the Ministry of All the Talents headed by Lord Grenville.

== Background and education ==
Herbert was the son of Major-General the Honourable William Herbert (c. 1696 – 31 March 1757), fifth son of Thomas Herbert, 8th Earl of Pembroke. His mother was Catherine Elizabeth Tewes (d. 28 August 1770). Educated at Eton and Magdalene College, Cambridge, he inherited Highclere Castle from his uncle the Honourable Robert Sawyer Herbert in 1769.

== Political career ==
Herbert sat in the House of Commons as one of two representatives for Wilton from 1768 to 1780. The latter year he was raised to the peerage as Baron Porchester, of Highclere in the County of Southampton. In 1793 he was further honoured when he was made Earl of the Town and County of Carnarvon, in the Principality of Wales. He later served as Master of the Horse from 1806 to 1807 in the Ministry of All the Talents headed by Lord Grenville and was admitted to the Privy Council in 1806.

He was Colonel of the Wiltshire Militia from 1778 to 1811.

== Marriage and progeny ==
Arms of 1st Earl of Carnarvon, four quarters (Herbert, Talbot, de Vere, Sawyer of Highclere: Azure, a fess chequy sable and or between three sea-pies (proper?)) impaling Wyndham. Brushford Church, Somerset, above the effigy of his great-great-grandson Hon. Aubrey Herbert (1880–1923), of Pixton Park, Somerset, second son of the 4th Earl

On 15 July 1771 Lord Carnarvon married Lady Elizabeth Alicia Maria Wyndham a daughter of Charles Wyndham, 2nd Earl of Egremont, by whom he had five sons and one daughter:

- Henry George Herbert, 2nd Earl of Carnarvon (1772–1833), eldest son and heir.
- Capt. Hon. Charles Herbert (1774–1808).
- Very Rev. Hon. William Herbert (1778–1847).
- Lady Frances Herbert (c. 1782–1830), who married Thomas Moreton, 1st Earl of Ducie and had issue.
- Rev. Hon. George Herbert (1789–1825), vicar of Tibenham, Norfolk.
- Hon. Algernon Herbert (1792–1855), antiquary.

== Death and burial ==
Carnarvon died in June 1811, aged 69.

Parliament of Great Britain
Preceded by Robert Sawyer Herbert; Nicholas Herbert	Member of Parliament for Wilton; 1768–1780; With: Nicholas Herbert 1768–1775; Charles Herbert 1775–1780	Succeeded by Lord Herbert; William Gerard Hamilton
Political offices
Preceded by The Marquess of Hertford	Master of the Horse; 1806–1807	Succeeded by The Duke of Montrose
Peerage of Great Britain
New creation	Earl of Carnarvon; 1793–1811	Succeeded by Henry Herbert
New creation	Baron Porchester; 1780–1811	Succeeded by Henry Herbert
