= Thomas Martin (banker) =

English politician (c. 1679–1765)

Thomas Martin (c. 1679–1765), of Cheshunt, Hertfordshire and Clapham, Surrey was a British banker and Whig politician who sat in the House of Commons from 1727 to 1734.

Martin was the eldest son of William Martin of Evesham, Worcestershire. He joined the banking firm of Smith and Stone, at the sign of ‘the Grasshopper’, in Lombard Street, London before 1699. In 1703, he became a partner and in 1711 sole partner of what became Martins Bank. He married Elizabeth Lowe, daughter of Richard Lowe of Cheshunt.

At the 1727 British general election Martin was returned as Whig Member of Parliament for Wilton. He voted with the Administration in all recorded divisions. He did not stand at the 1734 British general election.

Martin died without issue on 21 April 1765.

Parliament of Great Britain
Preceded by Hon. Robert Sawyer Herbert; Thomas Pitt	Member of Parliament for Wilton; 1727–1734; With: Hon. Robert Sawyer Herbert	Succeeded by Hon. Robert Sawyer Herbert; Colonel the Hon. William Herbert
