= Robert Sawyer Herbert =

British politician (1693–1769)

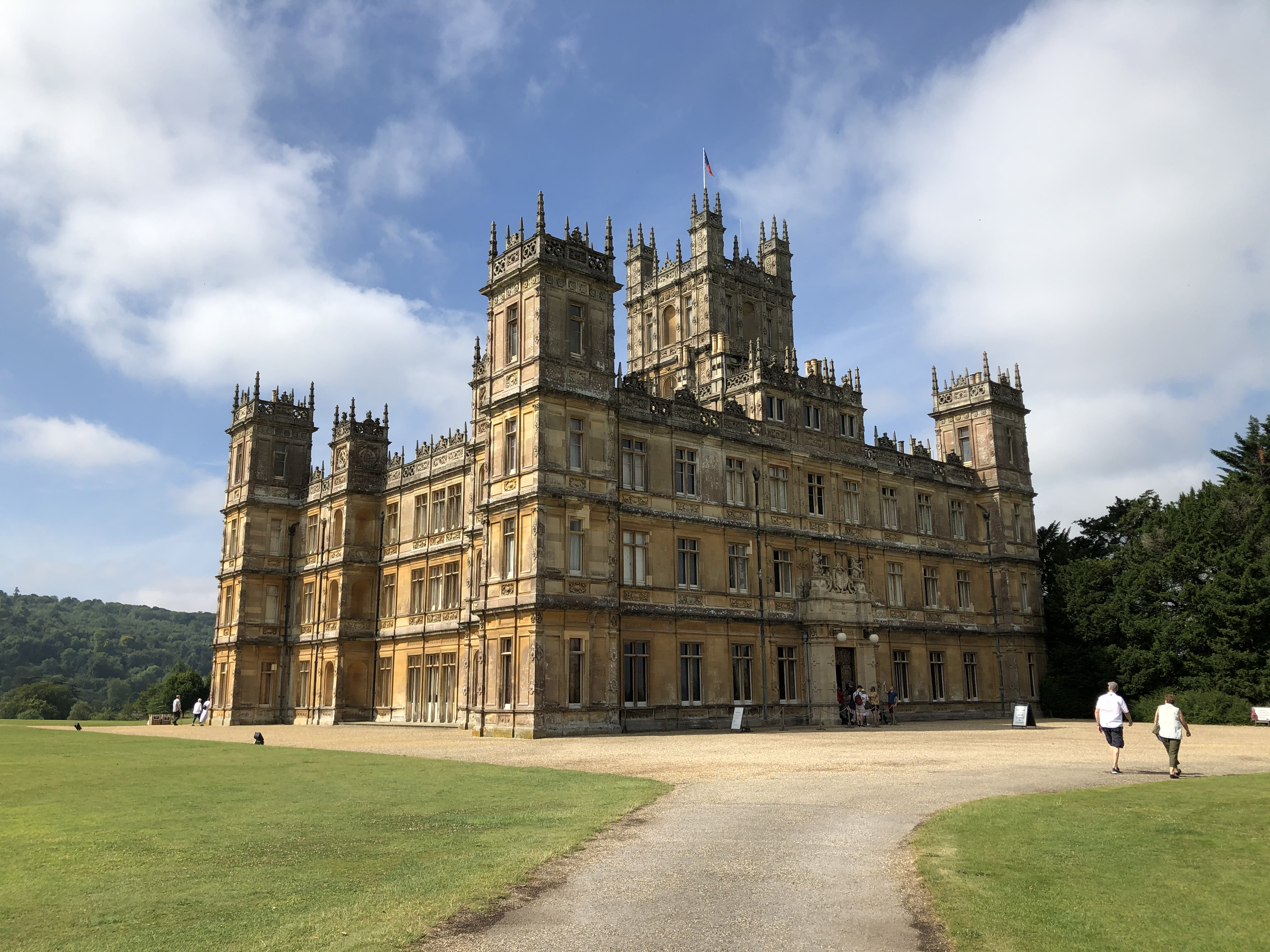
Highclere Castle

Robert Sawyer Herbert (28 January 1693 – 1769) of Highclere Castle, Hampshire, was a British politician who sat in the House of Commons for 46 years from 1722 to 1768 and from 1750 to 1756 was Lord Lieutenant of Wiltshire.

== Early life ==
Herbert was the second son of Thomas Herbert, 8th Earl of Pembroke and his wife Margaret Sawyer, daughter of Sir Robert Sawyer who died in 1692. In 1706, he succeeded to his mother's estates and inherited Highclere Castle from his maternal grandfather, who entailed his estates on the unborn younger sons of his daughter. He matriculated at Christ Church, Oxford on 5 July 1709, aged 16. Before 1723, he married Mary Smith, daughter of John Smith, Speaker of the House of Commons.

== Career ==
Herbert was returned unopposed as Member of Parliament for Wilton at the 1722 general election on his father's interest. He was appointed Groom of the Bedchamber to George I in 1723. He was returned again for Wilton at the 1727 general election following the death of George I, and was appointed Commissioner of revenue for Ireland in 1727. At the 1734 general election he was returned again for Wilton. He was transferred to become Lord of Trade in 1737. He retained the post until 1751 but it was later said by Pelham ‘he has been of the Board of Trade upwards of 20 years, tho’ in it I believe not as many times’. He was returned as one of the MPs for Wilton at the general elections of 1741 and 1747. In 1750 he was appointed Lord Lieutenant of Wiltshire, succeeding his older brother Henry Herbert, 9th Earl of Pembroke, but resigned the commission in 1756. He was appointed surveyor general of crown lands by Pelham in 1751. He was returned again for Wilton in the general elections of 1754 and 1761. He is not known to have made a speech in Parliament. For most of his career, he held minor government posts, and voted for successive Administrations in all recorded divisions. Rockingham classified him in November 1766 as prepared to serve any Administration.

== Death and legacy ==
Herbert died on 25 April 1769. His brothers Hon. Nicholas, Thomas and William Herbert were also MPs. He left Highclere Castle to his nephew Henry Herbert, son of his brother William.

Parliament of Great Britain
Preceded by John London; Thomas Pitt	Member of Parliament for Wilton; 1722–1768; With: Thomas Pitt 1722-1727; Thomas Martin 1727-1734; Colonel the Hon. William Herbert 1734-1757; Hon. Nicholas Herbert 1757-1768	Succeeded by Henry Herbert; Hon. Nicholas Herbert
Honorary titles
Preceded by Henry Herbert, 9th Earl of Pembroke	Lord Lieutenant of Wiltshire; 1750–1756	Succeeded by Henry Herbert, 10th Earl of Pembroke
