= Gadebridge =

Coordinates: 51.764°N 0.488°W

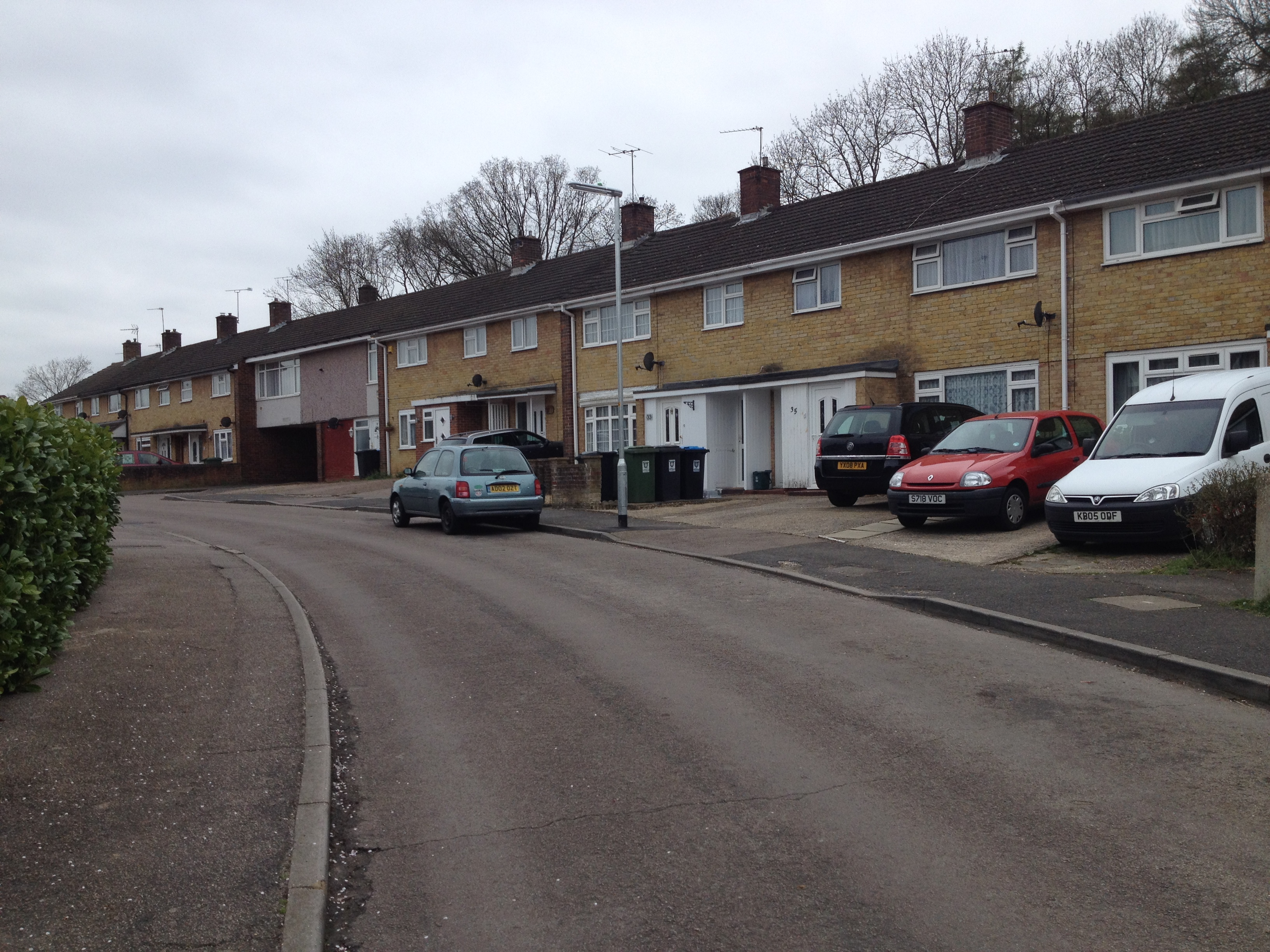
Marlins Turn, Gadebridge district, Hemel Hempstead

Gadebridge is a district of Hemel Hempstead in Hertfordshire, UK, located north west of Hemel Hempstead old town. It was developed in the 1960s on land that once formed part of the grounds of Gadebridge House.

It centres on the Rossgate shopping parade. Gadebridge Park is the largest green space in Hemel Hempstead. A major Roman villa was discovered here at the time of its development (Gadebridge Park Roman Villa).

The main road through the district is Galley Hill which passes the Rossgate shops, Rossgate primary school and Gadebridge Baptist Church.

Gadebridge district, and Galley Hill, were both used at the time of their construction in 1956 as a filming location for the Hammer Horror sci fi film Quatermass.

At the 2011 Census the population of the Dacorum ward of Gadebridge (which includes nearby Piccotts End) was 5,655.

== See also ==
Gadebridge Park
