= William Wyndham (1796–1862) =

English politician (1796–1862)

William Wyndham JP DL (1796–1862), sometimes numbered William Wyndham V, was a Wiltshire landowner and Member of Parliament.

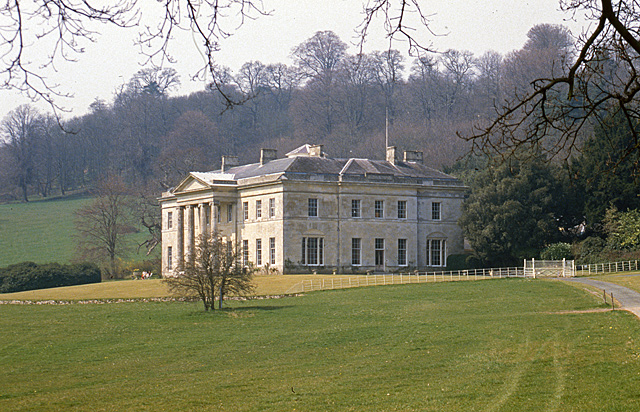
Dinton House, now Philipps House

He was the eldest son of another William Wyndham (1769–1841), by his marriage in 1794 to Laetitia Popham, a daughter of Alexander Popham, a Master in Chancery. His father was a descendant of Sir Wadham Wyndham (died 1668).

Wyndham was educated at Harrow and Christ Church, Oxford, and was commissioned into the Wiltshire Yeomanry. In 1831 he married Ellen Heathcote, the eldest daughter of the Rev. Samuel Heathcote, of Bramshaw Hill, Hampshire. They had eight children, William (1834), Edmund (1835), Ellen (1836), Arthur (1837), Wadham (1838–1847), Hugh (1839), Thomas Heathcote (1845), and Laetitia.

In 1841 Wyndham inherited from his father the estates based on Dinton House and at the general election of 1852 was elected as one of the members of parliament for South Wiltshire. Dod's Parliamentary Companion described him as "of old Whig principles, inclining to Conservatism." Apart from his country house in Wiltshire, he also had a town house in Bryanston Square, Westminster. He held the South Wiltshire seat until 1859.

When he died in 1862, he left most of his property to his eldest son, William Wyndham (1834–1914). The Devizes and Wiltshire Gazette said in a short obituary that he was "a fine specimen of the old English type of gentleman... a thorough sportsman, and a man truly respected and beloved by all who knew him."
