= Nicholas Herbert (politician, died 1775) =

British politician (c.1706–1775)

- Born: 1706
- Died: 1 February 1775 (aged 68–69)

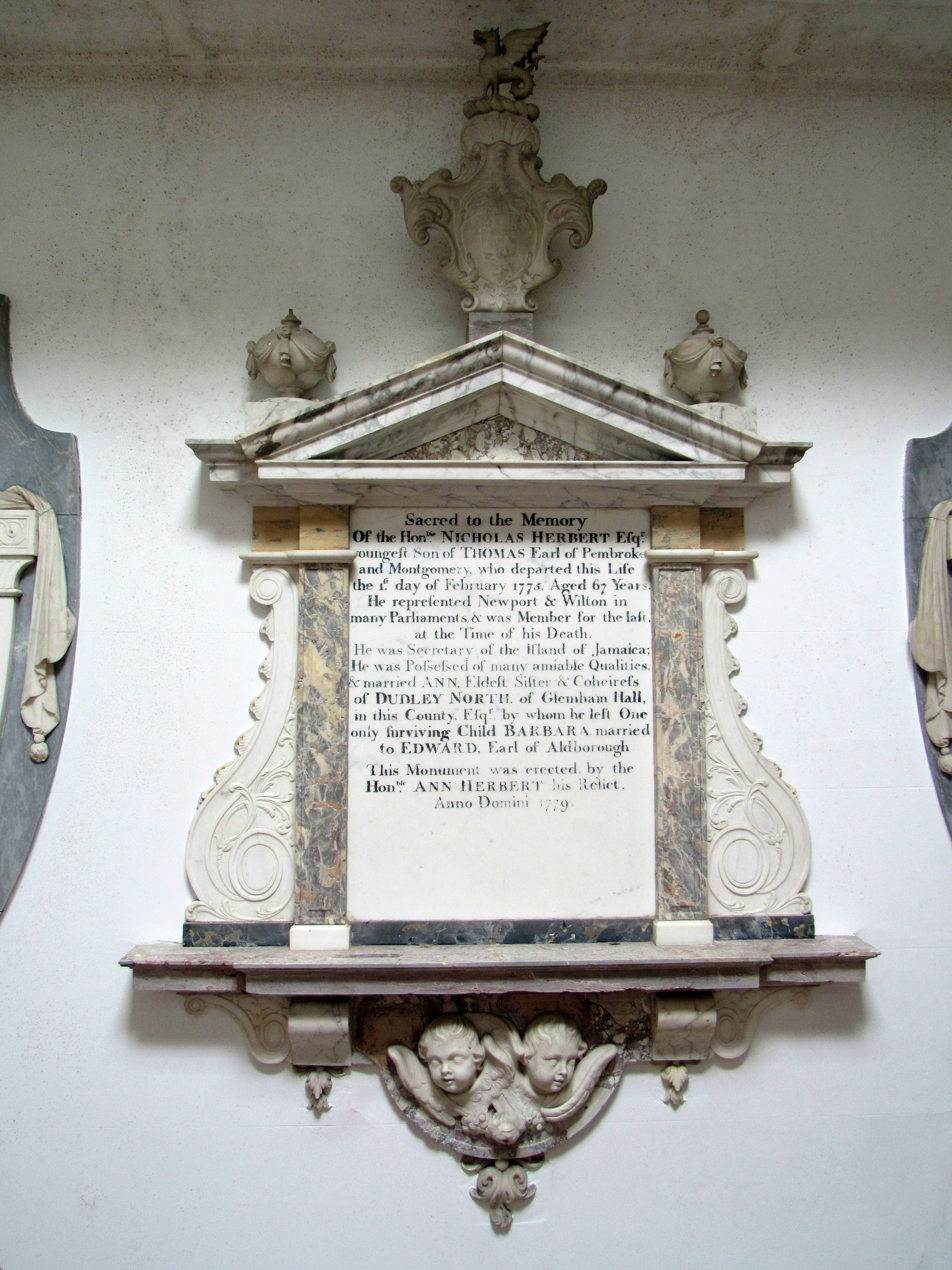
Nicholas Herbert memorial in St Andrew's Church, Little Glemham

Hon. Nicholas Herbert (c.1706 – 1 February 1775) was a British politician who sat in the House of Commons between 1740 and 1774 and a member of the Herbert family. He became the Treasurer of Princess Amelia of Great Britain, of the Royal House of Hanover, in 1757.

== Life ==
Herbert was born at Werrington, Devon, the 7th son of Thomas Herbert, 8th Earl of Pembroke of Wilton House, and his first wife Margaret Sawyer of Highclere Castle, daughter of Sir Robert Sawyer MP of Highclere, Hampshire. He was educated probably at Eton College in 1725 and matriculated at Christ Church, Oxford on 2 December 1726, aged 20. He married Anne North, daughter of Dudley North and Katherine Yale, the daughter of Elihu Yale, on 19 July 1737.

Herbert was returned as Member of Parliament for Newport in a by-election on 22 January 1740 on the Morice interest. He was returned unopposed in 1741. From 1742 to 1745 he was cashier and accountant to the Treasurer of the Navy. He was returned unopposed at Newport in 1747 and in a contest in 1754

In 1756 Herbert vacated his seat at Newport and was returned in a by-election on 17 April 1757 as MP for Wilton on the interest of his nephew Henry Herbert, 10th Earl of Pembroke. He was appointed Treasurer to Princess Amelia in 1757. However he lost his place as treasurer when George III came to the throne and was frustrated at not being offered any other post. He was returned unopposed at Wilton in 1761. In 1765 he was appointed Secretary of Jamaica, a post he held until his death. He was returned unopposed at Wilton in 1768 and 1774. He is not known to have spoken in Parliament or to have voted against any Administration.

Herbert died on 1 February 1775 and was buried at Little Glemham. His only surviving child Barbara married Edward Stratford, 2nd Earl of Aldborough.

Parliament of Great Britain
Preceded by Thomas Herbert; Sir John Molesworth	Member of Parliament for Newport; 1740– 1754; With: Sir John Molesworth; Thomas Bury	Succeeded by John Lee; Edward Bacon
Preceded by Hon. Robert Sawyer Herbert; Colonel the Hon. William Herbert	Member of Parliament for Wilton; 1757–1775; With: Hon. Robert Sawyer Herbert; Henry Herbert	Succeeded by Henry Herbert; Captain Charles Herbert
