= Gadebridge House =

Coordinates: 51.7625°N 0.4822°W

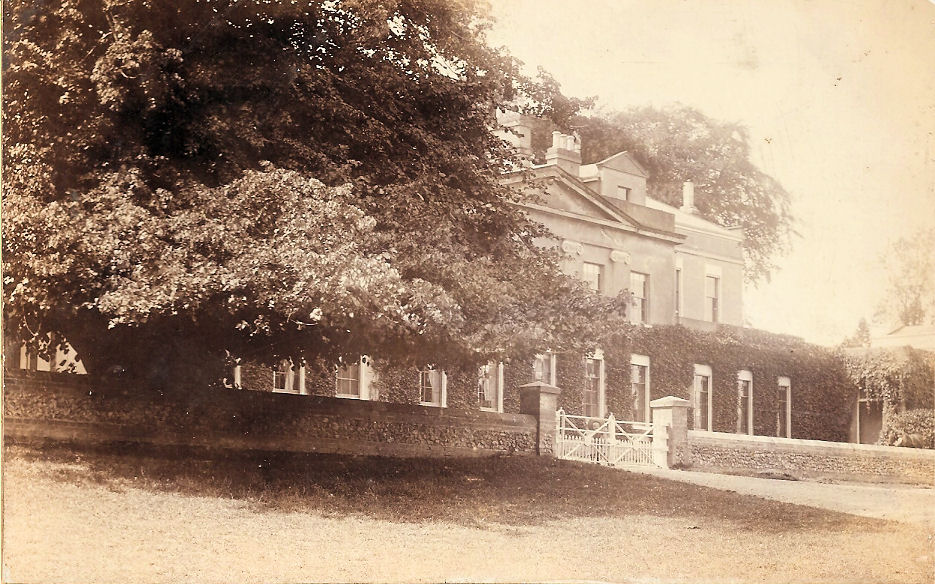
Gadebridge House

Gadebridge House was a country house at Gadebridge in Hertfordshire.

== History ==
The house was built for Sir Astley Paston Cooper, a surgeon, who moved there in 1811. In around 1840 Cooper commissioned an iron bridge as part of the approach to the site. The house was inherited by Lionel Hervey-Bathurst in 1905, following the death of the 3rd Baronet. The house passed down the Paston-Cooper family until it became Gadebridge Park School in 1914. Although the site accommodated a temporary army camp during World War I, the house remained a school until 1963 when the school was forced out of its premises by the Commission for New Towns as part of its development of the new town. The house was demolished and Kodak built a Marketing Education Centre on the site: the centre was itself demolished in 1995 and the site is now used for housing.
