= Levi Lapper Morse =

English grocer, draper and politician (1853–1913)

Levi Lapper Morse

Levi Lapper Morse (24 May 1853 – 10 September 1913) was an English grocer and draper and Liberal Party politician.

== Family and education ==
Morse was the son of Charles Morse from Stratton St Margaret, near Swindon in Wiltshire. He was educated at the High School, Swindon. He married Winifred, daughter of Isaac Humphries of Broad Hinton, Wiltshire and they had two sons and four daughters. Their son William Ewart Morse was also a Liberal politician in Wiltshire and a member of parliament.

== Career ==
Morse was a prominent Swindon shopkeeper. He owned Morse's department store on Regent Street, Swindon the second most important of Swindon's stores for many years. Mostly known as a grocer and draper, he also owned a chain of other shops in the south-west and a large mail order business.

== Politics ==
=== Local politics ===
Morse served as an Alderman on Wiltshire County Council and also served as a justice of the peace. He was Mayor of Swindon in 1901.

=== Parliament ===
Morse was elected Liberal MP for the Wilton or South Division of Wiltshire at the 1906 general election. He gained the seat from the sitting Conservative, James Archibald Morrison by 4,272 votes to 3,458 a majority of 724 Morse did not seek re-election in 1910 because of ill-health. In 1908 he was one of the members of the British group of the Inter-parliamentary Union who attended its conference in Berlin.

== Religion ==
Morse was a devout member of the Primitive Methodist Church and was a delegate to its centenary conference in Toronto, Ontario, Canada. He also became vice-president of the Primitive Methodist conference in 1896.

== Death ==
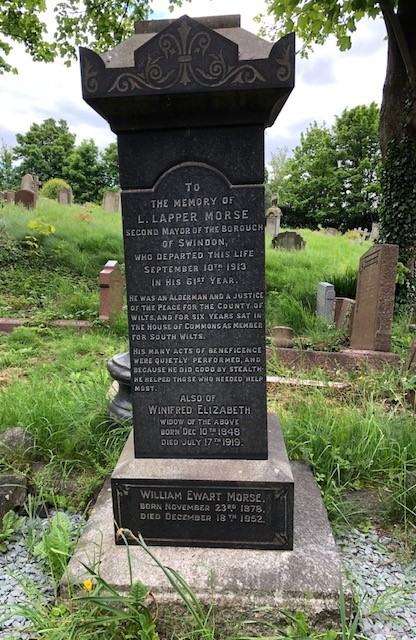
Levi Lapper Morse's memorial in Radnor Street Cemetery, Swindon.

He died at his home, The Croft, Swindon on 10 September 1913 aged 60 years. Swindon solicitor A. Ernest Withy published notice of his estate in the London Gazette, 31 October 1913.

He is buried in Radnor Street Cemetery, Swindon.

Parliament of the United Kingdom
Preceded by James Archibald Morrison	Member of Parliament for Wilton; 1906 – January 1910	Succeeded by Sir Charles Bathurst
