= Jacob Bouverie =

Jacob Bouverie may refer to:

- Jacob des Bouverie (1659–1722), English politician, MP for Hythe
- Jacob des Bouverie, 1st Viscount Folkestone (1694–1761), English politician

== See also ==
- Jacob Pleydell-Bouverie (disambiguation)
