= John Gauntlett =

English politician

John Gauntlett (c. 1643 – 14 April 1719) was an English Tory politician. He sat as MP for Wilton from 1695 till 1702 and 28 November 1702 till 1708.

== Family and education ==
He was the oldest son of William Gauntlett (died 1690) and Margery. He married Margaret (died 1674) and they had one son (who predeceased him) and two daughters (who predeceased him).

== Political career ==
In 1670, he lent approximately £500 to the Crown. In 1674, he was granted the reversion of a clerkship of the signet. Circa. 1684, he succeeded to the clerkship of the signet. In 1685, him and his father were named burgesses of Wilton under the charter of King James II.

In 1695, he was first elected MP for Wilton and assisted Sir Edward Nicholas at the Shaftesbury election. In 1696, he signed the Association, pledging loyalty to William III. In January 1701, he successfully contested and retained his Wilton seat. In 1702, he was defeated at the general election because of an influx of Dissenting voters but later regained his seat on petition. On 28 November 1704, he did not support the Tory Tack. On 25 October 1705, he voted against the Court (Whig) candidate for Speaker, John Smith instead supporting the Tory William Bromley. In 1708, he stood for Wilton with William Nicholas but was defeated by his next-door neighbour Charles Mompesson. In 1710, he intended to stand again at Wilton but withdrew. Gauntlett served during both the Parliament of 1695–1698 and the Parliament of 1698–1701.

== Later life ==
In 1716, he resigned his clerkship of the signet though he remained employed in the Privy Council office. He died on 14 April 1719 and was buried at Netherhampton. He left his estate to his nephew and godson, Gauntlett Fry.
