= Westbrook Hay Hill Climb =

Motorsports event near Hemel Hempstead, England

Coordinates: 51.743°N 0.5098°W

The Westbrook Hay Hill Climb was an annual motorsports event near Hemel Hempstead in England, where drivers competed on an uphill course. The Herts County Automobile & Aero Club held the first Westbrook Hay speed hillclimb in 1953, and organised all events there until the course closed in 1962. Between 1959 and 1962 the track hosted four rounds of the British Hill Climb Championship.

A 1953 edition of Motor Sport describes the course as "situated in the Westbrook Hay estate near Hemel Hempstead on the main Hemel to Berkhamsted road (A41). The timed length will be 500 yards and the road surface is tarmac. From the start on a gradient of 1 in 3 the road takes a fast left-hand sweep to come to a right-angled bend also to the left. From there the road sweeps to the right to the finishing line. The overall gradient is 1 in 11."

The course started just to the south of the A41 (today near the junction with the A4251), between Hemel Hempstead and Bourne End and climbed 650 yards up the main drive to Westbrook Hay House, today occupied by Westbrook Hay School.

== Events and past winners ==
Year	Driver	Vehicle	Time	Notes
1953	M.A.H. Christie	Cooper 1,100 c.c.	20.76 sec	3 October.
1954	Tony Marsh	Cooper S/C	25.59 sec	650 yard course.
1955	A.E. Marsh	Cooper	26.01 sec	21 May.
1956	Tony Marsh	Cooper	25.05 sec R	21 July.
1957	David Good	Cooper 1,000 c.c.		13 July.
1958	D. Boshier-Jones	Cooper 1,100 c.c.	25.09 sec	12 July.
1959	D. Boshier-Jones	Cooper-JAP	25.46 sec	11 July. R.A.C. Championship Round.
1960	D. Boshier-Jones	Cooper-JAP 1,100 c.c.	24.06 sec R	9 July.
1961	David Good	Cooper-JAP	24.18 sec	8 July.
1962	Arthur Owen	Cooper-Climax	22.85 sec R	7 July.
1963	Event cancelled.			

Key: R = Course Record.

== See also ==
- Great Auclum National Speed Hill Climb
