= William Wightman (English MP, died 1580) =

English politician

William Wightman (by 1517 – 1580) was an English politician. He was a Member (MP) of the Parliament of England for Midhurst in 1547, Wilton in March 1553, 1563 and 1571; Poole in April 1554, Carmarthen Boroughs in 1555, and Ludgershall in 1559.
