= Thomas Moleyns =

Member of the Parliament of England

Thomas Moleyns or Molyn, of Wilton, Wiltshire, was an English Member of Parliament and churchwarden.

He was a Member (MP) of the Parliament of England for Wilton in 1386. In April 1394, he was a churchwarden of St. Mary's parish, Bread Street, Wilton. Nothing is recorded of his family or background. His dates of birth and death are unknown.

Parliament of England
Preceded by ? ?	Member of Parliament for Wilton; 1394; With: Thomas Cuttyng	Succeeded by Thomas Cuttyng; William Chitterne
