= Sir Thomas Grove, 1st Baronet =

English Liberal politician

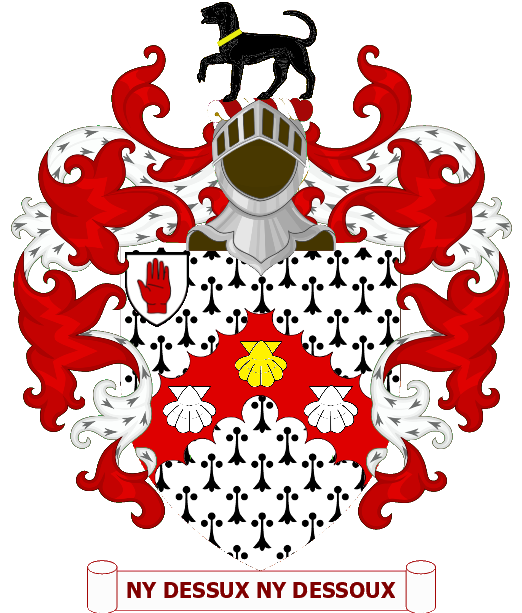
- Crest: A talbot passant Sable collared Or.
- Shield: Ermine on a chevron engrailed Gules three scallops the centre one Or between two others Argent.
- Motto: Ny Dessux Ny Dessoux (Neither Above Nor Below)

Sir Thomas Fraser Grove, 1st Baronet DL JP (27 November 1823 – 14 January 1897) was an English Liberal politician who sat in the House of Commons between 1868 and 1892.

== Early life ==
Grove was the son of John Grove of Ferne House, near Salisbury and his wife Jean Fraser, daughter of Sir William Fraser, 1st Baronet. He was educated at Sherborne.

== Career ==
Grove was captain in the 6th Dragoons and a deputy lieutenant and J.P. for Wiltshire. He was High Sheriff of Wiltshire in 1863 and a Hon. Lieutenant-Colonel of the Wiltshire Yeomanry Cavalry.

Grove was elected at the 1865 general election as Member of Parliament (MP) for South Wiltshire, and was re-elected in 1868. After his defeat at the 1874 general election he did not stand again until after the 1885 redistribution of seats. He was made a baronet on 18 March 1874, of Ferne House, in the parish of Donhead St Andrew, in the County of Wiltshire,

At the 1885 general election Grove was elected MP for Wilton. When the Liberal Party split in 1886 over Irish Home Rule, he joined the breakaway Liberal Unionist Party which opposed Home Rule. He was re-elected unopposed at the 1886 general election, but at the 1892 general election he lost his seat to the Conservative Party candidate, Viscount Folkestone.

Grove was elected unopposed to Wiltshire County Council in 1889.

== Personal life ==
Grove married Katherine Grace O'Grady, daughter of the Hon. Waller O'Grady, Q.C, on 16 January 1847.

After her death on 8 June 1879, he married Frances Hinton (née Northcote) Barnewall, daughter of Henry Northcote and widow of the Hon. Frederick Barnewall.

Grove died at the age of 73. He was succeeded in the baronetcy by his son Walter.

Honorary titles
Preceded by John Elton Mervyn Prower	High Sheriff of Wiltshire; 1863–1864	Succeeded by John Lewis Phipps
Parliament of the United Kingdom
Preceded by Frederick Hervey-Bathurst; Lord Henry Thynne	Member of Parliament for South Wiltshire; 1865 – 1874; With: Lord Henry Thynne	Succeeded by Lord Henry Thynne; Viscount Folkestone
Preceded by Sidney Herbert	Member of Parliament for Wilton; 1885 – 1892	Succeeded by Viscount Folkestone
Baronetage of the United Kingdom
New creation	Baronet (of Ferne, Wiltshire); 1874–1897	Succeeded by Walter Grove
