= John Cole (fl. 1372–1394) =

Member of the Parliament of England

John Cole or Culle, of Wilton, Wiltshire, was an English coroner and Member of Parliament.

He was a Member (MP) of the Parliament of England for Wilton in 1372, 1381, October 1382, October 1383, April 1384, 1393 and 1394.
