= Sir Frederick Hervey-Bathurst, 3rd Baronet =

English cricketer

Frederick Hervey-Bathurst
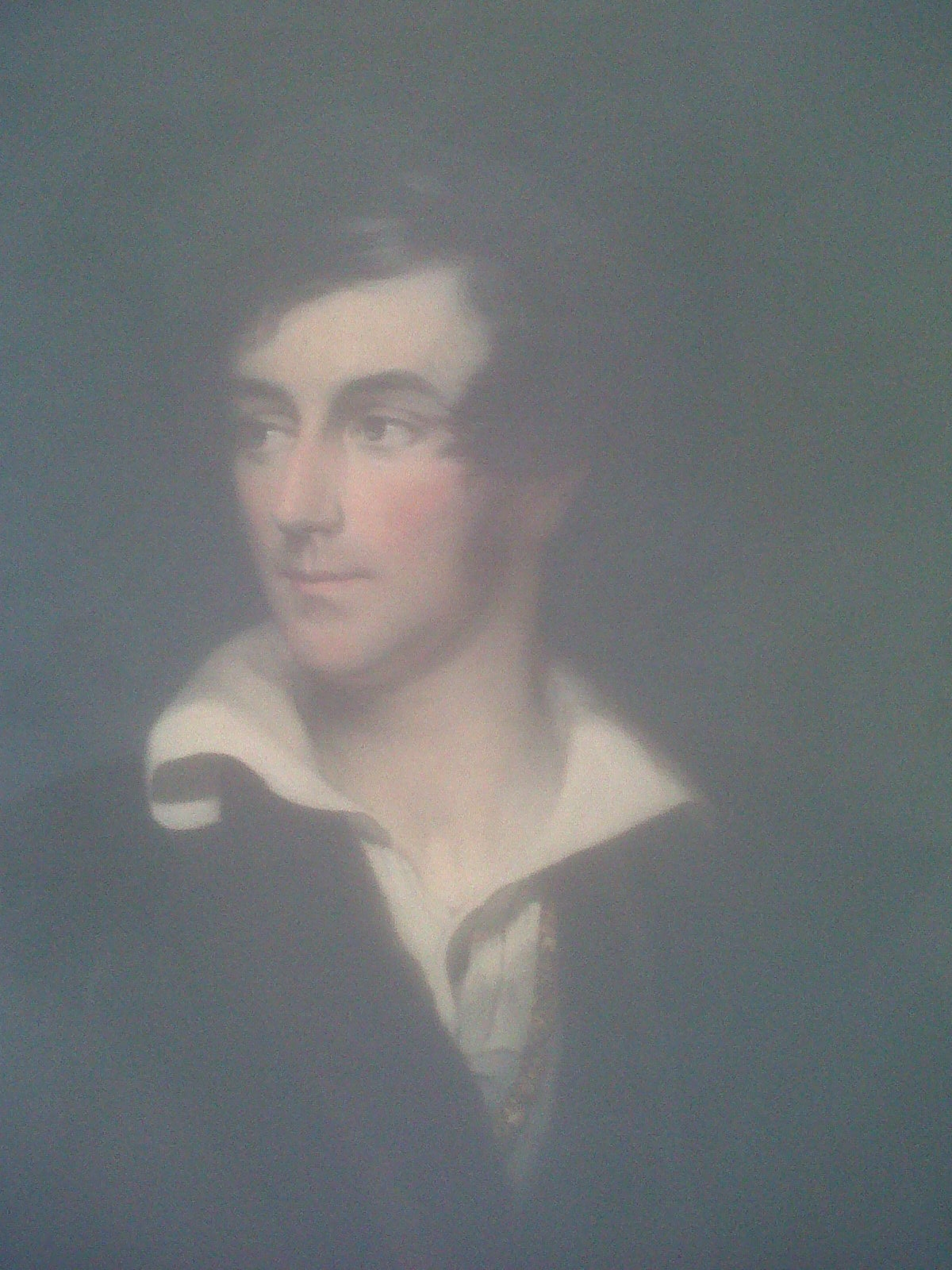
- Portrait of Sir Frederick as a young man

Personal information
- Full name: Frederick Hutchison Hervey-Bathurst
- Born: 6 June 1807; Isles of Scilly, Cornwall, England
- Died: 29 October 1881 (aged 74); Clarendon Park, Wiltshire, England
- Batting: Right-handed
- Bowling: Right-arm fast
- Relatives: Sir Frederick Thomas Arthur Hervey-Bathurst (son); Lionel Hervey-Bathurst (son); Hervey Tudway (great-grandson)

Domestic team information
- Years: Team
- 1832–1855: MCC
- 1842–1861: Hampshire

Career statistics
Competition	First-class
Matches	92
Runs scored	817
Batting average	5.92
100s/50s	0/0
Top score	46
Balls bowled	4,817
Wickets	349
Bowling average	13.02
5 wickets in innings	32
10 wickets in match	8
Best bowling	7/?
Catches/stumpings	41/–
- Source: Cricinfo, 3 May 2010

Sir Frederick Hutchison Hervey-Bathurst, 3rd Baronet (6 June 1807 – 29 October 1881) was an English cricketer who played for Hampshire, MCC and the Gentlemen of England. He was a right-handed batsman who bowled right-arm roundarm fast.

In October 1818, while a student at Winchester College, he changed his surname from Hervey to Hervey-Bathurst. He succeeded his father as 3rd Baronet in September 1824. In 1857–58, he served as President of the Marylebone Cricket Club.

== Career ==
Hervey-Bathurst made his first-class debut in 1831 for the Bs against an early England side.

He made his debut for the Marylebone Cricket Club against the Cambridge Town Club. Hervey-Bathurst would represent the MCC in 28 first-class matches up until 1855. In his 28 matches for the club, he scored 306 runs at a batting average of 7.46 and with a high score of 34. With the ball he took 63 wickets at a bowling average of 12.00, with best figures in an innings of 6/?.

In 1842, he made his debut for Hampshire against the Marylebone Cricket Club. Hervey-Bathurst represented Hampshire in 12 first-class matches between 1842 and 1861. In his 12 matches, he scored 203 runs at an average of 9.22 and a high score of 46. With the ball he took 72 wickets at an average of 14.23, with a best return of 7 wickets in an innings, although his exact best figures are unknown.

Hervey-Bathurst was one of three local gentlemen (alongside Thomas Chamberlayne and Sir John Barker-Mill) who financed the development of the Antelope Ground, Southampton, and installed the former Hampshire and Surrey cricketer Daniel Day in the Antelope Hotel.

As well as representing the above major sides, he also represented the Gentlemen in 20 Gentlemen v Players fixtures, where he took 73 wickets at an average of 11.25, with best figures of 7/?. He also represented the Gentlemen of England in 12 first-class matches, where he took 88 wickets at an average of 19.40, with a best return of 6 wickets in an innings. Hervey-Bathurst also represented A to K, England, the Gentlemen of Marylebone Cricket Club, the Gentlemen of the South, the South of England and the West of England.

Hervey-Bathurst played a major part in a rare win by the Gentlemen over the Players at Lord's in July 1846. He partnered Alfred Mynn, and they shared eighteen wickets in the match to dismiss the Players for 85 and 145. The Gentlemen replied with 105 and 126/9 to win by a single wicket. In their second innings, the Gentlemen had reached 124/8, needing one to tie and two to win, and they lost their ninth wicket at that point. Their last man Walter Mynn was able to score the final two runs. Hervey-Bathurst had bowling figures of 3/48 and 5/64; Alfred Mynn took 7/37 and 3/65. The other two wickets were both run outs.

In his overall first-class career, Hervey-Bathurst played 92 matches, scoring 817 runs at an average of 9.92, with a high score of 46. With the ball he took 349 wickets at an average of 13.02, with 32 five wicket hauls, 8 ten wicket hauls, and a best return of 7 wickets in an innings, although his exact figures are unknown.

Hervey-Bathurst died at Clarendon Park, Wiltshire on 19 October 1881.

== Family ==
Hervey-Bathurst was the start of a cricketing family. He was the father of Frederick Hervey-Bathurst, 4th Baronet who represented both the MCC and the Hampshire team as well as Hampshire County Cricket Club. His other son, Lionel Hervey-Bathurst represented Hampshire in two first-class matches in 1875.

His great-grandson Hervey Tudway played one first-class match for Somerset in 1910 and fought in the First World War; he was killed in action in 1914.

Baronetage of the United Kingdom
Preceded by Frederick Hervey-Bathurst	Baronet (of Lainston); 1824–1881	Succeeded by Frederick Arthur Hervey-Bathurst
