= 1877 Wilton by-election =

UK Parliamentary by-election

The 1877 Wilton by-election was fought on 19 February 1877. The by-election was fought due to the resignation of the incumbent Liberal MP, Sir Edmund Antrobus. It was won by the Conservative candidate Hon. Sidney Herbert.

1877 Wilton by-election
Party	Candidate	Votes	%	±%
Conservative	Sidney Herbert	751	80.1	New
Liberal	John Freeman Norris	187	19.9	N/A
Majority		564	60.2	N/A
Turnout		938	86.3	N/A
Registered electors		1,087		
Conservative gain from Liberal		Swing	N/A	
