= 1900 Wilton by-election =

1900 UK parliamentary by-election

The 1900 Wilton by-election was a parliamentary by-election held for the British House of Commons constituency of Wilton in Wiltshire on 17 July 1900. The seat had become vacant when the Conservative Member of Parliament Viscount Folkestone had succeeded to the peerage as Earl of Radnor. He had held the seat since the 1892 general election.

The Conservative candidate, James Archibald Morrison, was returned unopposed.

This was the last by-election before the general election held from September to October 1900.

== See also ==
- Wilton (UK Parliament constituency)
- 1918 Wilton by-election
- The town of Wilton
- List of United Kingdom by-elections
