= 1918 Wilton by-election =

UK parliamentary by-election

The 1918 Wilton by-election was a parliamentary by-election held for the British House of Commons constituency of Wilton in Wiltshire on 6 November 1918. The seat had become vacant when the Conservative Member of Parliament Sir Charles Bathurst had been elevated to the peerage as Viscount Bledisloe. He had held the seat since the January 1910 general election.

The Conservative candidate, Hugh Morrison, was returned unopposed.

This was the last by-election before the general election held in December 1918, when the Wilton constituency was abolished.

== See also ==
- Wilton (UK Parliament constituency)
- 1900 Wilton by-election
- The town of Wilton
- List of United Kingdom by-elections
