= Henry Bodenham =

16th-century English politician

Henry Bodenham (1511/12 – 1573), of Ebbesborne Wake, Wiltshire, was an English politician.

He was a member (MP) of the parliament of England for Wiltshire in 1555 and for Wilton in 1559.

Notable accomplishments include serving in Boulogne under Sir Tomas Poynings in 1545 and investigating allegations of embezzlement at South Newton in February 1546.

On 1 October 1555, he became a knight of the shire with the help of the Earl of Pembroke.
