= Thomas Cuttyng =

Member of the Parliament of England

Thomas Cuttyng (died 1412 or after), of Wilton, Wiltshire, was an English Member of Parliament.

He was a Member (MP) of the Parliament of England for Wilton in January 1377, February 1383, February 1388, January 1390, 1394, 1395 and 1399.

The last recorded mention of him was in 1412; his date of death is unknown.
