= William Herbert (British Army officer, died 1757) =

British Army officer and politician

Major-General William Herbert (c. 1696 – 31 March 1757) was a British Army officer and politician. He was the fifth son of Thomas Herbert, 8th Earl of Pembroke by his wife Margaret, daughter of Sir Robert Sawyer of Highclere.

== Biography ==
Herbert entered the Army on 1 May 1722 with a commission as lieutenant in the 1st Troop of Life Guards. In 1734 he was elected to Parliament for his family's seat of Wilton: he would represent the constituency for the rest of his life, supporting the Government. On 15 December 1738 he was promoted to captain in the 1st Regiment of Foot Guards, with the rank of lieutenant-colonel, and in 1740 he was made a groom of the bedchamber to the King and paymaster to the garrison at Gibraltar, offices he would hold until his death.

In 1745 Herbert was appointed aide-de-camp to the King, with brevet rank as a colonel, and in February 1747 he was made colonel of the 6th Regiment of Marines. On 1 December 1747 he transferred to the colonelcy of the 14th Regiment of Foot and on 27 January 1753 to that of the 2nd Dragoon Guards. He was promoted major-general in 1755.

William Herbert was married before 1741 to Catherine Elizabeth Tewes, of Aix-la-Chapelle. They had five children (three sons and two daughters), including Henry Herbert, 1st Earl of Carnarvon.

Parliament of Great Britain
| Preceded by Hon. Robert Sawyer Herbert; Thomas Martin | Member of Parliament for Wilton; 1734–1757; With: Hon. Robert Sawyer Herbert | Succeeded by Hon. Robert Sawyer Herbert; Hon. Nicholas Herbert |
Military offices
| Preceded by John Cotterell | Colonel of the 6th Regiment of Marines; 1747 | Succeeded by John Laforey |
| Preceded by John Price | Colonel of the 14th Regiment of Foot; 1747–1753 | Succeeded by Edward Braddock |
| Preceded by Sir John Ligonier | Colonel of the 2nd Dragoon Guards; 1753–1757 | Succeeded by Lord George Sackville |
