= William Chitterne =

Member of the Parliament of England

William Chitterne (died 1412/13), of Wilton, Wiltshire, was an English attorney and Member of Parliament.

He was a Member (MP) of the Parliament of England for Wilton in 1373, October 1383, November 1384, 1385, February 1388, January 1390, January 1397, 1399 and 1402. He was Mayor of Wilton in 1391–92.

He died at some point between February 1412 and December 1413.
