= Hervey-Bathurst baronets =

Baronetcy in the Baronetage of the United Kingdom

Escutcheon of the Hervey-Bathurst baronets

The Hervey-Bathurst baronetcy, of Lainston in the County of Southampton, is a title in the Baronetage of the United Kingdom. It was created on 7 December 1818 for Felton Hervey-Bathurst, with remainder, failing heirs male of his own, to the heirs male of his father. Hervey-Bathurst was the grandson of the Hon. Felton Hervey, seventh son of John Hervey, 1st Earl of Bristol, and served as an Aide-de-Camp to the Duke of Wellington after the Battle of Waterloo.

Born Felton Hervey, he had assumed by royal licence the additional surname of Bathurst in 1801. He was succeeded according to the special remainder by his next brother, the second Baronet.

The fourth Baronet sat as Conservative Member of Parliament for Wiltshire South. The fifth Baronet was a Major in the Grenadier Guards and fought in the Egypt campaign of 1898, in the Second Boer War and in the First World War, where he was awarded the Distinguished Service Order.

As of 2024, the baronetcy is held by the 8th baronet, who succeeded in 2011. As a male-line descendant of the first Earl of Bristol, he is also in remainder to this peerage, which is currently held by his kinsman Frederick Hervey.

== Hervey-Bathurst baronets, of Lainston (1818) ==
- Sir Felton Elwell Hervey-Bathurst, 1st Baronet (1782–1819)
- Sir Frederick Anne Hervey-Bathurst, 2nd Baronet (1783–1824)
- Sir Frederick Hutchinson Hervey-Bathurst, 3rd Baronet (1807–1881)
- Lt.-Col. Sir Frederick Thomas Arthur Hervey-Bathurst, 4th Baronet (1833–1900)
- Sir Frederick Edward William Hervey-Bathurst, 5th Baronet DSO, (1870–1956)
- Sir Frederick Peter Methuen Hervey-Bathurst, 6th Baronet (1903–1995)
- Sir (Frederick) John Charles Gordon Hervey-Bathurst, 7th Baronet (1934–2011)
- Sir Frederick William John Hervey-Bathurst, 8th Baronet (born 1965)

The heir apparent to the baronetcy is Frederick Benjamin Guy Hervey-Bathurst (born 1998), only son of the 8th Baronet.

== See also ==
- Marquess of Bristol

== Notes ==
Baronetage of the United Kingdom
Preceded by Gordon baronets	Hervey-Bathurst baronets of Lainston; 7 December 1818	Succeeded by Palmer-Acland baronets
