= South Wiltshire =

Former parliamentary constituency in the United Kingdom

- Former county constituency for the House of Commons

1832–1885
- Seats: two
- Replaced by: Devizes; Westbury; Wilton

South Wiltshire, formally known as the Southern division of Wiltshire or Wiltshire Southern was a county constituency in the county of Wiltshire in South West England. It returned two Members of Parliament to the House of Commons of the Parliament of the United Kingdom, elected by the bloc vote system.

The constituency was created under the Reform Act 1832 for the 1832 general election, and abolished under the Redistribution of Seats Act 1885 for the 1885 general election.

== Boundaries ==
1832–1885: The Hundreds of Kinwardstone, Heytesbury, Branch and Dole, Elstub and Everley, Amesbury, Warminster, Mere, South Damerham, Downton, Chalk, Dunworth, Cawden and Cadworth, Frustfield, Alderbury, Underditch, and Westbury.

== Members of Parliament ==
Election	1st Member	1st Party	2nd Member	2nd Party
1832	John Benett	Whig	Hon. Sidney Herbert	Tory
1834	John Benett	Whig	Hon. Sidney Herbert	Conservative
1846	John Benett	Whig	Hon. Sidney Herbert	Peelite
1852	William Wyndham	Whig	Hon. Sidney Herbert	Peelite
1859	Lord Henry Thynne	Conservative	Hon. Sidney Herbert	Liberal
1861 by-election	Lord Henry Thynne	Conservative	Frederick Hervey-Bathurst	Conservative
1865	Lord Henry Thynne	Conservative	Thomas Grove	Liberal
1874	Lord Henry Thynne	Conservative	Viscount Folkestone	Conservative
1885	constituency abolished			

== Election results ==
=== Elections in the 1830s ===
General election 1832: South Wiltshire
Party	Candidate	Votes	%
Tory	Sidney Herbert	Unopposed	
Whig	John Benett	Unopposed	
Registered electors		2,540	
Tory win (new seat)			
Whig win (new seat)			

General election 1835: South Wiltshire
Party	Candidate	Votes	%
Conservative	Sidney Herbert	Unopposed	
Whig	John Benett	Unopposed	
Registered electors		2,448	
Conservative hold			
Whig hold			

General election 1837: South Wiltshire
Party	Candidate	Votes	%
Conservative	Sidney Herbert	Unopposed	
Whig	John Benett	Unopposed	
Registered electors		2,962	
Conservative hold			
Whig hold			

=== Elections in the 1840s ===
General election 1841: South Wiltshire
Party	Candidate	Votes	%	±%
Conservative	Sidney Herbert	Unopposed		
Whig	John Benett	Unopposed		
Registered electors		2,280		
Conservative hold				
Whig hold				

Herbert was appointed Secretary at War, requiring a by-election.

By-election, 15 February 1845: South Wiltshire
Party	Candidate	Votes	%	±%
Conservative	Sidney Herbert	Unopposed		
Conservative hold				

General election 1847: South Wiltshire
Party	Candidate	Votes	%	±%
Peelite	Sidney Herbert	Unopposed		
Whig	John Benett	Unopposed		
Registered electors		2,710		
Peelite gain from Conservative				
Whig hold				

=== Elections in the 1850s ===
General election 1852: South Wiltshire
Party	Candidate	Votes	%	±%
Peelite	Sidney Herbert	1,550	39.5	N/A
Whig	William Wyndham	1,304	33.2	N/A
Conservative	Richard Penruddocke Long	1,074	27.3	N/A
Turnout		1,964 (est)	60.3 (est)	N/A
Registered electors		3,256		
Majority		246	6.3	N/A
Peelite hold		Swing	N/A	
Majority		230	5.9	N/A
Whig hold		Swing	N/A	

Herbert was appointed Secretary at War, requiring a by-election.

By-election, 11 January 1853: South Wiltshire
Party	Candidate	Votes	%	±%
Peelite	Sidney Herbert	Unopposed		
Peelite hold				

Herbert was appointed Secretary of State for the Colonies, requiring a by-election.

By-election, 15 February 1855: South Wiltshire
Party	Candidate	Votes	%	±%
Peelite	Sidney Herbert	Unopposed		
Peelite hold				

General election 1857: South Wiltshire
Party	Candidate	Votes	%	±%
Peelite	Sidney Herbert	1,517	35.9	−3.6
Whig	William Wyndham	1,445	34.2	+1.0
Conservative	Henry Thynne	1,269	30.0	+2.7
Turnout		2,116 (est)	65.3 (est)	+5.0
Registered electors		3,239		
Majority		72	1.7	−4.6
Peelite hold		Swing	−2.3	
Majority		176	4.2	−1.7
Whig hold		Swing	+2.3	

General election 1859: South Wiltshire
Party	Candidate	Votes	%	±%
Liberal	Sidney Herbert	Unopposed		
Conservative	Henry Thynne	Unopposed		
Registered electors		3,437		
Liberal hold				
Conservative gain from Liberal				

Herbert was appointed Secretary of State for War, requiring a by-election.

By-election, 29 June 1859: South Wiltshire
Party	Candidate	Votes	%	±%
Liberal	Sidney Herbert	Unopposed		
Liberal hold				

=== Elections in the 1860s ===
Herbert was elevated to the peerage, becoming Lord Herbert of Lea and causing a by-election.

By-election, 14 February 1861: South Wiltshire
Party	Candidate	Votes	%	±%
Conservative	Frederick Hervey-Bathurst	Unopposed		
Conservative gain from Liberal				

General election 1865: South Wiltshire
Party	Candidate	Votes	%	±%
Conservative	Henry Thynne	1,576	36.9	N/A
Liberal	Thomas Grove	1,427	33.4	N/A
Conservative	Frederick Hervey-Bathurst	1,270	29.7	N/A
Turnout		2,850 (est)	85.3 (est)	N/A
Registered electors		3,343		
Majority		149	3.5	N/A
Conservative hold		Swing	N/A	
Majority		157	3.7	N/A
Liberal hold		Swing	N/A	

General election 1868: South Wiltshire
Party	Candidate	Votes	%	±%
Conservative	Henry Thynne	Unopposed		
Liberal	Thomas Grove	Unopposed		
Registered electors		3,810		
Conservative hold				
Liberal hold				

=== Elections in the 1870s ===
General election 1874: South Wiltshire
Party	Candidate	Votes	%	±%
Conservative	Henry Thynne	2,115	41.1	N/A
Conservative	William Pleydell-Bouverie	1,977	38.5	N/A
Liberal	Thomas Grove	1,048	20.4	N/A
Majority		929	18.1	N/A
Turnout		3,094 (est)	78.6 (est)	N/A
Registered electors		3,938		
Conservative hold		Swing	N/A	
Conservative gain from Liberal		Swing	N/A	

Thynne was appointed Treasurer of the Household, requiring a by-election.

By-election, 4 Jan 1876: South Wiltshire
Party	Candidate	Votes	%	±%
Conservative	Henry Thynne	Unopposed		
Conservative hold				

=== Elections in the 1880s ===
General election 1880: South Wiltshire
Party	Candidate	Votes	%	±%
Conservative	William Pleydell-Bouverie	Unopposed		
Conservative	Henry Thynne	Unopposed		
Registered electors		3,789		
Conservative hold				
Conservative hold				

Pleydell-Bouverie was appointed Treasurer of the Household, requiring a by-election.

By-election, 3 July 1885: South Wiltshire
Party	Candidate	Votes	%	±%
Conservative	William Pleydell-Bouverie	Unopposed		
Conservative hold				

== Sources ==
- Leigh Rayment's Historical List of MPs – Constituencies beginning with "W" (part 4)
- Craig, F. W. S. (1989) [1977]. British parliamentary election results 1832–1885 (2nd ed.). Chichester: Parliamentary Research Services. pp. 482–483. ISBN 0-900178-26-4.
