= Wilton (constituency) =

Former parliamentary constituency in the United Kingdom

- Former county constituency for the House of Commons
- County: Wiltshire
- Major settlements: Wilton

1885–1918
- Seats: One
- Created from: South Wiltshire
- Replaced by: Salisbury and Westbury

1295–1885
- Seats: 1295–1832: Two; 1832–1885: One
- Type of constituency: Borough constituency

Wilton was the name of a parliamentary borough in Wiltshire. It was represented in the House of Commons of the Parliament of England from 1295 to 1707, then in the Parliament of Great Britain from 1707 to 1800 and finally in the House of Commons of the United Kingdom from 1801 to 1918. It had two Members of Parliament (MPs) until 1832, but from 1832 to 1885 only one member, as a result of the Reform Act 1832 where it also absorbed the former rotten borough of Old Sarum. In 1885 the borough was abolished, but the name of the constituency was then transferred to a new county constituency electing one Member from 1885 until 1918.

== Boundaries ==
1885–1918: The Borough of Salisbury, the Sessional Divisions of Amesbury, Hindon, and Salisbury, and the civil parishes of Figheldean, Fisherton-de-la-Mere, Milston, and Wily.

Stonehenge was within the constituency from 1885 until the seat disappeared in 1918, since when it has been in the Salisbury seat.

== Members of Parliament ==
=== Wilton borough ===
==== MPs 1295–1640 ====
Parliament	First member	Second member
1386	Thomas Cuttyng	Thomas Moleyns
1388 (Feb)	Thomas Cuttyng	William Chitterne
1388 (Sep)	Thomas Cuttyng	John Hulle
1390 (Jan)	Thomas Cuttyng	William Chitterne
1390 (Nov)		
1391		
1393	John Cole	Henry Bont
1394	Thomas Cuttyng	John Cole
1395	Thomas Cuttyng	John Hardy
1397 (Jan)	John Hardy	William Chitterne
1397 (Sep)	John Hardy	Thomas Cuttyng
1399	Thomas Cuttyng	William Chitterne
1401		
1402	John Bottenham	William Chitterne
1404 (Jan)		
1404 (Oct)		
1406	Robert Frye	John Hardy
1407	Robert Frye	Robert Lardiner
1410	Robert Frye	John Harleston
1411	Robert Frye	John Harleston
1413 (Feb)		
1413 (May)	Robert Frye	John Lambarde
1414 (Apr)	John Valeys	John Harleston
1414 (Nov)	John Harleston	John Whithorne
1415	John Harleston	John Whithorne
1416 (Mar)		
1416 (Oct)		
1417	John Harleston	John Whithorne
1419	John Harleston	John Whithorne
1420	John Harleston	John Whithorne
1421 (May)	John Harleston	John Whithorne
1421 (Dec)	John Harleston	John Whithorne
1510-1523	No names known	
1529	Geoffrey Pole	Edmund Knightley
1536	?	
1539	?	
1542	Sir Edward Bayntun	William Herbert
1545	Sir Thomas Lee	Christopher Willoughby
1547	Robert Watson	Robert Warner
1553 (Mar)	William Damsell	William Wightman
1553 (Oct)	Nicholas Chowne	Henry Creed
1554 (Apr)	William Clerke	Matthew Colthurst
1554 (Nov)	William Clerke	Henry Creed
1555	Henry Creed	William Clerke
1558	William Clerke	Henry Creed
1559	Henry Bodenham	Thomas Highgate
1562–3	William Wightman	Thomas Highgate
1571	William Wightman	Thomas Highgate
1572	William Clerke	Francis Vaughan
1584	John Penruddock	Roger Earthe
1586	Edward Penruddock	Henry Martyn
1588	Thomas Cavendish	Robert Penruddock
1593	Sir Thomas Morgan	Robert Penruddock
1597	Thomas Muffet	Robert Penruddock
1601	Sir Edmund Morgan	Hugh Sanford
1604-1611	Sir Thomas Edmonds	Hugh Sandford
1614	Sir Robert Sidney	Thomas Morgan
1621	Henry Nevill, 9th Baron Bergavenny ennobled 1622 replaced by Thomas Morgan	Sir Thomas Tracy
1624	Sir Thomas Morgan	Sir Percy Hobart
1625	Sir Thomas Morgan	Sir William Harrington
1626	Sir Thomas Morgan	Sir John Evelyn
1628	John Pooley	Sir Thomas Morgan
1629–1640	No Parliaments summoned	

==== MPs 1640–1832 ====
Year	First member	First party	Second member	Second party
April 1640	Sir Henry Vane (the elder)	Parliamentarian	Sir Benjamin Rudyerd	Parliamentarian
November 1640	Sir Henry Vane (the elder)	Parliamentarian	Sir Benjamin Rudyerd	Parliamentarian
December 1648	Sir Henry Vane (the elder)	Parliamentarian	Rudyerd excluded in Pride's Purge - seat vacant	
1653	Wilton was unrepresented in the Barebones Parliament and the First and Second Parliaments of the Protectorate			
January 1659	Richard Howe		Hon. John Herbert	
May 1659	Wilton was not represented in the restored Rump			
April 1660	Richard Howe		Francis Swanton	
April 1661	John Nicholas		Thomas Mompesson	
June 1661	John Berkenhead		Thomas Mompesson	
February 1679	Hon. Thomas Herbert		Thomas Penruddocke	
August 1679	Hon. Thomas Herbert		Sir John Nicholas	
1685	Oliver Nicholas		Sir John Nicholas	
1689	Thomas Penruddocke		Thomas Wyndham	
1690	Sir Richard Howe		Thomas Wyndham	
1695	John Hawles		John Gauntlett	
1698	Sir Henry Ashurst	Whig	John Gauntlett	
January 1701	Thomas Phipps		John Gauntlett	
November 1701	Sir Henry Ashurst	Whig	John Gauntlett	
July 1702	Sir John Hawles		George Boddington	
November 1702	Sir John Hawles		John Gauntlett	
1705	William Nicholas		John Gauntlett	
1708	Sir Lambert Blackwell		Charles Mompesson	
1710	John London		Charles Mompesson	
1711	Peter Bathurst		Charles Mompesson	
1713	John London		Thomas Pitt	
1722	Hon. Robert Sawyer Herbert		Thomas Pitt	
1727	Hon. Robert Sawyer Herbert		Thomas Martin	
1734	Hon. Robert Sawyer Herbert		Colonel the Hon. William Herbert	
1757	Hon. Robert Sawyer Herbert		Hon. Nicholas Herbert	
1768	Henry Herbert		Hon. Nicholas Herbert	
1775	Henry Herbert		Captain Charles Herbert	
1780	Lord Herbert	Tory	William Gerard Hamilton	Tory
1785	Lieutenant-Colonel Philip Goldsworthy	Tory	William Gerard Hamilton	Tory
1788	Lord Herbert	Tory	William Gerard Hamilton	Tory
1790	Lord Herbert	Tory	The Viscount FitzWilliam	Tory
1794	Major General Philip Goldsworthy	Tory	The Viscount FitzWilliam	Tory
1801	John Spencer	Tory	The Viscount FitzWilliam	Tory
1804	Ralph Sheldon	Tory	The Viscount FitzWilliam	Tory
1806	Ralph Sheldon	Tory	Captain the Hon. Charles Herbert	Tory
1807	Ralph Sheldon	Tory	Captain Charles Herbert	Tory
1816	Ralph Sheldon	Tory	Viscount FitzHarris	Tory
1821	John Penruddocke	Tory		
1823	John Penruddocke	Tory	Edward Baker	Tory
1830	John Penruddocke	Tory	Henry Bulwer	Tory
1831	John Penruddocke	Tory	James Dawkins	Tory
1832	Representation reduced to one member			

==== MPs 1832–1885 ====
Election	Member	Party
1832	John Penruddocke	Tory
1834	John Penruddocke	Conservative
1837	Edward Baker	Conservative
1841	James Harris	Conservative
1841 by-election	James Agar	Conservative
1847	James Agar	Peelite
1852	Charles A'Court	Peelite
1855 by-election	(Sir) Edmund Antrobus	Peelite
1859	(Sir) Edmund Antrobus	Liberal
1877 by-election	Hon. Sidney Herbert	Conservative
1885	Borough abolished - name transferred to county division	

=== Wiltshire, Southern or Wilton Division ===
==== MPs 1885–1918 ====
Year	Member	Party
1885	Sir Thomas Grove	Liberal
1886	Sir Thomas Grove	Liberal Unionist
1892	Jacob Pleydell-Bouverie	Conservative
1900	James Morrison	Conservative
1906	Levi Lapper Morse	Liberal
1910	Sir Charles Bathurst	Conservative
1918	Hugh Morrison	Unionist
1918	Constituency abolished	

== Election results ==
Decades:	1830s; 1840s; 1850s; 1860s; 1870s; 1880s; 1890s; 1900s; 1910s

=== Elections in the 1830s ===
General election 1830: Wilton
Party	Candidate	Votes	%
Tory	John Penruddocke	Unopposed	
Tory	Henry Bulwer	Unopposed	
Registered electors		c. 30	
Tory hold			
Tory hold			

General election 1831: Wilton
Party	Candidate	Votes	%
Tory	John Penruddocke	Unopposed	
Tory	James Dawkins	Unopposed	
Registered electors		c. 30	
Tory hold			
Tory hold			

General election 1832: Wilton
Party	Candidate	Votes	%
Tory	John Penruddocke	Unopposed	
Registered electors		204	
Tory hold			

General election 1835: Wilton
Party	Candidate	Votes	%
Conservative	John Penruddocke	Unopposed	
Registered electors		203	
Conservative hold			

General election 1837: Wilton
Party	Candidate	Votes	%
Conservative	Edward Baker	Unopposed	
Registered electors		210	
Conservative hold			

=== Elections in the 1840s ===
General election 1841: Wilton
Party	Candidate	Votes	%	±%
Conservative	James Harris	Unopposed		
Registered electors		194		
Conservative hold				

Harris succeeded to the peerage, becoming 3rd Earl of Malmesbury, causing a by-election.

By-election, 6 October 1841: Wilton
Party	Candidate	Votes	%	±%
Conservative	James Agar	Unopposed		
Registered electors		205		
Conservative hold				

General election 1847: Wilton
Party	Candidate	Votes	%	±%
Peelite	James Agar	Unopposed		
Registered electors		216		
Peelite gain from Conservative				

=== Elections in the 1850s ===
General election 1852: Wilton
Party	Candidate	Votes	%	±%
Peelite	Charles A'Court	125	82.8	N/A
Conservative	Jeremiah Greene Jones Greene	26	17.2	N/A
Majority		99	65.6	N/A
Turnout		151	70.3	N/A
Registered electors		219		
Peelite hold		Swing	N/A	

A'Court resigned after being appointed a Special Commissioner of Property and Income Tax in Ireland, causing a by-election.

By-election, 28 March 1855: Wilton
Party	Candidate	Votes	%	±%
Peelite	Edmund Antrobus	Unopposed		
Peelite hold				

General election 1857: Wilton
Party	Candidate	Votes	%	±%
Peelite	Edmund Antrobus	Unopposed		
Registered electors		251		
Peelite hold				

General election 1859: Wilton
Party	Candidate	Votes	%	±%
Liberal	Edmund Antrobus	Unopposed		
Registered electors		258		
Liberal hold				

=== Elections in the 1860s ===
General election 1865: Wilton
Party	Candidate	Votes	%	±%
Liberal	Edmund Antrobus	Unopposed		
Registered electors		265		
Liberal hold				

General election 1868: Wilton
Party	Candidate	Votes	%	±%
Liberal	Edmund Antrobus	Unopposed		
Registered electors		931		
Liberal hold				

=== Elections in the 1870s ===
General election 1874: Wilton
Party	Candidate	Votes	%	±%
Liberal	Edmund Antrobus	Unopposed		
Registered electors		1,040		
Liberal hold				

Antrobus resigned, causing a by-election.

1877 Wilton by-election
Party	Candidate	Votes	%	±%
Conservative	Sidney Herbert	751	80.1	New
Liberal	John Freeman Norris	187	19.9	N/A
Majority		564	60.2	N/A
Turnout		938	86.3	N/A
Registered electors		1,087		
Conservative gain from Liberal		Swing	N/A	

=== Elections in the 1880s ===
General election 1880: Wilton
Party	Candidate	Votes	%	±%
Conservative	Sidney Herbert	819	67.4	N/A
Lib-Lab	Joseph Arch	397	32.6	N/A
Majority		422	34.8	N/A
Turnout		1,216	86.8	N/A
Registered electors		1,401		
Conservative gain from Liberal		Swing	N/A	

Herbert was appointed a Lord Commissioner of the Treasury, requiring a by-election.

1885 Wilton by-election Wilton
Party	Candidate	Votes	%	±%
Conservative	Sidney Herbert	Unopposed		
Conservative hold				

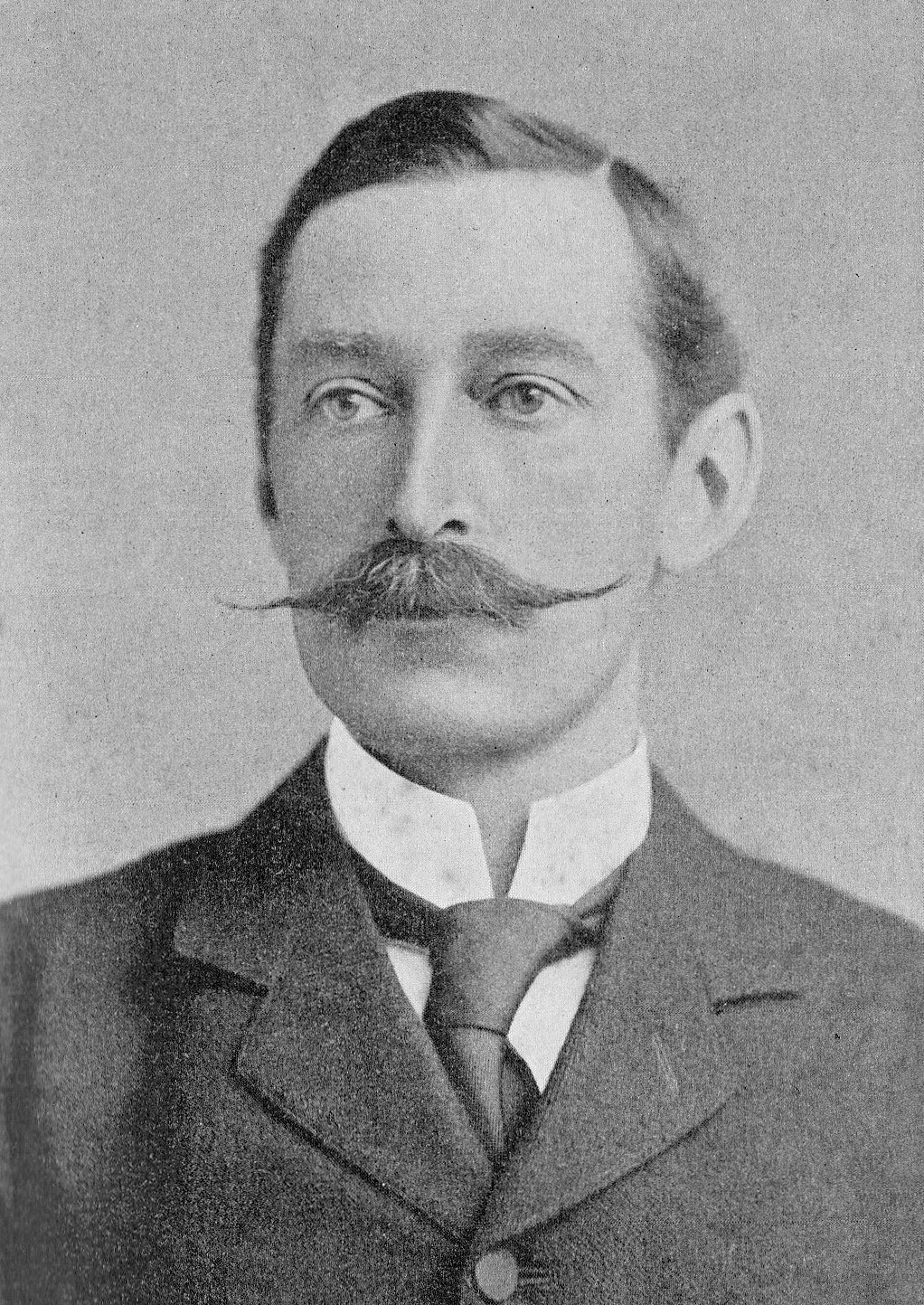
Herbert

General election 1885: Wilton
Party	Candidate	Votes	%	±%
Liberal	Thomas Grove	4,151	55.5	+22.9
Conservative	Sidney Herbert	3,329	44.5	−22.9
Majority		822	11.0	N/A
Turnout		7,480	86.2	−0.6
Registered electors		8,675		
Liberal gain from Conservative		Swing	+22.9	

General election 1886: Wilton
Party	Candidate	Votes	%	±%
Liberal Unionist	Thomas Grove	Unopposed		
Liberal Unionist gain from Liberal				

=== Elections in the 1890s ===
Folkestone

General election 1892: Wilton
Party	Candidate	Votes	%	±%
Conservative	Jacob Pleydell-Bouverie	3,743	52.9	N/A
Liberal	Thomas Grove	3,336	47.1	N/A
Majority		407	5.8	N/A
Turnout		7,079	79.1	N/A
Registered electors		8,951		
Conservative hold				

General election 1895: Wilton
Party	Candidate	Votes	%	±%
Conservative	Jacob Pleydell-Bouverie	3,828	51.8	−1.1
Liberal	Lionel Edward Pyke	3,565	48.2	+1.1
Majority		263	3.6	−2.2
Turnout		7,393	86.9	+7.8
Registered electors		8,511		
Conservative hold		Swing	-1.1	

=== Elections in the 1900s ===
1900 Wilton by-election
Party	Candidate	Votes	%	±%
Conservative	James Morrison	Unopposed		
Conservative hold				

General election 1900: Wilton
Party	Candidate	Votes	%	±%
Conservative	James Morrison	3,733	56.3	+4.5
Liberal	Martin White	2,892	43.7	−4.5
Majority		841	12.6	+9.0
Turnout		6,626	80.7	−6.2
Registered electors		8,205		
Conservative hold				

Morse

General election 1906: Wilton
Party	Candidate	Votes	%	±%
Liberal	Levi Lapper Morse	4,272	54.6	+10.9
Conservative	James Morrison	3,548	45.4	−10.9
Majority		724	9.2	N/A
Turnout		7,820	90.6	+9.9
Registered electors		8,632		
Liberal gain from Conservative		Swing	+10.9	

=== Elections in the 1910s ===
Verney

General election January 1910: Wilton
Party	Candidate	Votes	%	±%
Conservative	Charles Bathurst	4,541	53.8	+8.4
Liberal	Harry Verney	3,894	46.2	−8.4
Majority		647	7.6	N/A
Turnout		8,435	93.0	+2.4
Conservative gain from Liberal		Swing	+8.4	

General election December 1910: Wilton
Party	Candidate	Votes	%	±%
Conservative	Charles Bathurst	4,356	53.6	−0.2
Liberal	Francis Rogers	3,769	46.4	+0.2
Majority		587	7.2	−0.4
Turnout		8,125	89.6	−3.4
Conservative hold		Swing	-0.2	

General Election 1914–15:

Another General Election was required to take place before the end of 1915. The political parties had been making preparations for an election to take place and by July 1914, the following candidates had been selected;

- Unionist: Charles Bathurst
- Liberal: Charles Leach

1918 Wilton by-election
Party	Candidate	Votes	%	±%
Unionist	Hugh Morrison	Unopposed		
Unionist hold				
