= Hervey Tudway =

English cricketer

Personal information
- Full name: Hervey Robert Charles Tudway
- Born: 23 September 1888; Westminster, Middlesex, England
- Died: 18 November 1914 (aged 26); Boulogne, France

Domestic team information
- Years: Team
- 1910: Somerset

Career statistics
| Competition | First-class |
|---|---|
| Matches | 1 |
| Runs scored | 12 |
| Batting average | 6.00 |
| 100s/50s | 0/0 |
| Top score | 6 |
| Catches/stumpings | 0/– |
- Source: CricketArchive, 22 December 2015

Hervey Robert Charles Tudway (23 September 1888 – 18 November 1914) was a member of a long-established family from Wells, Somerset who played one first-class cricket match for Somerset in 1910. He was born at Westminster, London and died while serving as a lieutenant in the 2nd Battalion of the Grenadier Guards at Boulogne, France.

== Family and background ==
The Tudway family were prominent in Wells from the middle of the 18th century with wealth derived from sugar plantations in the West Indies, and a series of three family members served as the Member of Parliament for Wells from 1754 to 1830, with a further family member being MP for three years from 1852 to 1855. Hervey's father was Charles Tudway, who owned industrial and other property in and around Wells and who lived at Milton Lodge, Wells, where he created a spectacular garden on a hillside that is now regularly open to the public.

Hervey Tudway's mother, and the source of his first name, was Alice, who was the daughter of Sir Frederick Hervey-Bathurst, 4th Baronet and the granddaughter of Sir Frederick Hervey-Bathurst, 3rd Baronet, both of her ancestors being prominent cricket players.

== Cricket career ==
Tudway's career in first-class cricket was brief: he played in one match for Somerset against Hampshire in 1910, batting at No 8 and making six runs in each of the two innings. He did not bowl, and it is not known whether he batted right- or left-handed. The venue of Tudway's only first-class match, the Officers Club Services Ground, Aldershot may have reflected the fact that he was a serving army officer: his obituary in Wisden Cricketers' Almanack for 1915 records that he "played frequently for the Household Brigade".

== Army career ==
Tudway was commissioned as a probationary second lieutenant in the Grenadier Guards on 5 February 1908. Two years later, in February 1910, he was confirmed as a full second lieutenant. Later that same year, on 29 September 1910, he was promoted to lieutenant.

Tudway died of his wounds at Boulogne in the first months of the First World War. The 2nd Battalion of the Grenadier Guards was engaged in the First Battle of Ypres at this stage of the war. He is buried in the Boulogne Eastern Cemetery.
