= Jacob Pleydell-Bouverie, 6th Earl of Radnor =

British politician and army officer

The Right Honourable The Earl of Radnor CIE CBE
- Viscount Folkestone in 1895

Member of Parliament for Wilton
- In office 16 July 1892 – 3 June 1900
- Preceded by: Sir Thomas Grove
- Succeeded by: James Morrison

Personal details
- Born: 8 July 1868
- Died: 26 June 1930 (aged 61)
- Party: Conservative
- Spouse: Julian Eleanor Adelaide Balfour (m. 1891)
- Children: 10, including William
- Parent(s): William Pleydell-Bouverie, 5th Earl of Radnor; Helen Chaplin

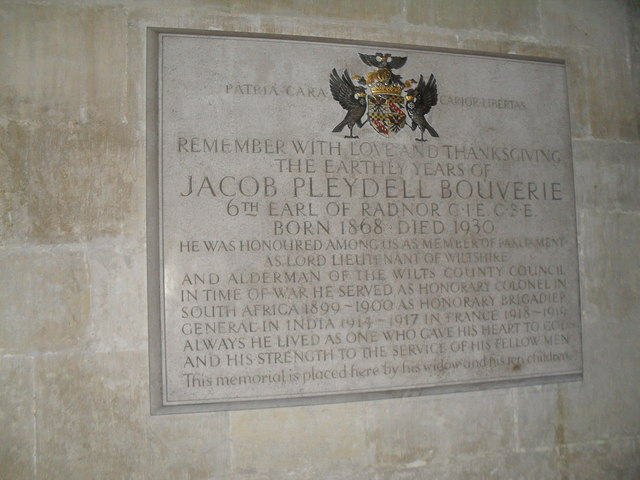
Monument to Jacob Pleydell-Bouverie in Salisbury Cathedral

Jacob Pleydell-Bouverie, 6th Earl of Radnor, CIE, CBE (8 July 1868 – 26 June 1930), styled Viscount Folkestone from 1889 to 1900, was a British Conservative Party politician and a British Army officer.

== Early life ==
Pleydell-Bouverie was the son of William Pleydell-Bouverie, 5th Earl of Radnor and Helen Matilda Chaplin. He was educated at Harrow School and Trinity College, Cambridge.

== Career ==
After two years' service as assistant private secretary to the Right Hon. Henry Chaplin, from 1890 to 1892, he was elected to the House of Commons at the 1892 general election as member of parliament for the Wilton division of Wiltshire, and held the seat until he succeeded to the peerage in 1900. In November 1901 he was elected Mayor of Folkestone for the following year, and when he vacated the office the following year he donated a sum equal to the salary to the Victoria Hospital. During his year as Mayor, he received the German Emperor Wilhelm II on his visit to Shorncliffe to inspect a cavalry regiment in November 1902.

Beyond political life, he was an officer in the 4th (Volunteer) Battalion, the Wiltshire Regiment. He saw active service in South Africa in 1900 when he volunteered to serve in a company attached to a regular battalion during the Second Boer War. Leaving Southampton for Cape Town in February 1900, he returned later the same year as he succeeded to the title on the death of his father. He was promoted to the rank of lieutenant-colonel and brevet colonel commanding the 4th Battalion, and later served in India from 1914 to 1917, where he was Brigadier-General of the Dehra Dun Brigade. In 1918 he was Director of Agricultural Production for the British Expeditionary Force.

He also chaired a royal commission on the Care and Control of the Feeble-Minded, between 1904 and 1908. On 27 June 1919, he was appointed a deputy lieutenant of Wiltshire.

Lord Radnor served as Governor of the French Hospital. Successive Earls of Radnor were governors of the hospital from the eighteenth century to 2015.

== Family ==
Before inheriting the earldom, Pleydell-Bouverie married Julian Eleanor Adelaide Balfour, daughter of Charles Balfour (himself great-grandson of Robert Balfour, 4th of Balbirnie and nephew of Robert Balfour, 6th of Balbirnie and Scottish nabob James Balfour), on 20 January 1891, and they had ten children:

- Lady Jeane Pleydell-Bouverie (23 March 1892 – 1976), married Maj. (George) Gerald Petherick (d. 1946) in 1914 and had issue.
- Lady Katherine Pleydell-Bouverie (16 May 1894 – 12 November 1961), married John Henry McNeile.
- William Pleydell-Bouverie, 7th Earl of Radnor (1895–1968)
- Lady Elizabeth Pleydell-Bouverie (27 June 1897 – 7 July 1982)
- Capt. Hon. Edward Pleydell-Bouverie (10 September 1899 – 7 May 1951), married Alice Pearl Crake, widow of 2nd Baron Montagu of Beaulieu, and had issue.
- Maj. Hon. Bartholomew Pleydell-Bouverie (6 April 1902 – 31 October 1965), married first Lady Doreen Clare Hely-Hutchinson, daughter of the 6th Earl of Donoughmore, and had issue and secondly Katharine Tod.
- Lady Margaret Pleydell-Bouverie (26 June 1903 – 17 September 2002), married Lt.-Col Gerald Barry and had issue.
- Hon. Anthony Pleydell-Bouverie (26 March 1905 – 25 June 1961), married Anita Estelle Costiander.
- Lady Helen Pleydell-Bouverie, OBE (2 January 1908 – 2003), married on 22 July 1931 Lt.-Col Hon. David John Smith, son of the 2nd Viscount Hambleden, and had issue.
- Hon. Peter Pleydell-Bouverie (19 October 1909 – 1981), married first Audrey Evelyn James and secondly Audrey Kidston and had issue by the latter.

== Coat of arms ==
Coat of arms of Jacob Pleydell-Bouverie, 6th Earl of Radnor
Coronet A coronet of an Earl Crest A demi-eagle with two heads displayed sable, ducally gorged or, and charged on the breast with a cross crosslet argent. Escutcheon Quarterly: 1st and 4th, per fesse or and argent, an eagle displayed, with two heads sable, on the breast an escutcheon gules, charged with a bend vair (Bouverie); 2nd and 3rd, argent a bend gules, guttée d’eau between two ravens sable, a chief checky, or and sable (Pleydell). Supporters Two eagles reguardant, wings elevated sable, ducally gorged or, each charged on the breast with a cross crosslet argent. Motto Patria cara carior libertas. (My country is dear, liberty is dearer.)

Parliament of the United Kingdom
Preceded by Sir Thomas Grove	Member of Parliament for Wilton; 1892 – 1900	Succeeded by James Archibald Morrison
Honorary titles
Preceded by The Viscount Long	Lord Lieutenant of Wiltshire; 1925–1930	Succeeded by Sir Ernest Wills, Bt
Peerage of Great Britain
Preceded by William Pleydell-Bouverie	Earl of Radnor; 1900–1930	Succeeded by William Pleydell-Bouverie
