= William Nicholas (MP) =

English politician (died 1749)

William Nicholas (c. 1668 – 27 December 1749) was an English politician. He sat as MP for Wilton from 1705 till 1708.

He was the third son of Sir John Nicholas and the brother of Edward Nicholas. He died unmarried.
