= Sir Frederick Hervey-Bathurst, 4th Baronet =

English cricketer and politician

The Right Honourable Lord Frederick Hervey-Bathurst MP

Member of Parliament for South Wiltshire
- In office 14 February 1861 – 24 July 1865
- Monarch: Victoria
- Prime Minister: Viscount Palmerston
- Preceded by: Sidney Herbert
- Succeeded by: Thomas Grove
- Majority: Unopposed

Personal details
- Born: 13 March 1833 London, England
- Died: 20 May 1900 (aged 67) Westminster, London, England
- Party: Conservative
- Spouse(s): Ada Ripton (1869–1900: his death)
- Children: 8
- Parent(s): Sir Frederick Hervey-Bathurst, 3rd Baronet; Lady Louisa Mary Smythe
- Cricket career

Personal information
- Height: 6 ft 3 in (1.91 m)

Domestic team information
- Years: Team
- 1852–1861: MCC
- 1861: Hampshire XI
- 1865–1866: Hampshire

Career statistics
Competition	First-class
Matches	13
Runs scored	187
Batting average	8.50
100s/50s	0/0
Top score	49
Balls bowled	60
Wickets	2
Bowling average	22.00
5 wickets in innings	0
10 wickets in match	0
Best bowling	1/17
Catches/stumpings	29/–
- Source: CricInfo, 8 May 2025

Sir Frederick Thomas Arthur Hervey-Bathurst, 4th Baronet (13 March 1833 – 20 May 1900) was an English first-class cricketer and Conservative politician. Hervey-Bathurst served in the British Army with the Grenadier Guards prior to his political career, serving with distinction in the Crimean War. He was elected a Conservative Party Member of Parliament for South Wiltshire in 1861, holding that political office until the 1865 general election. As a cricketer, he played first-class cricket for Hampshire and the Marylebone Cricket Club.

== Cricket, military and political careers ==
The son of Sir Frederick Hervey-Bathurst, 3rd Baronet, he was born at London in March 1833. He was educated at Eton College, where he played for the college cricket team. He would later become a founding member of the Eton Ramblers Cricket Club in 1862, and served as its first president. From there, he purchased a commission as an ensign and lieutenant in the Grenadier Guards in May 1851. A member of the Marylebone Cricket Club (MCC), he made his debut in first-class cricket for the MCC against Manchester in the same year as his army commission. He would play a handful of games for the MCC, prior to taking part in the Crimean War. There he saw action at Alma, Balaclava, and Inkerman and was promoted during the war to second captain in February 1854. He was later decorated for his war service by the Ottoman Empire with the Order of the Medjidie, 5th Class.

Upon his return from the war, Hervey-Bathurst returned to playing first-class cricket for the MCC, and was its president in 1857. He later played a first-class match for Hampshire against the MCC at Lord's in 1861. Following the death of Sidney Herbert in August 1861, the second seat for the South Wiltshire constituency became vacant. Hervey-Bathurst stood unopposed in the subsequent by-election and was returned as the second Member of Parliament for the constituency, with Lord Henry Thynne. His election to parliament necessitated his resignation from the Grenadier Guards, at which point he held the ranks of captain and lieutenant colonel, having purchased the ranks in January 1861. He held the seat until the 1865 general election, when he lost his seat to the Liberal Thomas Grove. Shortly after losing his seat, Hervey-Bathurst made two first-class appearances for the nascent Hampshire County Cricket Club, against Surrey at The Oval in 1865, and the MCC at Lord's in 1866. As a cricketer, he was described by Wisden as a "fine hard hitter" who made "capital on-drives". In thirteen first-class matches, he scored 187 runs at an average of 8.50, with a highest score of 49; with the ball, he took two wickets with his underarm bowling.

Following the death of his father in October 1881, Hervey-Bathurst succeeded him as the 4th Baronet of the Hervey-Bathurst baronets. Hervey-Bathurst died following a short illness at Westminster in May 1900. He was succeeded as the 5th Baronet by his son, Sir Frederick Hervey-Bathurst. Hailing from a cricketing family, his father played first-class cricket, as did his half-brother Lionel Hervey-Bathurst; his grandson, Hervey Tudway, would also play first-class cricket.

== Issue ==
He married Ada Ripton in 1869, who was the daughter of Sir John Sheppey Ribton, 3rd Baronet. The couple would have eight children, of whom five were boys and three were girls:

- Sir Frederick Edward William Hervey-Bathurst, 5th Baronet (11 February 1870 – 16 April 1956)
- Felton Rainald George Hervey-Bathurst (19 March 1871 – 2 March 1921)
- Algernon Richard Hervey-Bathurst (10 August 1872 – 4 June 1949)
- Cecilia Ada Hervey-Bathurst (14 October 1874 – 3 July 1959)
- Aline Beatrix Hervey-Bathurst (15 February 1877 – 3 July 1919)
- Violet Maude Hervey-Bathurst (30 March 1878 – August 1959)
- Bertrand Elwell Hervey-Bathurst (5 October 1882 – 31 December 1942), an officer in the Royal Northumberland Fusiliers
- Reginald Mervyn Hervey-Bathurst (21 February 1885 – 4 January 1905)

Parliament of the United Kingdom
Preceded by Hon. Sidney Herbert; Lord Henry Thynne	Member of Parliament for South Wiltshire; 1861 – 1865; With: Lord Henry Thynne	Succeeded by Lord Henry Thynne; Sir Thomas Grove, Bt
Baronetage of the United Kingdom
Preceded by Frederick Hervey-Bathurst	Baronet (of Larinston); 1881–1900	Succeeded by Frederick Edward William Hervey-Bathurst
