= William Pleydell-Bouverie, 5th Earl of Radnor =

British politician

The Right Honourable The Earl of Radnor PC
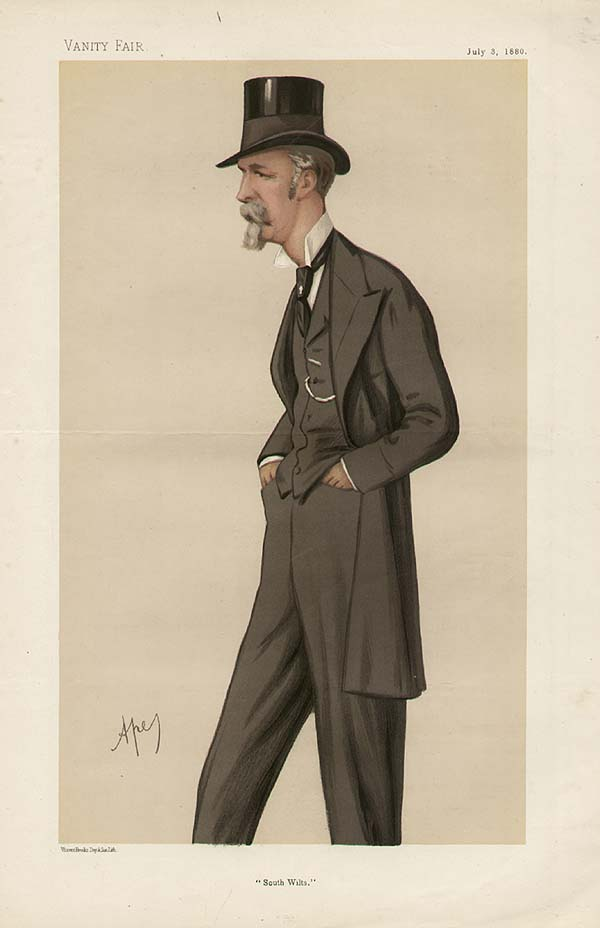
- "South Wilts". Caricature by Ape published in Vanity Fair in 1880.

Treasurer of the Household
- In office 27 June 1885 – 28 January 1886
- Monarch: Victoria
- Prime Minister: The Marquess of Salisbury
- Preceded by: The Earl of Breadalbane
- Succeeded by: The Earl of Elgin
- In office 5 August 1886 – 20 November 1891
- Monarch: Victoria
- Prime Minister: The Marquess of Salisbury
- Preceded by: The Earl of Elgin
- Succeeded by: Lord Walter Gordon-Lennox

Personal details
- Born: 19 June 1841
- Died: 3 June 1900 (aged 58)
- Party: Conservative
- Spouse: Helen Chaplin (m. 1866)
- Children: 4
- Parent(s): Jacob Pleydell-Bouverie, 4th Earl of Radnor; Lady Mary Grimston

William Pleydell-Bouverie, 5th Earl of Radnor PC (19 June 1841 – 3 June 1900), styled Viscount Folkestone from 1869 to 1889, was a British Conservative politician. He served as Treasurer of the Household under Lord Salisbury between 1885 and 1886 and again between 1886 and 1891.

== Background ==
Pleydell-Bouverie was the eldest son of Jacob Pleydell-Bouverie, 4th Earl of Radnor, by his wife Lady Mary Augusta Frederica Grimston, daughter of James Grimston, 1st Earl of Verulam. He became known by the courtesy title Viscount Folkestone when his father succeeded in the earldom of Radnor in 1869.

== Political career ==
Lord Folkestone was returned to parliament for South Wiltshire in 1874. When the Conservatives came to power in 1885 under Lord Salisbury, Folkestone was sworn of the Privy Council and appointed Treasurer of the Household. The South Wiltshire constituency was abolished in 1885 and at the general election of that year, Folkestone was instead returned for Enfield. He remained as Treasurer of the Household until the Liberals under Gladstone came to office in February 1886. Salisbury returned as prime minister already in August 1885, and Folkestone once again became Treasurer of the Household. In 1889 he succeeded his father in the earldom and entered the House of Lords. He continued as Treasurer of the Household until 1891.

Radnor became a director of the French Hospital in 1889 and served as governor from 1890 to 1900. Successive Earls of Radnor were governors of the hospital from the eighteenth century to 2015.

== Family ==
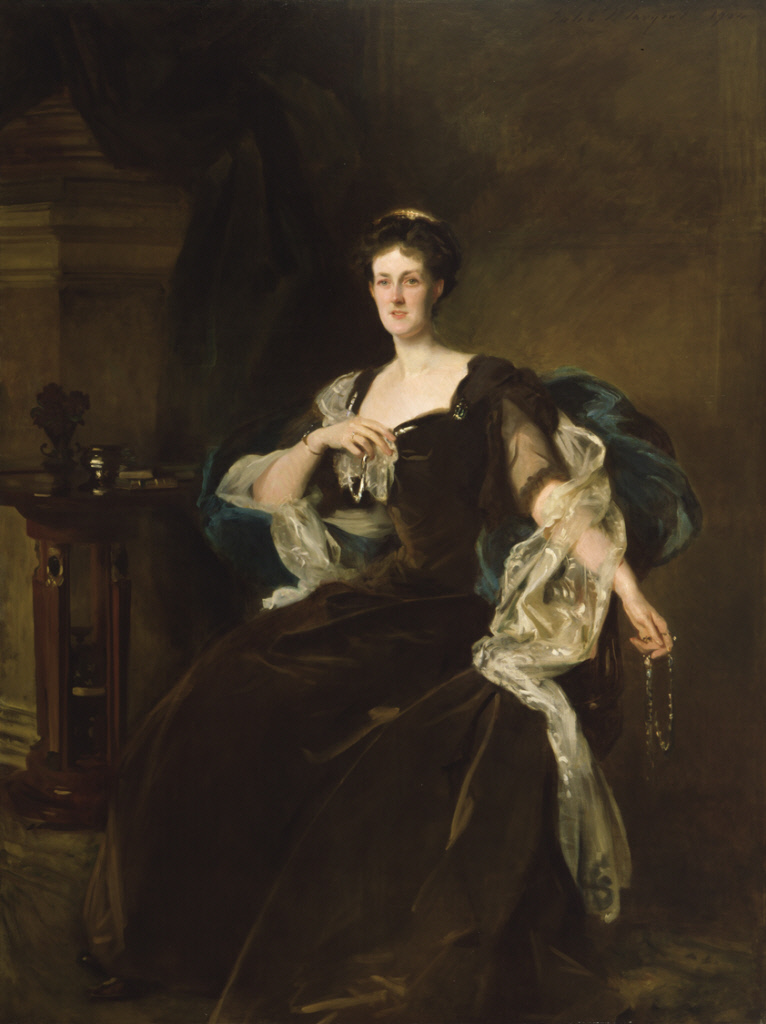
Portrait of his daughter, Wilma, Countess of Lathom, by John Singer Sargent, 1904

Lord Radnor married Helen Matilda Chaplin, daughter of Reverend Henry Chaplin and sister of Lord Chaplin, on 19 June 1866. They had four children:

- Hon. Helen Pleydell-Bouverie (19 March 1867 – 30 October 1877).
- Jacob Pleydell-Bouverie, 6th Earl of Radnor (8 July 1868 – 26 June 1930), married Julian Eleanor Adelaide Balfour and had issue.
- Lady Wilma Pleydell-Bouverie (16 September 1869 – 10 February 1931), married Edward Bootle-Wilbraham, 2nd Earl of Lathom. Wilma's name was a portmanteau of her parents' names, William and Matilda.
- Hon. Stuart Pleydell-Bouverie DSO, OBE (14 November 1877 – 6 April 1947), married Edith Dorothy Vickers and had issue.

Lord Radnor died in June 1900, aged 58, and was succeeded in the earldom by his eldest son, Jacob.

=== Helen, Lady Radnor ===
The Countess of Radnor was born in March 1846 and died in September 1929. She was a musician who in 1881 founded her own string orchestra for women players, initially Lady Folkestone's Band, then Lady Radnor's Band. Sir Hubert Parry wrote his famous Lady Radnor's Suite for her in 1894. She conducted its first performance that year.

== Coat of arms ==
Coat of arms of William Pleydell-Bouverie, 5th Earl of Radnor
Coronet A coronet of an Earl Crest A demi-eagle with two heads displayed sable, ducally gorged or, and charged on the breast with a cross crosslet argent. Escutcheon Quarterly: 1st and 4th, per fesse or and argent, an eagle displayed, with two heads sable, on the breast an escutcheon gules, charged with a bend vair (Bouverie); 2nd and 3rd, argent a bend gules, guttée d’eau between two ravens sable, a chief checky, or and sable (Pleydell). Supporters Two eagles reguardant, wings elevated sable, ducally gorged or, each charged on the breast with a cross crosslet argent. Motto Patria cara carior libertas. (My country is dear, liberty is dearer.)

Parliament of the United Kingdom
Preceded by Lord Henry Thynne; Sir Thomas Grove, Bt	Member of Parliament for South Wiltshire; 1874–1885; With: Lord Henry Thynne	constituency abolished
New constituency	Member of Parliament for Enfield; 1885–1889	Succeeded by Henry Bowles
Political offices
Preceded by The Earl of Breadalbane	Treasurer of the Household; 1885–1886	Succeeded by The Earl of Elgin
Preceded by The Earl of Elgin	Treasurer of the Household; 1886–1891	Succeeded by Lord Walter Gordon-Lennox
Peerage of Great Britain
Preceded by Jacob Bouverie	Earl of Radnor; 1889–1900	Succeeded by Jacob Pleydell-Bouverie
