= Walter Grove =

Walter Grove may refer to:

- Sir Walter John Grove, 2nd Baronet (1852-1932), of the Grove baronets
- Sir Walter Felipe Grove, 4th Baronet (1927-1974), of the Grove baronets

== See also ==
- Grove (surname)
