= Rotron Aerospace =

Rotron Aerospace Limited
- Type: Subsidiary
- Industry: Aerospace
- Founded: 2008
- Founder: Gilo Cardozo
- Headquarters: Semley, Wiltshire, United Kingdom
- Products: Aircraft engines
- Parent: Ondas Holdings
- Website: rotronaero.com

Rotron Aerospace (formerly Rotron Power) is a British aircraft engine manufacturer based in Semley, Wiltshire. The company specializes in the design and manufacture of Wankel engines for unmanned aerial vehicles, light aircraft and helicopters.

== History ==
The company was founded as Rotron Power in 2008 by Gilo Cardozo, who designed the company's first Wankel engine to power a paramotor flight over Mount Everest on 14 May 2007.

The name of the company was changed to Rotron Aerospace in September 2023.

In March 2026 Ondas Holdings, an American technology company, completed the acquisition of Rotron to expand its capabilities in unmanned aerial vehicles (UAVs).

== Products ==
Summary of aircraft engines built by Rotron Power:

- Rotron RT300
- Rotron RT600

The RT300 is a Wankel single-rotor design that produces 31 to 50 hp (23 to 37 kW), while the twin-rotor RT600 produces 53 to 100 hp (40 to 75 kW).

=== SkyLance one way effect system ===
The Skylance is one of three long-range strike or cruise-missile prototypes being tested under the UK government's Project Brakestop with the aim of providing missiles to Ukraine by the end of 2026. All weapons are to be made without any US-sourced components. The project requirements are for a missile that can be produced at a rate of 20 per month and a unit cost of about £400,000 excluding the warhead, which is expected to weigh 225 kg (496 lb).

Skylance has a range of up to 1,200 km (750 mi), a cruise speed of 600 km/h (370 mph) and a payload of up to 300 kg (660 lb).

Rotron successfully tested SkyLance in May 2026.
