= Sedgehill and Semley =

Civil parish in Wiltshire, England

Coordinates: 51°02′45″N 2°10′45″W

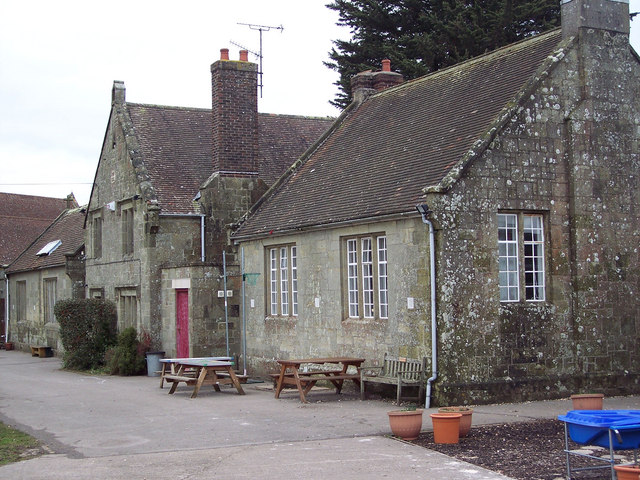
Semley Primary School

Sedgehill and Semley is a civil parish in the English county of Wiltshire, about 3 miles (4.8 km) north of the town of Shaftesbury on the main A350 road. It is in the southwest of Wiltshire and adjoins Dorset. The parish includes the villages of Sedgehill and Semley, and the hamlets of Barkers Hill (in the southeast, towards Donhead St Andrew) and Sem Hill (near Semley). The population of the parish at the 2021 census was 643.

The River Sem forms part of the northern boundary of the parish, and is fed by several streams which cross the parish in a generally northeasterly direction. The Sem joins the River Nadder in the northeast corner of the parish near Wardour, and the short eastern boundary of the parish follows the course of the Nadder.

== Governance ==
The parish was created in 1986 by combining formerly separate parishes. The parish elects a parish council. It is in the area of Wiltshire Council, a unitary authority, which is responsible for all significant local government functions.

For elections to Parliament, the parish is part of the Salisbury constituency.
