= Rotron RT600 =

Series of British aircraft engines

- Type: Aircraft engine
- National origin: United Kingdom
- Manufacturer: Rotron Power

The Rotron RT600 is a series of British aircraft engines, designed and produced by Rotron Power Ltd of Semley, Wiltshire for use in unmanned aerial vehicles, light aircraft and helicopters.

== Design and development ==
The engine is a dual-rotor Wankel engine, 600 cc (36.6 cu in) displacement, liquid-cooled, petroleum/jet fuel engine design. It can be employed direct-drive or with a toothed poly V belt reduction drive. It employs dual electronic ignition and produces 53 to 100 hp (40 to 75 kW) at 7500 rpm, depending on the model.

== Variants ==
RT600 Jet-A1
Model that runs on Jet A-1 fuel, with a compression ratio of 8.5:1 and produces 56 hp (42 kW) at 7500 rpm.
RT600 LCR
Model that runs on petroleum or avgas, with a compression ratio of 9.6:1 and produces 58 hp (43 kW) at 7500 rpm.
RT600 LCR-EXE
Model that runs on petroleum or avgas, with a compression ratio of 9.6:1 and produces 53 hp (40 kW) at 5000 rpm.
RT600 XE
Model that runs on petroleum, with a compression ratio of 9.5:1 and produces 100 hp (75 kW) at 7500 rpm.

== Specifications (Rotron RT600 Jet-A1) ==
Data from Tacke and manufacturer

=== General characteristics ===
- Type: Dual rotor aircraft engine
- Displacement: 600 cc (36.6 cu in)
- Length: 420 mm (16.5 in)
- Width: 170 mm (6.7 in)
- Height: 310 mm (12.2 in)
- Dry weight: 21.2 kg (46.7 lb) (block only)

=== Components ===
- Fuel type: Jet A-1
- Cooling system: liquid
- Reduction gear: direct drive or toothed poly V belt

=== Performance ===
- Power output: 56 hp (42 kW) at 7500 rpm for take-off, 52 hp (39 kW) at 6500 rpm continuous
- Compression ratio: 8.5:1

== See also ==
- Rotron RT300

Related lists

- List of aircraft engines
