= Geraldine Grove =

English aristocrat, diarist and essayist

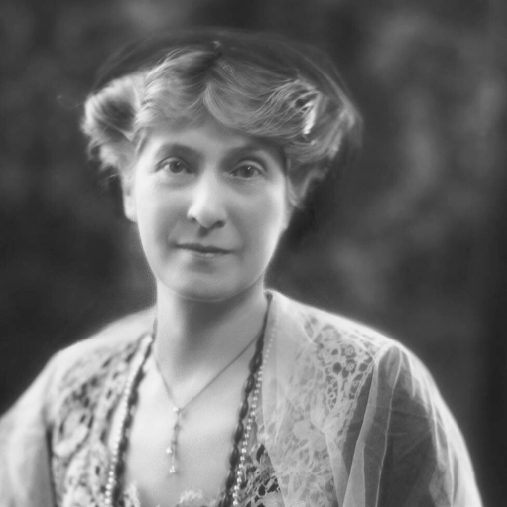
- crop, by Bassano Ltd in 1923
- Born: Agnes Geraldine Lane Fox; 25 July 1863
- Died: 7 December 1926 (aged 63); Wiltshire, England
- Education: Oxford High School
- Occupation: writer
- Spouse: (Sir) Walter John Grove
- Children: 5, including Gerald
- Parent(s): Lieutenant General Augustus Henry Lane-Fox and Alice Margaret (born Stanley)

Agnes Geraldine Grove born Agnes Geraldine Lane Fox also Agnes Geraldine Fox-Pitt; Lady Grove (25 July 1863 – 7 December 1926) was an English aristocrat, diarist and essayist. She wrote to support women's suffrage, anti-vivisection and anti-vaccination.

== Life ==
Grove was born in 1863. Her parents were Lieutenant General Augustus Henry Lane-Fox and Lady Alice Margaret Stanley (1828–1910), daughter of Edward Stanley, 2nd Baron Stanley of Alderley. Her elder brother was the electrical engineer St George Lane Fox-Pitt. Unlike her siblings, who were primarily educated at home, she went to Oxford High School.

After inheriting the Rushmore Estate in Dorset, of 29,000 acres (12,000 ha), from her father's cousin Horace Pitt-Rivers, 6th Baron Rivers, her father and her eldest brother took the name Fox Pitt-Rivers on 25 May 1880. She, like the other eight children in the family, took the name Fox-Pitt. Her use of the name was short-lived as in 1883 she married Walter John Grove. Assisted by her father's inheritance their honeymoon was extravagant, including a three month holiday in the USA where she met leading families such as the Vanderbilts and the Hewitts. She spent her time at social events on her return, living in Grosvenor Gardens but also returning to her home at Rushmore.

In 1879, she began one of her legacies which was a daily diary which she kept until her death. She was a supporter of women's suffrage and as an educated aristocrat she was invited to speak at meetings after she joined the movement in 1892. She wrote supportive pieces that were published in Cornhill Magazine and the Fortnightly Review. In 1895 she met and adopted Thomas Hardy as a mentor.

In 1897, her father-in-law, Sir Thomas Grove, 1st Baronet, died and she became Lady Grove of Ferne House. In 1900 she was in Paris where she spoke at the International Congress of Women. She and her husband had inherited several properties including Ferne House in 1897 but they sold it in 1902, using the money to maintain their lifestyle.

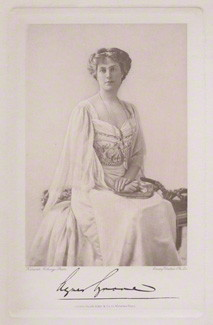
from the frontispiece of her book The Social Fetich in 1907

The first book she had published, in 1902, was titled 71 Days Camping in Morocco. Her book dealt with her opposition to Cunninghame Graham's book four years before on a similar subject. Due to her status and the foreign nature of North Africa to many citizens of Great Britain, Lady Grove was able to advertise her book in The Times, London. The following year she was employed at 10 guineas a month to write for the New Review. She was in favour of women's suffrage and objected to both vivisection and vaccination. On the latter issue, she was taken to court in 1905 for failing to get her son vaccinated. In 1907 her book The Social Fetich [sic] sold well. She was characterised as a "mystagogue" by G.K.Chesterton who although generally in favour of her views, derided her arguments because he said that she did not explain her views but made her readers "painfully conscious of not understanding".

Her favourite method is to terrify people from doing things that are quite harmless by telling them that if they do they are the kind of people who would do other things, equally harmless. If you ask after somebody's mother (or whatever it is), you are the kind of person who would have a pillow-case, or would not have a pillow-case.

In June 1905 she was summonsed to Bow Street Magistrates' Court by a London taxi driver for failing to pay the proper fare. The cabman had driven her from the King's Theatre in Hammersmith to her house at 51, Bedford Square - a distance which meant she should have paid five shillings. She paid only what she felt to be the proper fare - three shillings and 6 pence - and slammed the door in his face. She did not turn up to the court hearing and was ordered to pay the one shilling and six pence difference, as well as eight shillings of the cabman's costs.

In 1908, she published The Human Woman which dealt with women's citizenship; it included her speech in Paris in 1900. In 1910 she published On Fads.

Grove died at her home in Wiltshire in 1926 from tuberculosis, which had been diagnosed twenty years before. At the end of her life, her writings were dominated by the lack of money. An inheritance arrived in 1924 but it was almost all consumed in debts. Thomas Hardy wrote a poem "concerning Agnes" after her death. Her husband survived her. and her son Gerald Grove later became the third baronet.

== Family ==
Agnes Geraldine Fox-Pitt married in 1882 Walter John Grove, son of Sir Thomas Grove, 1st Baronet. The match encountered much opposition from Sir Thomas, who had in mind Walter marrying an heiress. The couple had five children, three sons and two daughters.

The sons were:

- Sir Gerald Grove, 3rd Baronet (1886–1962)
- Terence Grove (1893–1902)
- Walter Grove Peel (1904–1944). He married in 1926 Elena Rebecca Crosthwaite, daughter of Felipe Crosthwaite, who was a son of Philip Crosthwaite (Felipe) of San Diego and Rosarito, Baja California. The couple had three sons, before the marriage was dissolved in Mexico in 1933, the eldest son Walter Felipe being the heir presumptive to the baronetcy. While he succeeded the 3rd Baronet in 1962, he did not appear on the Official Roll.

The daughters were:

- Honor (1883–1944), a friend of Jean Rhys at the Academy of Dramatic Art.
- Oenone (1889–1956), unmarried, a Red Cross volunteer in 1917 who joined the Royal Air Force in 1918.

== Selected publications ==
=== Articles ===
- Grove, Agnes G. (1897). "Of Women in Assemblies". The New Century Review. 1 (3): 191–199. (reprinted in The Human Woman)
- Grove, Agnes (1900). "Women's suffrage in time of war". The Cornhill Magazine. 9 (50): 210–222.
- Grove, Agnes (1905). "The threatened re-subjection of woman". The Fortnightly Review. 78 (463): 123–128. (reprinted in The Human Woman)
- Grove, Agnes (1905). "The Three K's". The Nineteenth Century and After: A Monthly Review. 57 (340): 1031–1033. (reprinted in The Human Woman)
- Grove, A. (1906). "The Present Disabilities of the Women of England". The Fortnightly Review. 80 (475): 135–143. hathitrust online text (reprinted in The Human Woman)

=== Books ===
- Grove, Lady Agnes Geraldine (1902). Seventy-one Days' Camping in Morocco. LCCN 02024030.
- ———— (1908). The Human Woman. LCCN 09006507.
- ———— (1908). The Social Fetich (2nd ed.). LCCN 09024689.
