= Rotron RT300 =

British aircraft engines designed and produced by Rotron Power Ltd

- Type: Aircraft engine
- National origin: United Kingdom
- Manufacturer: Rotron Power

The Rotron RT300 is a series British aircraft engines, designed and produced by Rotron Power Ltd of Semley, Wiltshire for use in unmanned aerial vehicles, light aircraft and helicopters.

== Design and development ==
The engine is a single-rotor Wankel, 300 cc (18.3 cu in) displacement, liquid-cooled, petroleum/jet fuel engine design. It can be employed direct-drive or with a toothed poly V belt reduction drive. It employs dual electronic ignition and produces 31 to 50 hp (23 to 37 kW) at 7500 rpm, depending on the model.

== Variants ==
RT300 Jet-A1
Model that runs on Jet A-1 fuel, with a compression ratio of 8.5:1 and produces 31 hp (23 kW) at 7500 rpm.
RT300 LCR
Model that runs on petroleum or avgas, with a compression ratio of 9.6:1 and produces 32 hp (24 kW) at 7500 rpm.
RT300 XE
Model that runs on petroleum or avgas, with a compression ratio of 9.5:1 and produces 50 hp (37 kW) at 7500 rpm.

== Specifications (Rotron RT300 Jet-A1) ==
Data from Tacke and manufacturer

=== General characteristics ===
- Type: Single rotor aircraft engine
- Displacement: 300 cc (18.3 cu in)
- Length: 324 mm (12.8 in)
- Width: 170 mm (6.7 in)
- Height: 310 mm (12.2 in)
- Dry weight: 12.3 kg (27.1 lb) (block only)

=== Components ===
- Fuel type: Jet A-1
- Cooling system: liquid
- Reduction gear: direct drive or toothed poly V belt

=== Performance ===
- Power output: 31 hp (23 kW) at 7500 rpm for take-off, 28 hp (21 kW) at 6500 rpm continuous
- Compression ratio: 8.5:1

== See also ==
- Rotron RT600

Related lists

- List of aircraft engines
