= State Theatre (Sydney) =

Heritage-listed theatre in Sydney, Australia

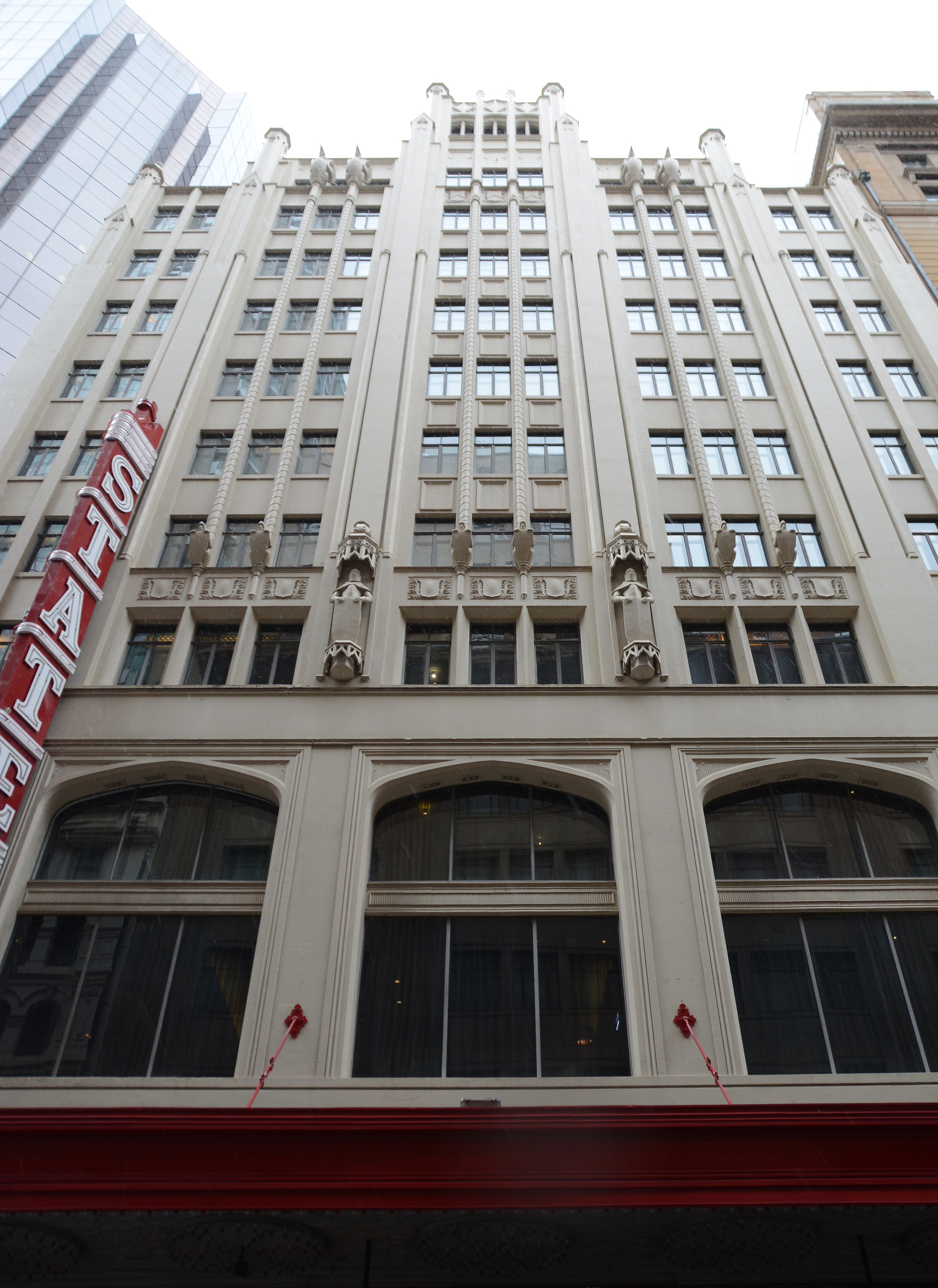
- Facade from Market Street

- Location within Sydney Location within Australia
- 33.8712°S 151.2074°E
- Location: 47–51 Market Street, Sydney, City of Sydney, New South Wales, Australia

History
- Design period: 1926
- Built: 1926–1929
- Built for: Union Theatres

Site notes
- Height: 56.8 m (186 ft)
- Area: 2,516 m^{2} (27,080 sq ft)
- Architect(s): Henry Eli White, John Eberson
- Architectural styles: Modern Gothic, Neoclassical, Baroque, Art Deco and French Empire
- Owner: EVT Limited

New South Wales Heritage Register
- Official name: State Theatre; State Building; Wurlitzer Organ
- Type: State heritage (built)
- Designated: 2 April 1999
- Reference no.: 446
- Type: Theatre
- Category: Recreation and Entertainment
- Builders: John Grant and Sons

The State Theatre is a 2,034 seat heritage listed theatre located at 47–51 Market Street, in the Sydney central business district in the City of Sydney local government area of New South Wales, Australia. The theatre was designed by Henry Eli White with assistance from John Eberson and built between 1926 and 1929. It hosts film screenings, live theatre and musical performances, and since 1974 it has been the home of the annual Sydney Film Festival. It is also known as State Building and Wurlitzer Organ. The property is privately owned. It was added to the New South Wales State Heritage Register on 2 April 1999.

The State Theatre is a tiered and raked theatre with a proscenium arch and a maximum seating capacity of 2034 seats. The seating is arranged with 828 seats in the Stalls at stage level, 426 in the Mezzanine Lounge and 780 seats in the Dress Circle (upper most level).

== History ==
=== Design ===
The theatre was designed by the eminent Sydney based, New Zealand born theatre architect Henry White, the designer of some 120 theatres in Australia and New Zealand. It remains as a rare and pre-eminent example of his firm's work. The design of the State Theatre, with its fly-tower stages, was based on original design ideas produced by the Chicago–based American theatre architect John Eberson in co-operation with local architect Henry White. After visiting the US to see Eberson's work, White was able to eliminate all columns supporting the upper balconies and the interior also reflecting the American's influence.

=== Construction ===
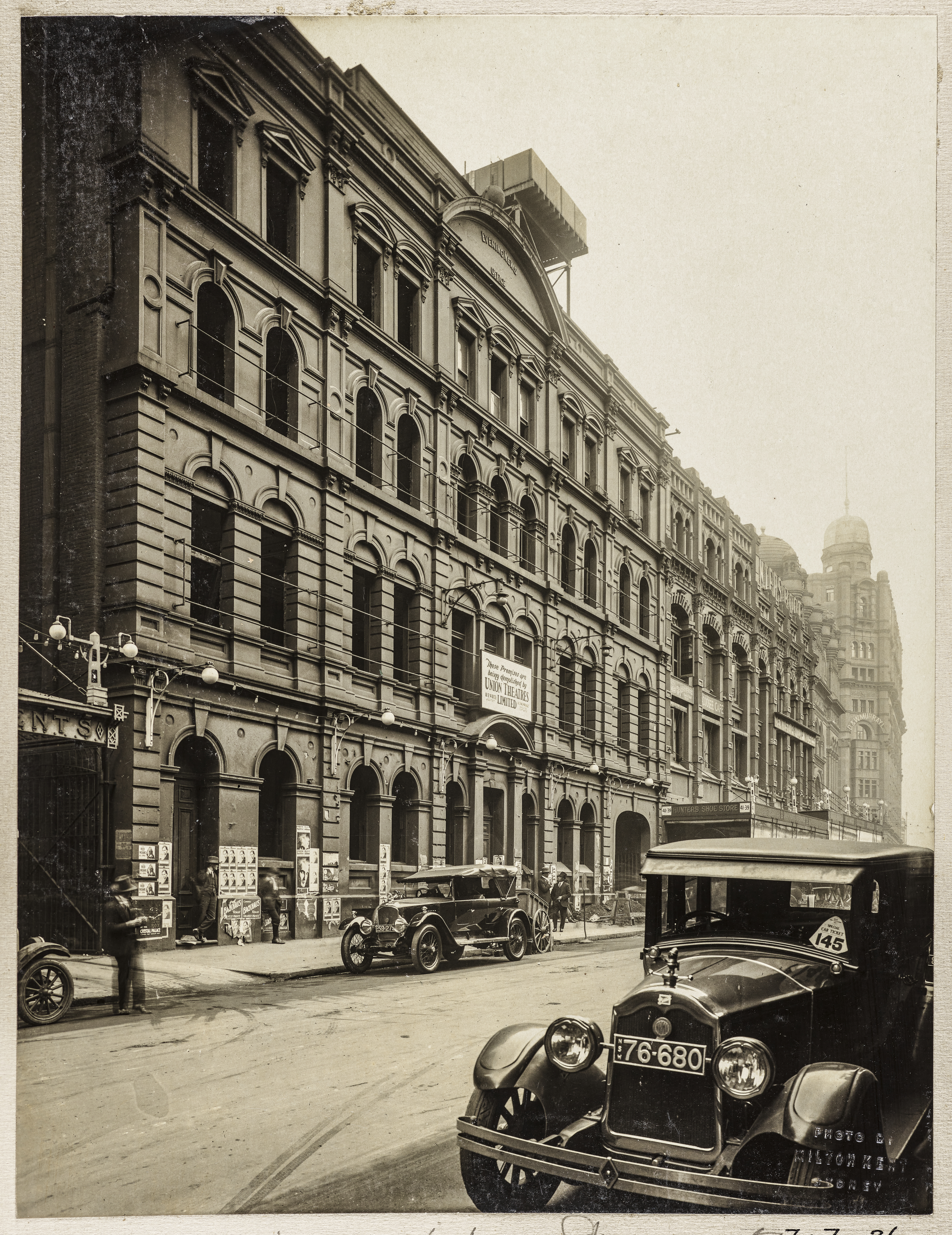
The Evening News building at 47 Market Street before being demolished to make way for the State Theatre, 1926.

The Union Theatres company purchased the site in 1926, the location of the former offices of The Evening News newspaper. Construction of the State Theatre commenced the following year in 1927 with an estimated construction budget of £400,000. The project proposed a grand new theatre with 12 floors of retail above and included two basements on what was then described as a 'valuable city site'. The site area of 2516m² (27092 square feet) was excavated to a depth of 14.6m (47 feet) below footpath level, and 2300m³ (2988 cubic yards) of stone and soil removed to create the theatre volume and basement spaces. The building reached a height of 56.8m (186½ feet). The construction used almost one million bricks, 60 tons of lime mortar, 2300 tons of Portland cement, 2500 tons of construction steel, and 35,000 pieces of oregon timber. By the time construction was completed the building costs had increased by two and half times reaching almost £1,000,000 or $94 million in 2023 terms.

=== Opening ===
The State Theatre opened on 7 June 1929. The theatre was envisioned by Stuart Doyle, owner of Union Theatres and the architect Henry White. It was to be seen as 'The Empire's Greatest Theatre' and was designed as a picture palace when such monuments to movies were seen at their grandest and most spectacular. During its first week patrons were offered 'entertainment of unparalleled magnificence'. The opening night's performance featured noted bandleader Will Prior who was described in the program as a conductor capable of lifting 'jazz to perfection in a sublime miscellany of melodious rhythm'. The theatre opened with the Ernst Lubitsch film The Patriot on 7 June 1929, accompanied by Price Dunlavy billed as a 'debonair genius' playing on the Wurlitzer organ.

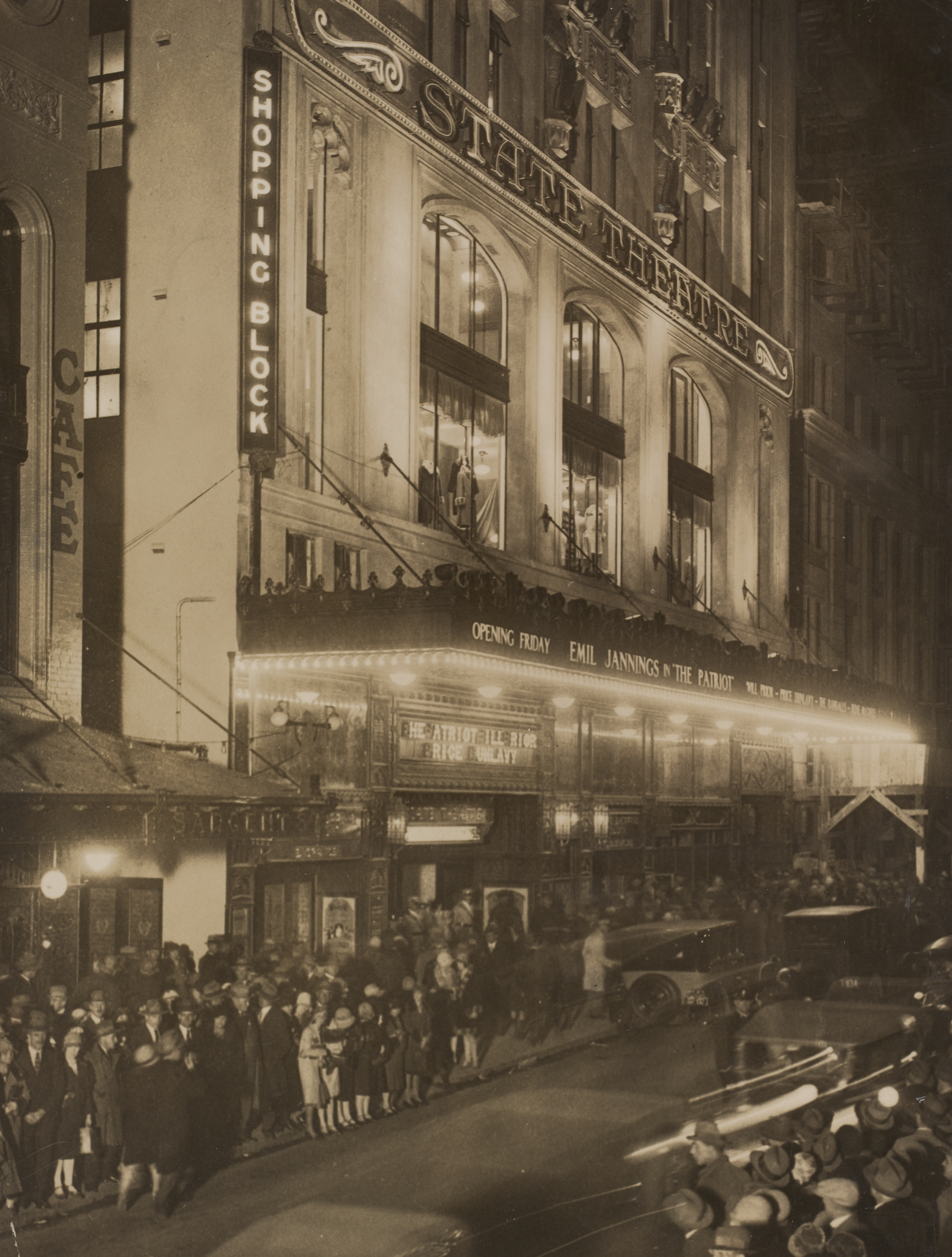
Opening night lights on Market Street, June 1929

Originally seating approximately 2,572 patrons, it was never as large as its namesake, the 3,371 seat State Theatre that opened four months earlier on 23 February 1929 in Melbourne. However, it was much more ornate, having been elaborately designed by Sydney architect Henry Eli White, who based his work on that of American theatre architect John Eberson, and was invited to work with him on this theatre in Australia. The theatre building has Gothic-style street facades and an elaborate late Gothic street lobby complete with fan vaulting, a Neoclassical domed stairhall, elaborately detailed foyers and lobbies, while the main auditorium is a richly detailed Baroque styled space with three tiers of seating and a coffered domed ceiling.

The first sound film screened was Paramount's A Dangerous Woman on 29 June 1929. The last all silent film screened (before later revivals) was United Artists' Evangeline on 6 December 1929. A 1929 Union Theatres advertisement for the 'all talking' Woman Trap and silent film Evangeline also promoted the additional entertainment provided including Will Prior’s State Band, 'The Radio Idea' featuring Marino and Mona, John Warren and the State Beauty Ballet, and Price Dunlavy known as the 'Wurlitzer Wizard'. Cheaper early morning sessions were offered and special State Concession weeknight prices were listed for different seating areas; Back Dress Circle 3s/3d ($15.30), Unreserved Circle 4s/4d ($20.35), Reserved Circle 5s/5d ($25.45), Royal Mezzanine Lounge Unreserved 4s/4d ($20.35) and Reserved 5s/5d ($25.45), [2023 equivalent prices shown in brackets].

=== The Depression and change of ownership ===
Only two years after opening the State, Union Theatres was feeling the financial impacts of the Depression across its cinema chain and was liquidated in November 1931 for accumulated debts and interest, and purchased soon after by Greater Union Theatres Limited who have remained continuous owners of the State Theatre property. Greater Union was later known as Amalgamated Holdings Limited (AHL), Event and now EVT Limited but is essentially the same company.

=== Newsreels and World War II ===
A newsreel theatre, the first in Australia, was opened in the basement of the building in 1932. It later became a screening room. Other attractions included Australian soprano Rene Maxwell and the State Beauty Ballet billed as 'a beauty bevy with amazing ability'. The stage had then been set for many performers and films to transport and entertain future customers. After providing an outlet and a venue for entertainment during the Great Depression of the 1930s, the next decade saw the events of World War II. Leading up to and during the war, patrons were able to view the latest news through the theatre's regular screenings of the Movietone News. The State played its part by continuing to provide an escape for all those directly and indirectly involved in the conflict, with films starring actors such as Cary Grant, Ronald Colman and Joan Crawford.

=== After World War II ===
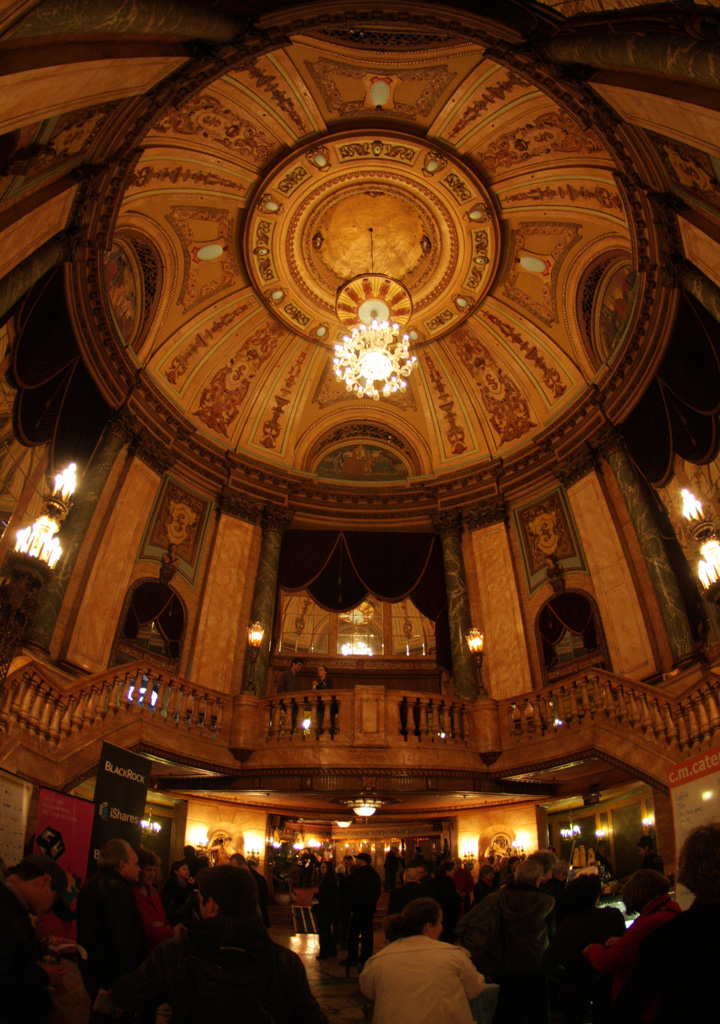
The State Theatre stairhall

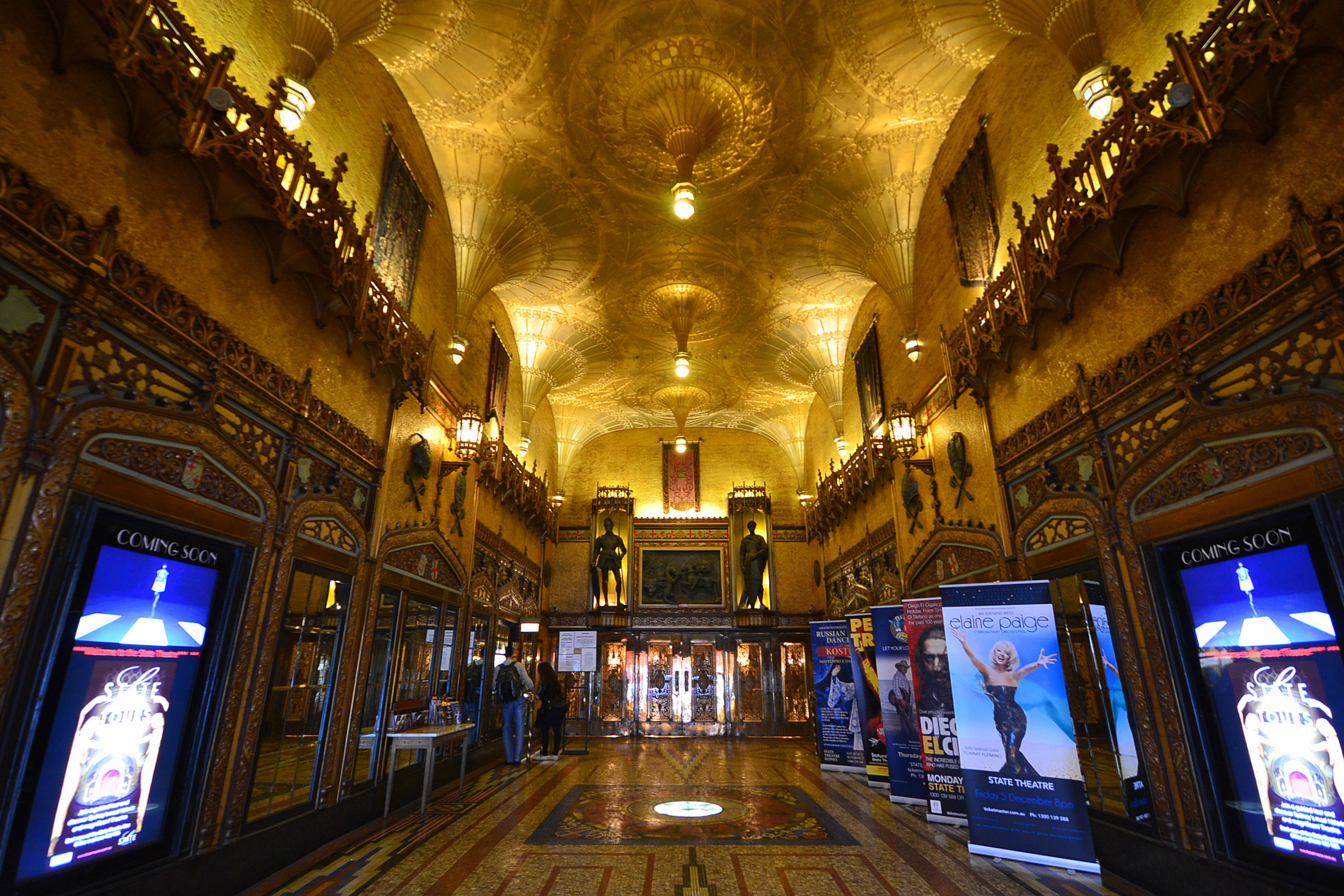
The State Theatre street lobby

After the end of the war in 1945, the State once again became the place where Sydneysiders were entertained. The 1950s saw the beginning of Australian multiculturalism with the first waves of post-war immigration. Increasing affluence and economic stability fuelled rapid expansion of new outer lying suburbs and helped to create the so-called 'baby boom' generation. As television was far from an everyday household item, audiences still visited the State to watch live and filmed entertainment. A new generation of Hollywood and local actors appeared on screens during this decade which maintained interest in cinema. Film attractions included James Stewart in Bend of the River in 1952 and Virginia McKenna starring in an adaptation of Neville Shute classic book A Town Like Alice in 1956.

The 1960s saw Australia in a period of radical change reflected in the growth of pop culture and increasing opposition to the Vietnam War, which mirrored social upheaval worldwide. In times of change, people often look to entertainment as a release and again the State Theatre provided the outlet. The changing times are reflected in the films on offer which in 1960 included Yul Bryner in Once More, with Feeling! while by 1969 the sexual farce Can Heironymus Merkin Ever Forget Mercy Humppe and Find True Happiness? was being shown.

=== 1970s and Sydney Film Festival venue ===
The growing of permissiveness in 1970s Australian society and the rejection of more 'traditional values' is seen in the anti-censorship demonstrations surrounding the film Medium Cool. In terms of film entertainment, the increasing penetration of television into Australian homes during the late 1960s and early 1970s saw filmmakers turn towards the Hollywood 'blockbuster' as a means of returning audiences to the cinema. Such films included blockbusters like The Godfather and Jaws. The State Theatre often held premieres of blockbusters in the 1960s and 1970s, one of the most successful was Count Yorga, Vampire. a low budget horror movie, which was such a hit to the extent that, as one newspaper reported, police had to be brought in to control the crowds in Market Street.

In 1974 the State first hosted the Sydney Film Festival, where it has remained ever since, using the theatre in cinema mode for two to three weeks every June.

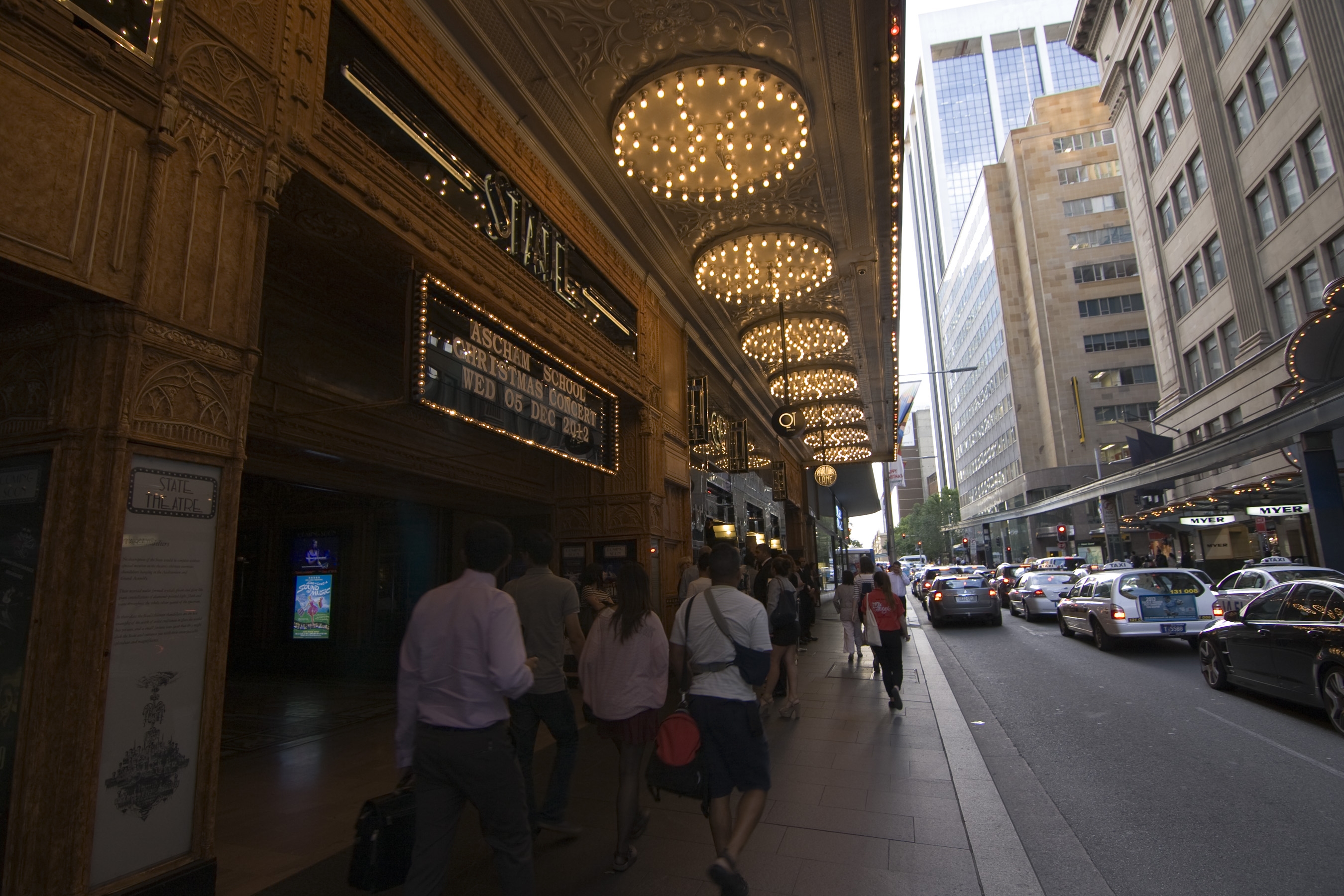
The theatre from the outside

=== Live theatre and musical performances ===
The 1980s were a time of significant change for the State Theatre. After a noteworthy restoration of its facilities, the State reopened in 1980 with Bette Midler starring in the concert film Divine Madness. Two years earlier the 'Divine Ms M' had in person, enjoyed a series of triumphant live concerts at the theatre. On the screen, E.T. the Extra-Terrestrial, came to earth in 1982 and made a home at the State. This decade saw the State Theatre return to its more traditional roots with numerous live acts and musical theatre performances.

Like many cities, Sydney has lost many historic live music venues as property developers converted them to commercial and residential uses. However the State Theatre has continued to be among the premier venues, a position reinforced with additional renovations undertaken in the early 1990s. Full theatrical runs were undertaken with stage musicals such as Evita, Jesus Christ Superstar, The Secret Garden and Anything Goes. Live performance returned from the 1990s, with acts such as Rudolph Nureyev, Shirley MacLaine, Shirley Bassey, Whoopi Goldberg, and Harry Connick Jr. Other major musical artists to have played at the State Theatre include; Prince, Bob Dylan, Morrissey, Nick Cave, Norah Jones, Sufjan Stevens, k.d. lang, Elvis Costello, Jimmy Barnes and Chris Isaak.

=== 2012 expansion plans ===
In 2012 plans were revealed for a $32 million renovation of the theatre to create an orchestra pit and increase the backstage area to improve the theatre's capability for live performances as a lyric theatre. The plan failed to proceed after the theatre owners did not acquire the retail building located adjacent the stage that would have allowed expansion to the west. The theatre owners later purchased the adjoining property 'Dudley House' a seven-storey building at 468−472 George Street and the neighbouring three-storey building at 458−466 George Street, formerly the Globe Theatre, built in 1915. The buildings were acquired by Event (now EVT) in 2017 for a price of $116 million. These purchases in addition to the earlier purchase of the adjacent Gowings Building in 2006 for $68.6 million have created a consolidated site of around 4700 m² under single ownership increasing options for future improvements and additions to the theatre.

== Description ==
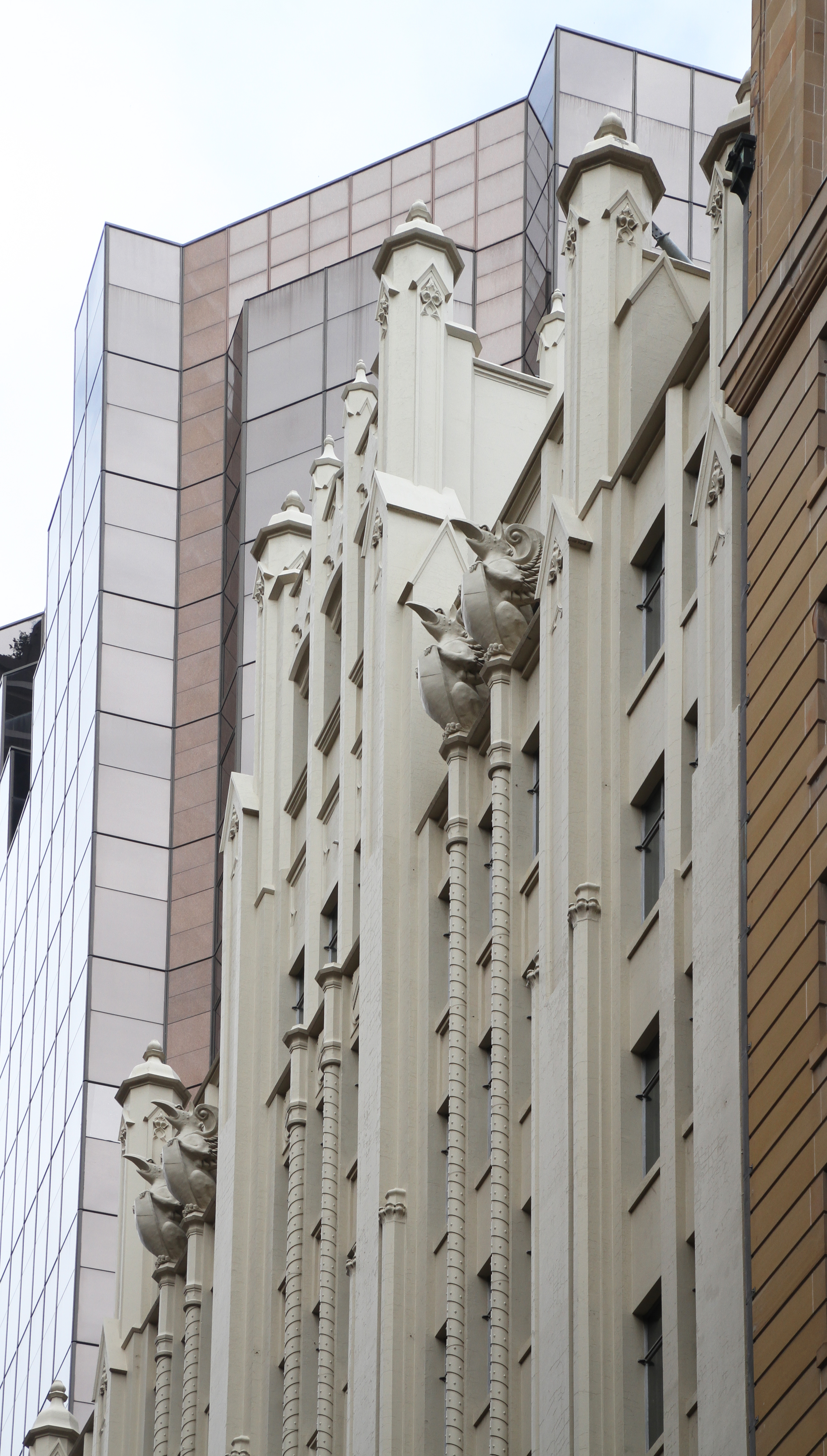
The upper facade

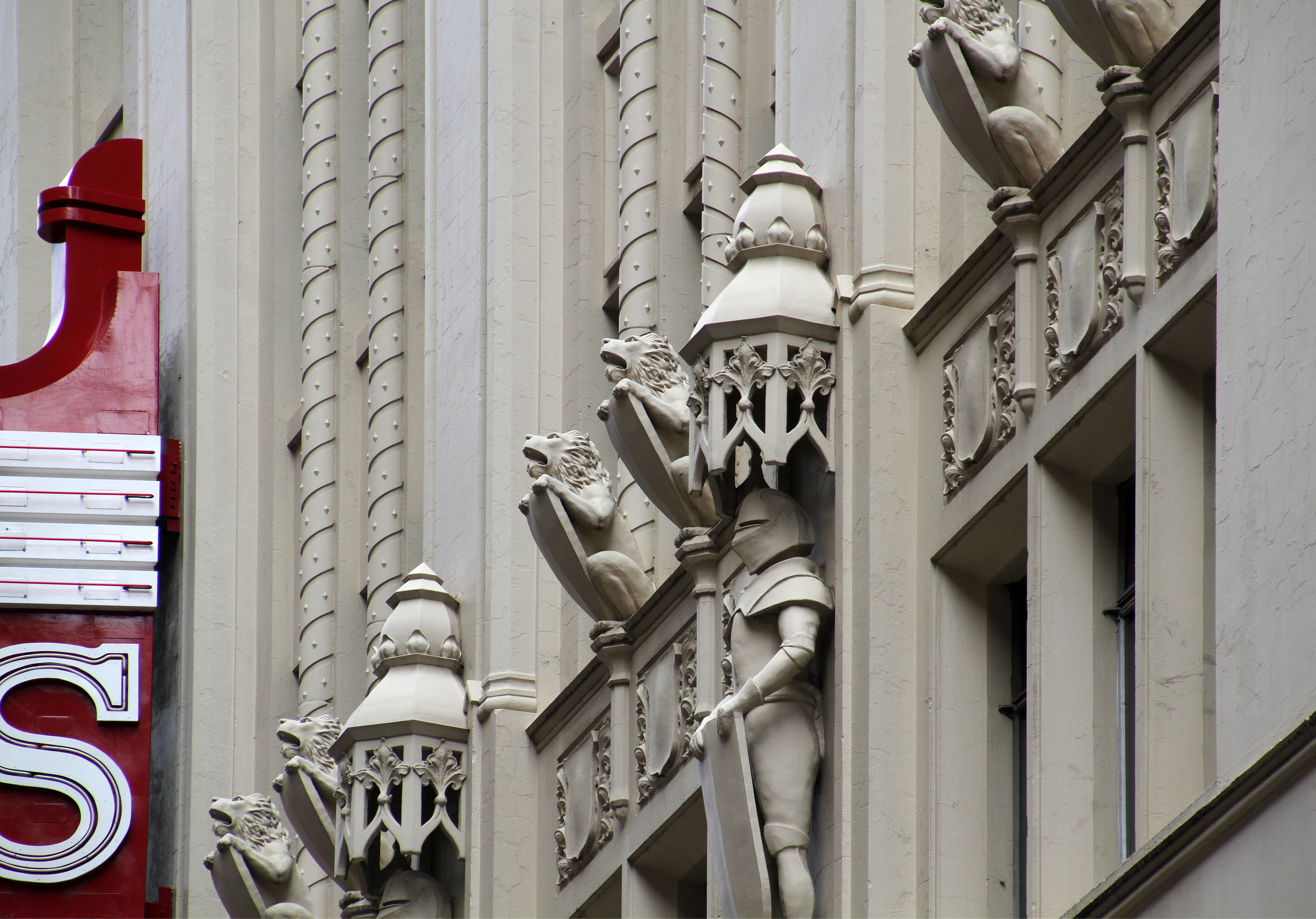
Gothic detailing

The architectural and spatial progression from gothic imagery on the street frontage, through the 14th century Gothic Hall and Robert Adam inspired Empire Room to the Baroque drama of the Rotunda and French Empire decorated foyers into the splendour of the main auditorium is an experience unparalleled in any 19th- or 20th-century building in New South Wales. Conservation works in the 1980s have recaptured and refreshed the incredible nature of this composition. The adoption of individual historical themes and architectural imagery for each of the spacious anterooms and lobbies to the public toilets is an unusual and highly attractive device.

The gothic interior design themes and detailing of the Shopping Block, carried from the ground floor lift foyer into the adjacent retail display areas and upper level spaces was of the highest quality and unique as a treatment for a retailing precinct in Sydney. Extensive evidence of this detailing survives in certain areas of the Shopping Block building, particularly the ground floor lift lobby, with its glazed display cabinets.

The 1937 Market Street shop front alterations were, at the time of their installation, a fine example of the Art Deco style of decoration, executed at a time when the Shopping Block was thought to need a radical new image to counter flagging consumer support. Unfortunately the alterations of latter decades have adversely impacted on the quality and integrity of this decoration.

The lavish shopfront decoration, extensive illumination and extravagant event promotion signage all contribute greatly to the richness of the Market Street streetscape in the immediate vicinity.

The interior fitout of the small café, most of which dates from the mid-1990s, is a good example of contemporary Art Deco revival but retains important elements, particularly the gothic ceilings and mosaic floor tiling of the original decoration.

The State Theatrette was a popular place for the public screening of newsreels and special film features before the time of television. Many thousands of people were thrilled, entertained, informed or shocked by world and national news items that were first seen at such newsreel screenings.

The State Ballroom was a popular venue for many decades, at a time when Sydney was renowned for its major ballrooms. The Shopping Block, as first opened, was a popular retail venue until it was overtaken by wider consumer shopping patterns in such places as Department Stores.

The Theatre was the scene of one of the great conservation battles in the early 1970s, at a time when much of historic Sydney was being demolished for commercial redevelopment. Its retention and protection under the NSW Heritage Act reflect the widespread community esteem. The State Theatre, with its central city location and strong history, is a widely known and popular entertainment facility in Sydney society. The small café has been a popular meeting place for many decades and serves to enliven the streetscape in the immediate vicinity.

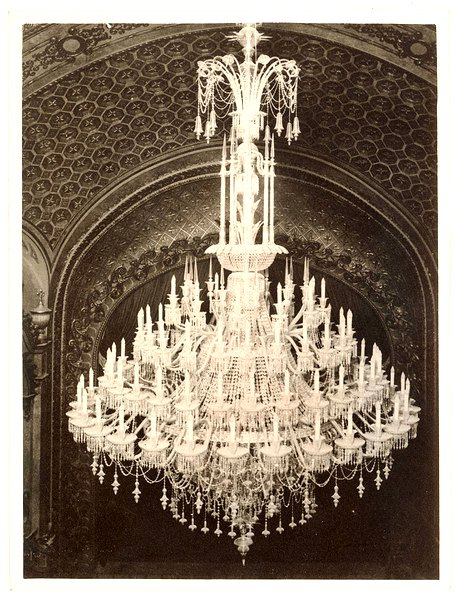
Koh-i-noor Chandelier

The State Theatre contains a 21 Rank Wurlitzer organ, one of three, with the other two residing at the (now demolished) Regent Theatre nearby and the State Theatre in Melbourne, and a Koh-i-Noor cut crystal chandelier which is the second largest on earth, weighing over four tonnes. The interior also included paintings by William Dobell and Julian Ashton. The 11 storeys above the theatre were constructed as the State Shopping Block, a vertical shopping arcade, 150 shops served by 8 lifts, all in the Gothic style of the street lobby. These floors were later converted to offices.

=== Condition ===
As at 1 June 2006, the physical condition is excellent.

== Heritage listing ==
As at 30 May 2006, the State Theatre, Sydney is of national heritage significance at an exceptional level, as a major milestone in the development of the cinema building in Australia, being a departure from the then-popular "atmospheric cinemas" and one of the last of the great flamboyant cinemas erected in the late 1920s, just prior to the Great Depression. It achieved a spatial enclosure of extraordinary fantasy, brilliantly capturing the cinema-going spirit of the times. In the State Theatre nothing was real, everything was fantasy, there to stimulate the imagination of the visitor and movie patron.

Its architectural composition is unique in Australia. The architectural and spatial progression from the introductory gothic imagery on the street frontage, through the 14th century Gothic Hall and Robert Adam inspired Empire Room to the Baroque drama of the Rotunda and French Empire decorated foyers into the splendour of the main auditorium is an experience unparalleled in any 19th or 20th century building in New South Wales. The interiors that make up this composition are of the highest of quality design in terms of theatricality and execution, they remain almost completely intact and in excellent condition.

The surviving sections of the gothic detailing are unique, of the highest quality craftsmanship and of exceptional significance. The State Theatre achieved a consistency of execution by the use of the gothic motif not only in the main street level foyers, as the spatial introduction to the Theatre and shopping areas, but across the whole street frontage, over the full extent of the multi-storey Market and George Streets facades and throughout the upper interior levels of the Shopping Block. The original gothic imagery of the street level facade and on the soffit of the awning, reflected and set the scene for the lavish interiors. The detailing remains almost intact and in good condition, except where Art Deco decoration was substituted in 1937.

The 1937 Market Street shopfront alterations have a high level of cultural significance as a fine and now rare example of Art Deco style of shopfront design, executed at a time when the Shopping Block needed a radical new image to counter flagging consumer support. Unfortunately, the alterations of latter decades have adversely impacted on the quality and integrity of this Art Deco decoration. The ultimate failure of the Shopping Block as a retail venue further reduces the significance of the Art Deco decoration.

The Theatre was the premier venue of the former Union Theatre company's Sydney chain, part of the organisation's ambitious national expansion programme in the 1920s, called the "Million Dollar Theatres" plan. It remains as the flagship of the Greater Union organisation and is associated with the many people who have worked in the organisation and the Theatre over much of the 20th century, but most notably its founder Stuart Doyle.

When erected in 1929 the flamboyantly decorated State Theatre was the ultimate public entertainment venue in New South Wales at a time when movie-going audiences were being thrilled by the increasing exuberance of each new cinema. It remained a popular movie venue for tens of thousands of people over many decades and was the scene of many movie premieres being celebrated with major public events. A high level of public interest is sustained by such events as the annual Sydney Film Festival and other special screenings.

Other aspects of the complex are significant for their original functions including a multi-storey retail arcade, ballroom and theatrette, although none of these activities survived into the late 20th century. The State Theatrette was a popular place for the public screening of newsreels and special movie presentations, while the State Ballroom remained a popular entertainment venue for many decades. The majority of the original interior decoration of these spaces has long since been removed.

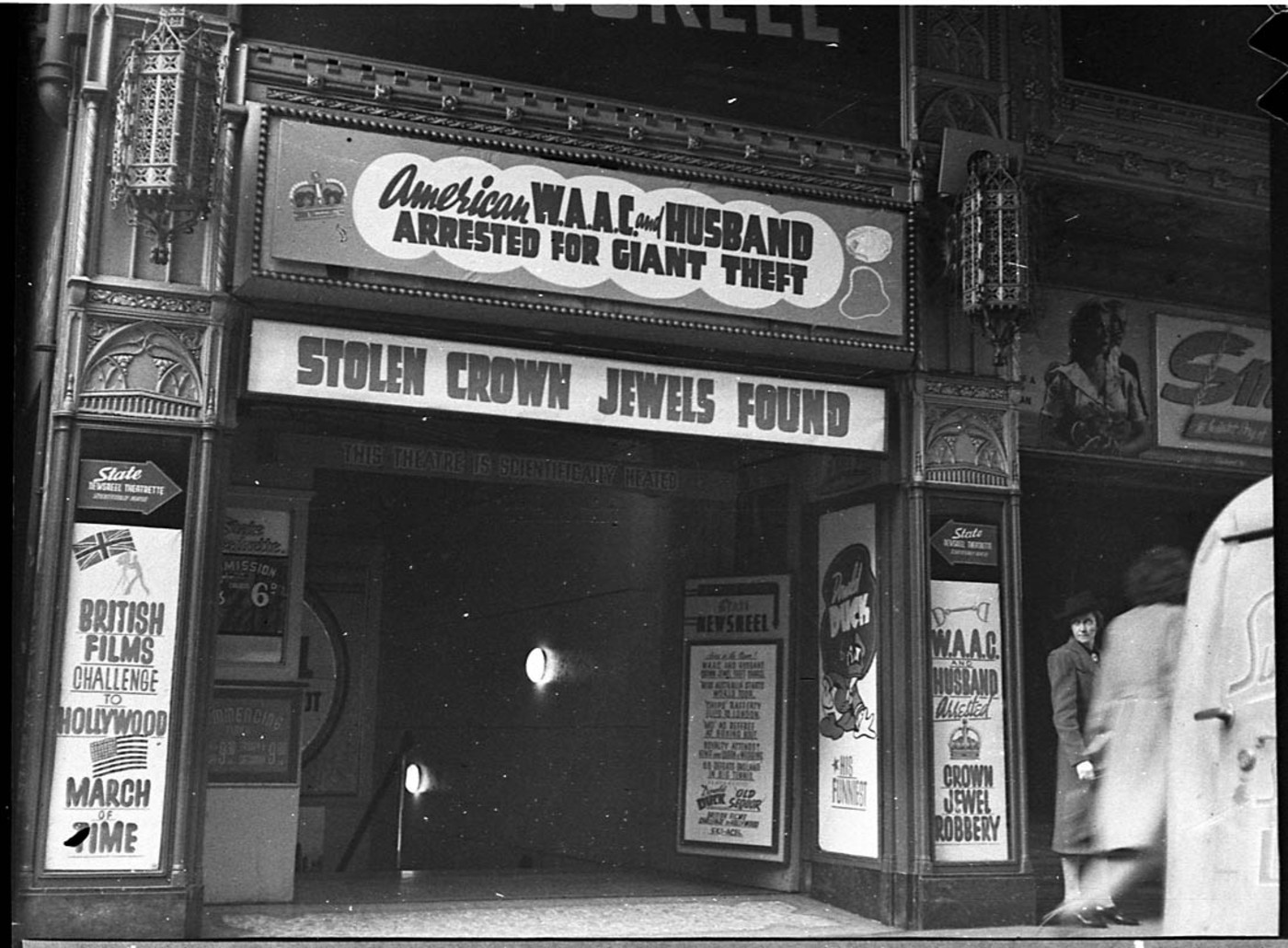
Newsreel Theatrette entrance on Market Street, July 1946

The State Theatre Building is significant as one of only two surviving theatre buildings in Sydney to have been designed by the well known theatre architect Henry E. White. The other is the Capital Theatre.

The interiors of the main public areas contain one of the largest applications of scagliola or reproduction of marble finishes in Australia. The quality of the plaster work, particularly in the Auditorium and Proscenium Arch and of other decorative items such as light fittings, is of the highest standard of 1920s design and craftsmanship. The Chandelier in the main Auditorium is one of the largest in the nation. There is a large collection of original paintings and statuary in the public foyers which arc of considerable artistic quality. The Wurlitzer Organ — a rare example of what used to be a major aspect of the movie-going experience — underwent a ten year restoration which was completed in 2019.

State Theatre was listed on the New South Wales State Heritage Register on 2 April 1999 having satisfied the following criteria. The building was listed on the (now defunct) Register of the National Estate.

The place is important in demonstrating the course, or pattern, of cultural or natural history in New South Wales.

The State Theatre, as the premier venue of the former Union Theatre company's Sydney chain, was part of the organisation's ambitious national expansion programme in the 1920s called the "Million Dollar Theatres" plan. It was a major milestone in the development of the cinema building in Australia, being a departure from the then-popular "atmospheric cinemas" and one of the last of the great flamboyant cinemas erected prior to the Depression. The subsequent use and development of the building have mirrored the development of the cinema and theatre as a popular entertainment medium throughout the later decades of the 20th century. It remains as the flagship of the Greater Union organisation and is associated with the many people who have worked in the organisation and the Theatre over much of the 20th century, but most notably its founder Stuart Doyle. The original multi-storey shopping arcade configuration reflected contemporary retail planning for the city, as an eventually unsuccessful variation to the multi-storey department store configuration. The basement areas of the building, when used as the State Ballroom and State Theatrette, were the venue for particular styles of public entertainment that flourished in the mid 20th century.

The place is important in demonstrating aesthetic characteristics and/or a high degree of creative or technical achievement in New South Wales.

It is an architectural composition that was unique in the late 1920s, of the highest quality of design and execution, and of national if not international importance for its creation of a spatial enclosure of extraordinary fantasy, brilliantly capturing the cinema-going spirit of the times. The architectural interiors that made up this composition remain almost completely intact and in excellent condition. The Theatre achieved a consistency of execution by the use of the gothic motif not only in the main foyers, as the spatial introduction to the auditorium and shopping areas, but across the street frontage, the full extent of the multi-storey Market and George Streets facades and the upper interior levels of the Shopping Block. The gothic detailing on the street frontage remains almost intact and in good condition, except for about one-third of the frontage, where Art Deco decoration was substituted in 1937. The success of the architectural and spatial composition was ensured by the unique combination of primarily Gothic and French Empire historical styles, rich interior detailing and the evocation of a rich palette of materials achieved largely by imitation.

The place has a strong or special association with a particular community or cultural group in New South Wales for social, cultural or spiritual reasons.

When erected in 1929 the flamboyantly decorated State Theatre was the ultimate public entertainment venue in New South Wales at a time when movie-going audiences were being thrilled with the increasing exuberance of each new cinema. It remained a popular movie venue for thousands of members of the public over many decades and was the place where many movie premieres were celebrated with major public events. This level of public interest is sustained by such events as the annual Sydney Film Festival and other special screenings.

The place has potential to yield information that will contribute to an understanding of the cultural or natural history of New South Wales.

The interiors of the main public areas contain one of the largest applications of scagliola or reproduction of marble finishes in Australia. The quality of the plaster who particularly in the Auditorium and Proscenium Arch and of other items such as light fittings, is of the highest standard of 1920s design and craftsmanship. The Chandelier in the main Auditorium is one of the largest in the nation. There is a large collection of original paintings and statuary in the public foyers which axe of considerable artistic quality. The Wurlitzer Organ, while no longer functional, is a rare example of what used to be a major part of the cinema and theatre going entertainment experience. There is a large collection of photographs of the State Theatre and Shopping Block taken soon after the building was finished. These remain as a unique collection of historical documents of the extraordinary original interiors, including the furniture and decoration. Subsequent photographs and other movie memorabilia, held by Greater Union, are a fine record of popular entertainment throughout the 20th century. The emergency diesel generator in the depths of the building is said to have been salvaged from a German submarine.

The place possesses uncommon, rare or endangered aspects of the cultural or natural history of New South Wales.

The cultural significance of the State Theatre is enhanced by a number of unique or rare characteristics. The entire State Theatre complex is unique in Australia, as a major early 20th-century entertainment venue with Gothic and French Empire inspired interiors of the highest quality design and craftsmanship. The gothic detailing on the Market Street shop frontage is unique in Australia as an example of early 20th-century decoration which functioned as an introduction to the dramatic theatrical imagery of the cinema within. The gothic decoration of the ground floor lift foyer to the former Shopping Block is unique for such as space in New South Wales and possibly Australia. The 1920s gothic detailing and composition of the main building facades to Market and George Streets is rare in Sydney for a commercial or public building. Only Scots Church and the former Grace Building can match it for such detailing and overall architectural composition. This language is also comparatively rare on the national and international scene. The Art Deco panelling on Market Street is rare as a shopfront in Sydney, there being only the Zink and Sons shopfront in Oxford Street and the former Sydney Electricity shopfronts from the Queen Victoria Building (now in the Powerhouse Museum) for comparison.

The place is important in demonstrating the principal characteristics of a class of cultural or natural places/environments in New South Wales.

The State Theatre site has a long history of development related to activities representative of the central business district of Sydney, including several buildings occupied by the Evening News. The building is representative of the adoption of contemporary cinema designs from the United States in the 1920s to capture a local audience for the emerging international popularity of the movies. The building is now both rare and representative of the great movie houses built in the major cities around Australia during the years before the Great Depression. The vertical Shopping Block was representative of that particular style of inner-city retailing, introduced in the 1920s but not successful in the face of competition from the large department stores.

== Gallery ==
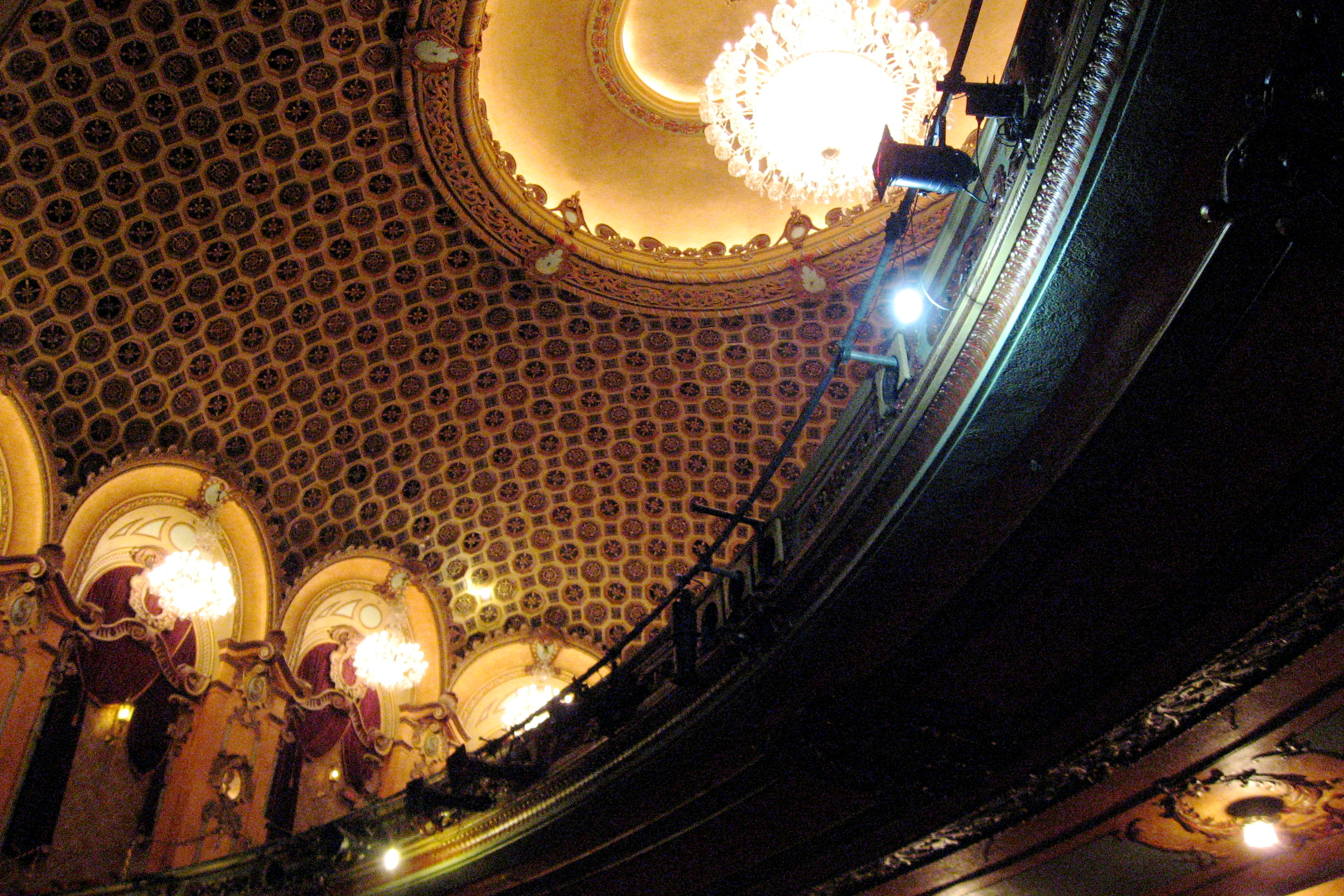
The State Theatre ceiling showcasing the Koh-i-Noor cut crystal chandelier

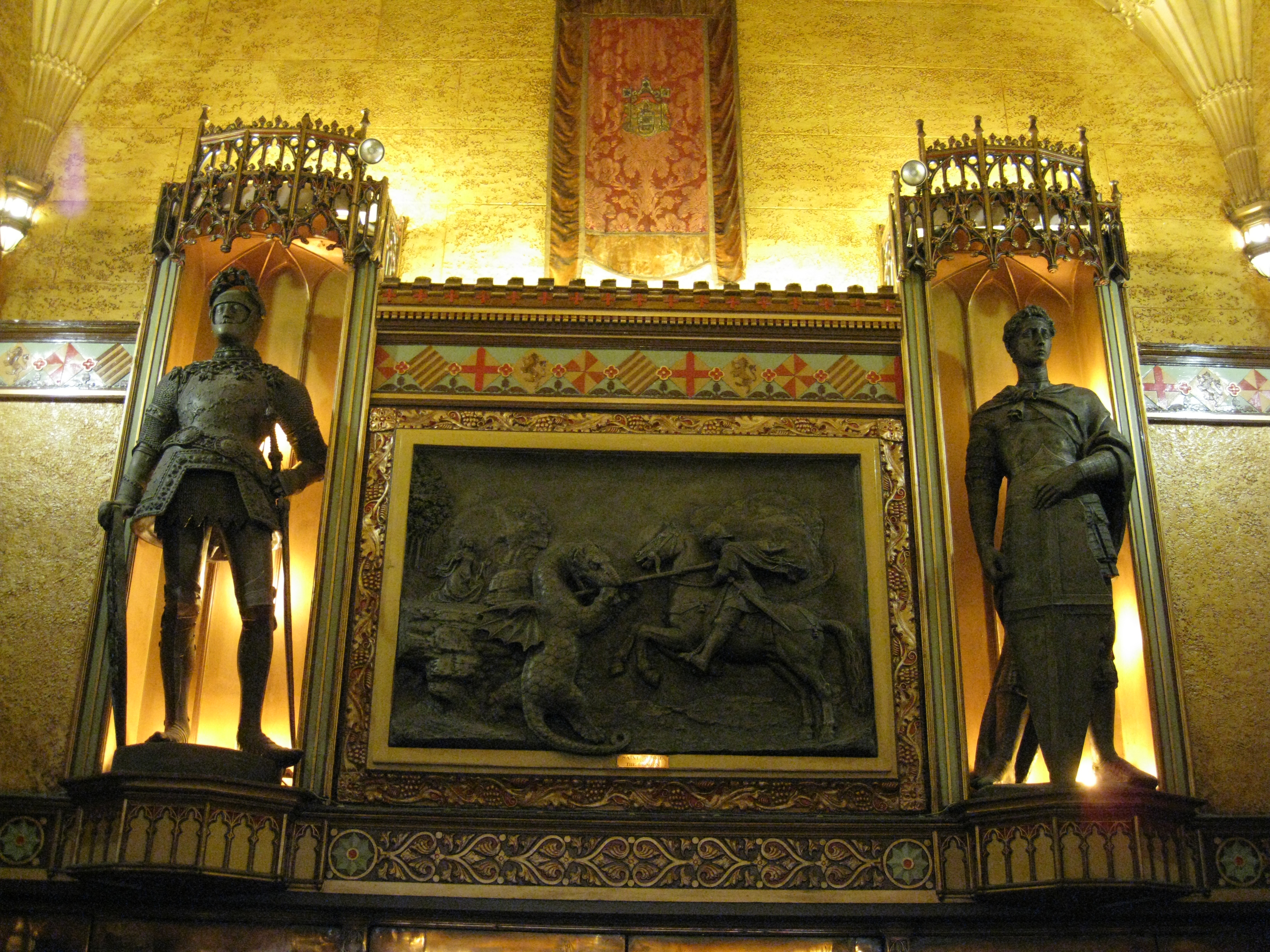
Statues in the foyer

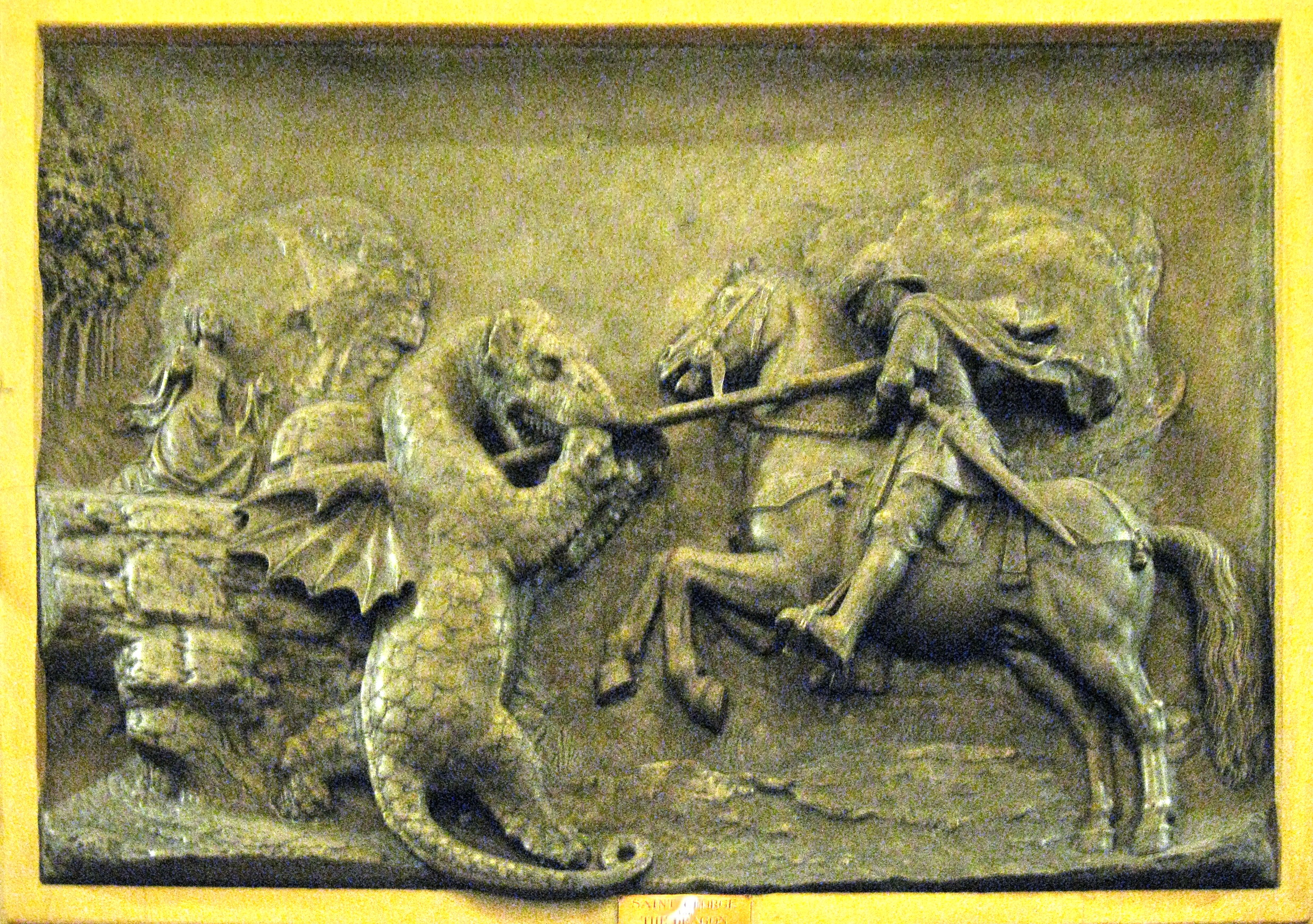
Close-up of the bronze relief featuring St. George and the dragon.

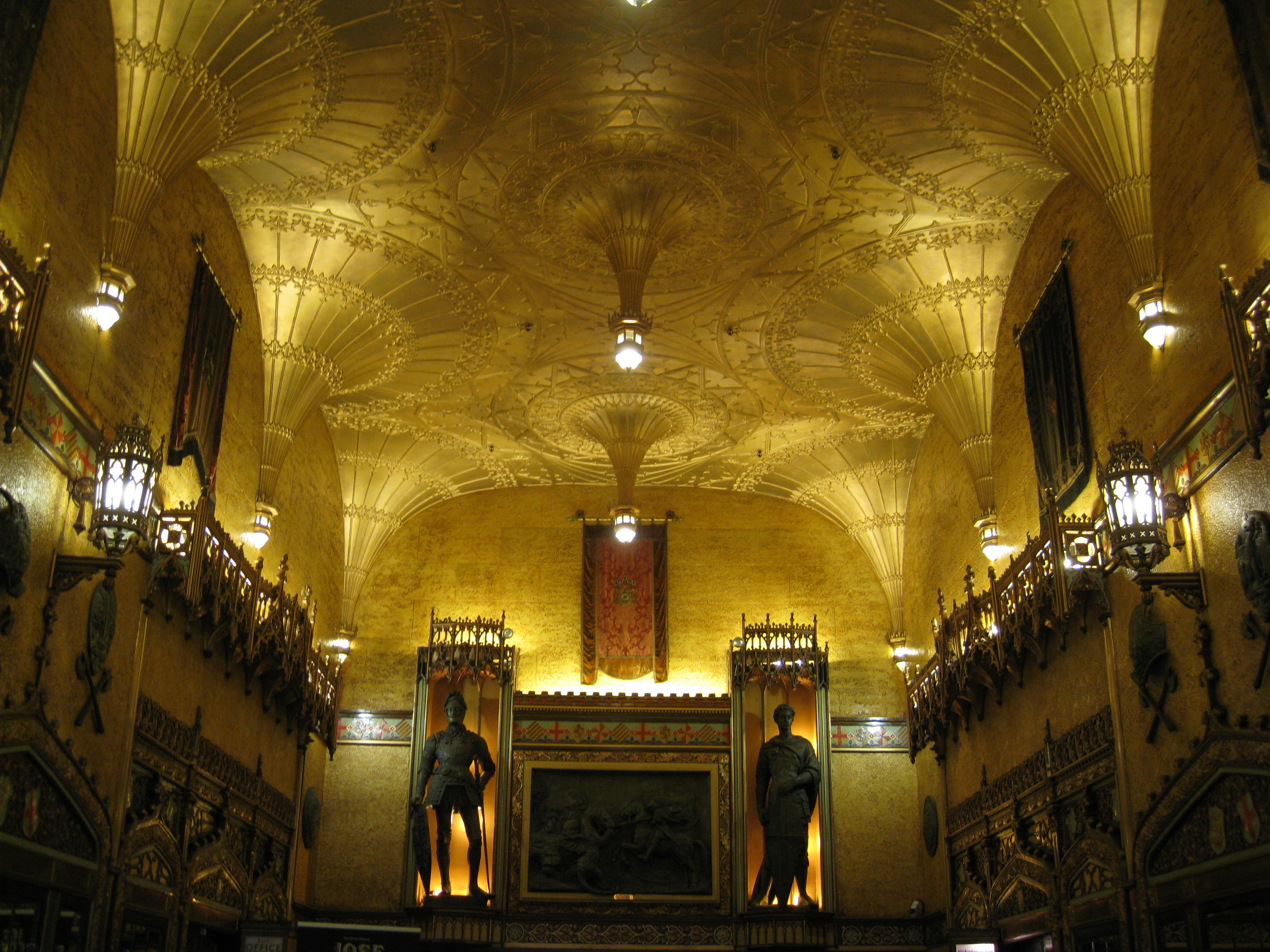
The State Theatre foyer

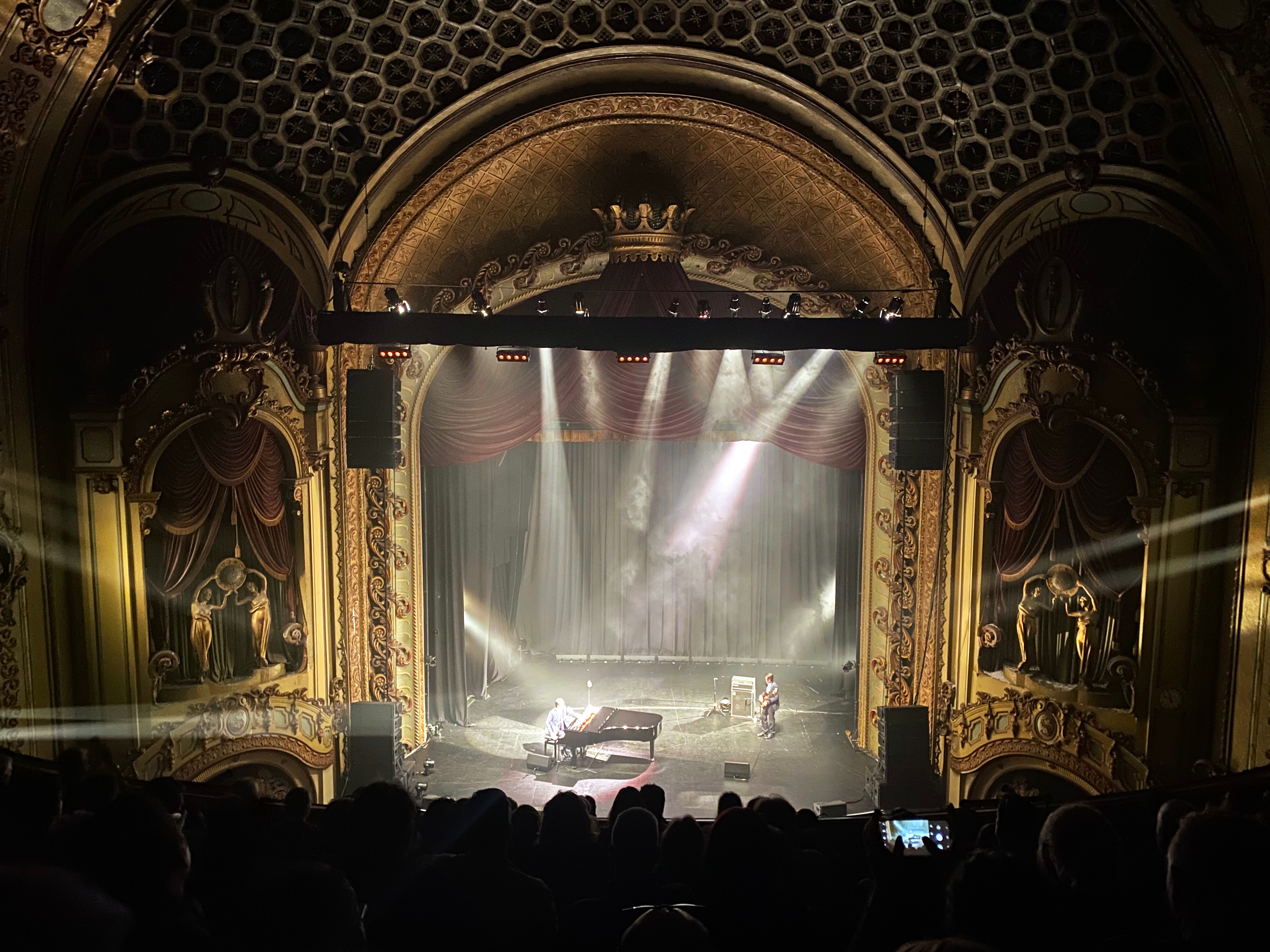
Musical performance mode, Nick Cave and Colin Greenwood, 30 April 2024

== See also ==
- Regent Theatre (Sydney)
