= Gerald Grove =

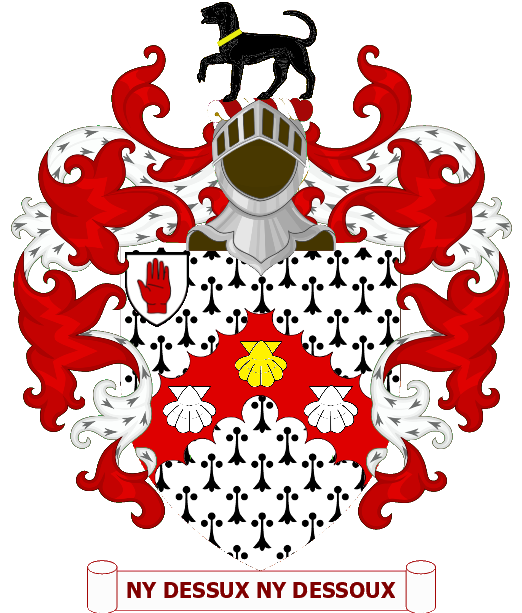
- Crest: A talbot passant Sable collared Or.
- Shield: Ermine on a chevron engrailed Gules three scallops the centre one Or between two others Argent.
- Motto: Ny Dessux Ny Dessoux (Neither Above Nor Below)

Sir Gerald Grove, 3rd Baronet (18 December 1886 – 3 March 1962) was an army officer and filmmaker. He was one of the Grove Baronets.

== Life and career ==
His father was Sir Walter Grove and his mother was the essayist Geraldine, Lady Grove.

He was educated at Sherborne School in Sherborne, Dorset. Grove joined the British South Africa Police in Rhodesia in 1911 and served during World War I in the South-West Africa Campaign and East African Campaign and with the King's African Rifles, rising to rank of lieutenant.

He was co-director of the 1929 film A Dangerous Woman and served in technical advisory roles in Tower of London, Christopher Strong, and the 1930 version of Raffles.

After holding several government positions, he succeeded to his title on 9 February 1932 and died unmarried 30 years later. He had inherited the manor of Sedgehill, Wiltshire, which was sold after his death.

Baronetage of the United Kingdom
Preceded by Walter Grove	Baronet (of Ferne House); 1932–1962	Succeeded by Walter Grove
