= River Sem =

River in Wiltshire, England

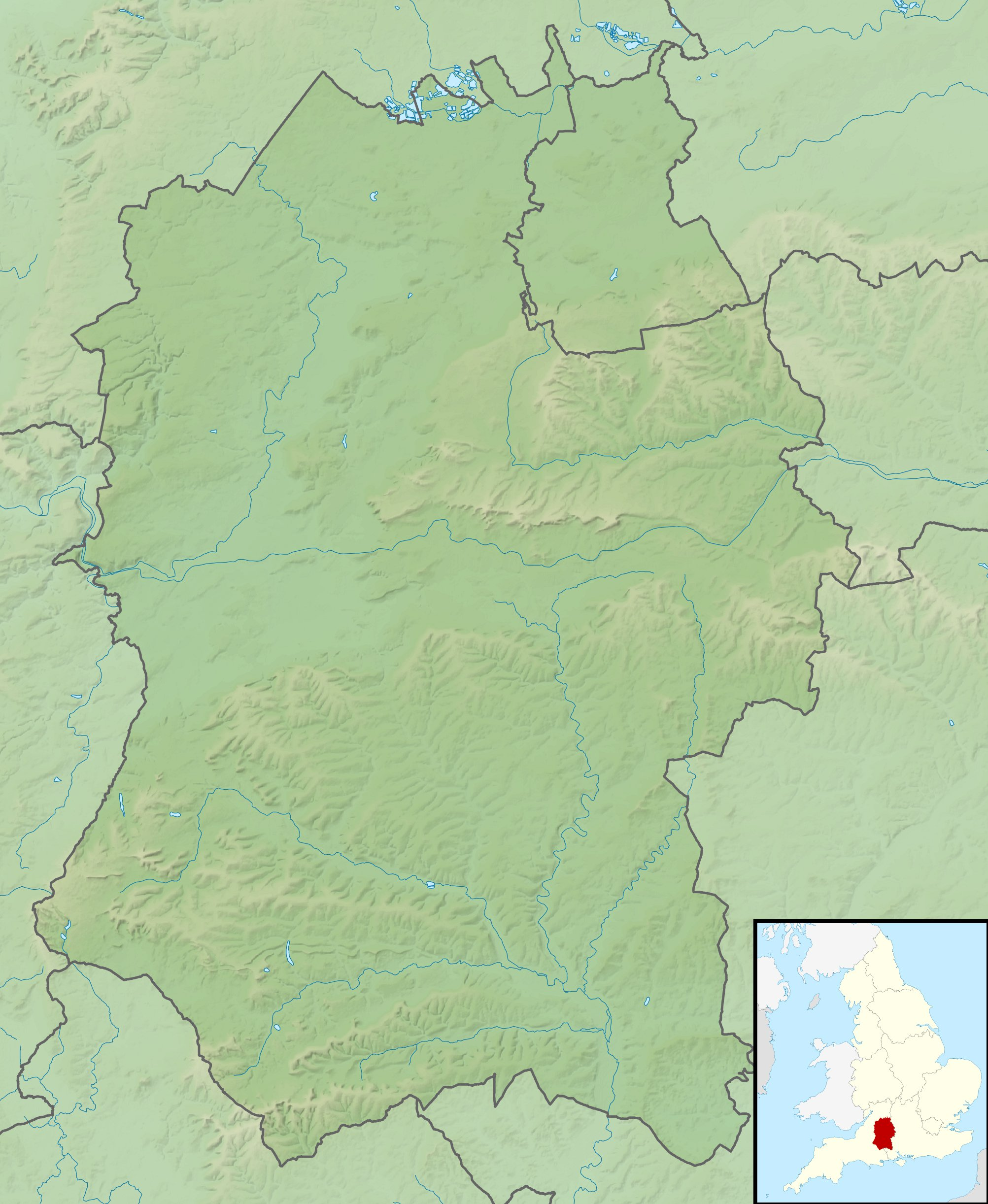
- Location of the mouth within Wiltshire

Location
- Country: United Kingdom
- Region: Wiltshire

Physical characteristics
- Source
  - location: East Knoyle, Wiltshire, England
  - coordinates: 51.0737°N 2.1678°W
- Mouth
  - location: Wardour, Wiltshire, England
  - coordinates: 51.045790°N 2.110142°W
  - elevation: 98 m (322 ft)
- Length: 7.03 km (4.37 mi)
- Basin size: 25.6 km^{2} (9.9 sq mi)

The River Sem is a natural waterway that flows through the ceremonial county of Wiltshire in England. It flows approximately 4 1/4 miles (7 km) from its source near East Knoyle to join the River Nadder near Wardour.

== Course ==
The source is Summerleaze Pond near East Knoyle, just east of the A350. The river flows southeast to Pondhead Copse, below which it flows through two large ponds: Brach Pond and Eeelstage Pond. It then turns east and flows under Savage Bridge and Share Lane before reaching the Nadder, northwest of Wardour.

=== Tributaries ===
The river is fed by several small waterways. On its south bank, a stream with a source near Whitebridge Farm southeast of Sedgehill, again close to the A350, flows east to join the Sem near Billhay Farm, above Pondhead Copse.

Also on the south bank, it is fed by a stream that has its source in Bennet's Copse near Hart Hill Stud Farm; this stream flows northeast through Sem Hill and Billhay Pond before joining the Sem at Pondhead Copse.

== Geology ==
The underlying geology is that of Kimmeridge Clay overlaying Limestone. Faults between the two layers give rise to the springs that provide the source of the water for the river catchment.

== Water quality ==
The Environment Agency measures the water quality of the river systems in England. Each is given an overall ecological status, which may be one of five levels: high, good, moderate, poor and bad. There are several components that are used to determine this, including biological status, which looks at the quantity and varieties of invertebrates, angiosperms and fish. Chemical status, which compares the concentrations of various chemicals against known safe concentrations, is rated good or fail.

Water quality of the River Sem in 2019:

Section	Ecological Status	Chemical Status	Overall Status	Length	Catchment	Channel
Sem	Moderate	Fail	Moderate	7.027 km (4.366 mi)	25.628 km^{2} (9.895 sq mi)	
