= Sedgehill =

Village in Wiltshire, England

Coordinates: 51.053°N 2.192°W

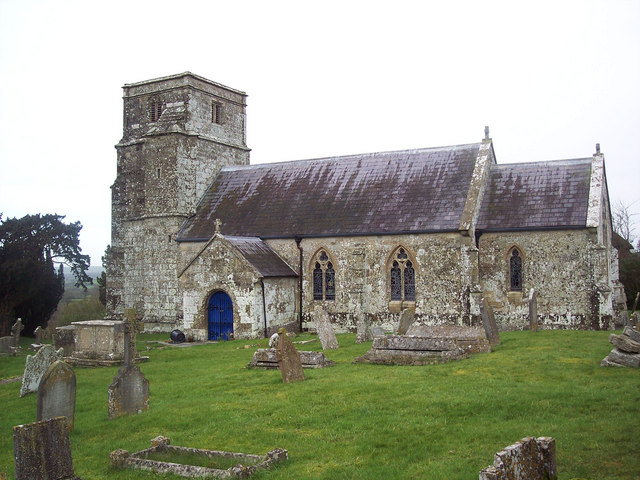
- St Catherine's Church in 2007

- Location within Wiltshire
- OS grid reference: ST866281
- Civil parish: Sedgehill and Semley
- Unitary authority: Wiltshire
- Ceremonial county: Wiltshire
- Region: South West
- Country: England
- Sovereign state: United Kingdom
- Post town: Shaftesbury
- Postcode district: SP7
- Dialling code: 01747
- Police: Wiltshire
- Fire: Dorset and Wiltshire
- Ambulance: South Western
- UK Parliament: Salisbury

Sedgehill is a small village and former civil parish, now in the parish of Sedgehill and Semley, in the southwest of the county of Wiltshire, England. It lies to the west of the A350 primary route, about 3 1/4 miles (5 km) north of Shaftesbury, Dorset.

== History ==
In the 12th century, and possibly the 11th, the lands which became Sedgehill parish were part of the estates of Shaftesbury Abbey. After the Dissolution, Sedgehill manor was bought by Thomas Arundell of Wardour Castle (c. 1502 – 1552) and then in 1573 by William Grove (died 1582) who was briefly MP for Shaftesbury. The estate remained in the Grove family (from 1874 the Grove baronets), although reduced in size as farms were sold, until the death of Gerald Grove in 1962.

The population of the parish rose to 216 at the 1871 census, and by 1961 had declined to 130.

On 1 April 1986, on recommendation of Salisbury District Council, the parish was amalgamated with Semley to form "Sedgehill and Semley" civil parish.

== Parish church ==
The Church of England parish church of St Catherine has origins in the 14th century. In 1395 it became a chapelry of the church at Berwick St Leonard, which was connected with Shaftesbury Abbey. This pertained until 1914, when Sedgehill was made a parish and supplemented with 318 acres transferred from East Knoyle. Today the parish is part of the Benefice of St Bartholomew, which covers six churches including St Leonard's at Semley.

The church is in limestone with slate roofs. The west tower was built in the 15th century; work in the 17th included rebuilding of the tower's upper stage, and the porch was rebuilt in 1765. In 1845 the chancel and nave were rebuilt, and the vestry added. The tower has five bells, including two from the 17th century, but they are said to be unringable. The church was recorded as Grade II* listed in 1966.
