= A Dangerous Woman (1929 film) =

1929 film

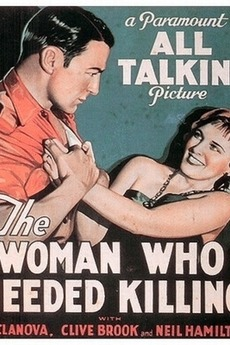
- Directed by: Gerald Grove; Rowland V. Lee
- Screenplay by: John Farrow; Edward E. Paramore Jr.
- Based on: "A Woman Who Needed Killing" by Margery Lawrence
- Starring: Baclanova; Clive Brook
- Distributed by: Paramount Pictures
- Release date: May 16, 1929
- Running time: 80 min
- Country: United States
- Language: English

Full film

A Dangerous Woman is a 1929 American Pre-Code drama film released by Paramount, based on the Margery Lawrence story, A Woman Who Needed Killing, which also is an alternate title of the film. It was directed by Gerald Grove and Rowland V. Lee from a script by John Farrow and Edward E. Paramore Jr. The film stars Olga Baclanova (billed as Baclanova) as Tania Gregory and Clive Brook as her husband, Frank Gregory, and is set in British East Africa.

== Plot ==
As described in a magazine review, Tania Gregory is the Russian-born wife of Commissioner Frank Gregory at an outpost in British East Africa. As the dangerous woman, she needs attention and goes out and creates it when it is not forthcoming. The first to fall under the tropical spell of the blond Tania is Peter Allerton, outstanding English youth and the assistant of Frank. His finish is a self-administered gunshot wound though the head. Frank's younger brother Bobby takes his place, and it seems that the same ending for Bobby. However, Tania dies first, but not of natural causes. On learning of her designs on his brother, Frank slips a drug into her orange juice. However, Tubbs sees him, and sets a dead reptile next to the bed and in the morning screams that she is dead from a snake bite. This appears to be a ruse to cover the murder. Frank and his brother leave for England.

== Cast ==
- Olga Baclanova as Tania Gregory
- Clive Brook as Frank Gregory
- Neil Hamilton as Bobby Gregory
- Clyde Cook as Tubbs
- Leslie Fenton as Peter Allerton
- Snitz Edwards as Chief Macheria

== Reception ==
Producer Davis Lewis saw the preview. He wrote "At the first appearance of Baclanova, the audience started to scream with laughter. Playing an alluring Vampire, she was slightly on the aging side. And worse, she Wasa ham."

== See also ==
- List of early sound feature films (1926–1929)

== Notes ==
- Lewis, David (1993). Curtis, James (ed.). The Creative Producer. Metuchen: Scarecrow Press. ISBN 0-8108-2720-4.
