= Grove baronets =

Baronetcy in the Baronetage of the United Kingdom

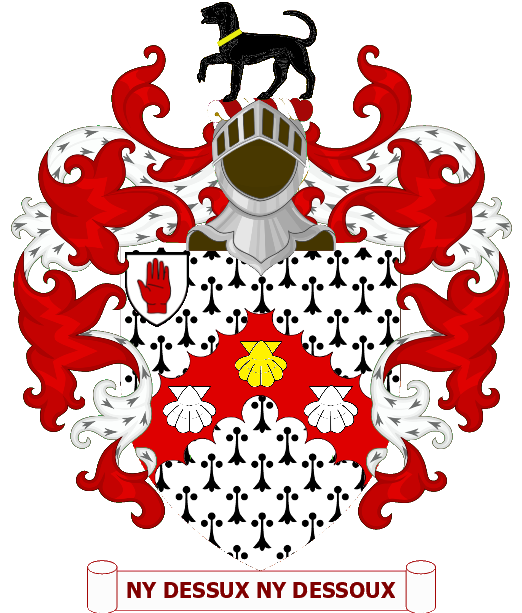
- Crest: A talbot passant Sable collared Or.
- Shield: Ermine on a chevron engrailed Gules three scallops the centre one Or between two others Argent.
- Motto: Ny Dessux Ny Dessoux (Neither Above Nor Below)

The Grove Baronetcy, of Ferne House, in the parish of Donhead St Andrew in the County of Wiltshire, is a title in the Baronetage of the United Kingdom. It was created on 18 March 1874 for Thomas Grove, Liberal Member of Parliament for Wiltshire South and Wilton.

The Grove family descends from John Grove, who settled in Wiltshire in the 15th century. A later member of the family, William Grove (d. 1582), briefly represented Shaftesbury in the House of Commons. He purchased the Ferne estate in 1563 and the manor of Sedgehill, Wiltshire, in 1573; the latter continued in the Grove family, albeit reduced in size, until shortly after the death of the third baronet in 1962.

The presumed fourth Baronet never successfully proved his succession and was never on the Official Roll of the Baronetage. As of 2007 the presumed fifth and present Baronet has also not successfully proven his succession and is therefore not on the Official Roll, with the baronetcy considered dormant since 1962.

== Grove baronets, of Ferne House (1874) ==
- Sir Thomas Fraser Grove, 1st Baronet (1823–1897)
- Sir Walter John Grove, 2nd Baronet (1852–1932)
- Sir Gerald Grove, 3rd Baronet (1886–1962)
- Walter Felipe Grove, 4th Baronet (1927–1974)
- Charles Gerald Grove, presumed 5th Baronet (born 1929). His name does not appear on the Official Roll as of 2026, which marks the baronetcy as dormant.

The heir presumptive is the present holder's brother Harold Thomas Grove (born 1930).
