= Semley =

Village in Wiltshire, England

Coordinates: 51.041°N 2.157°W

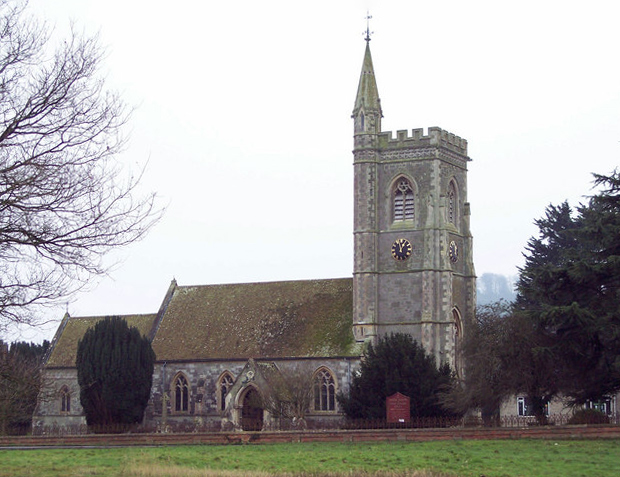
- Semley Church

- Location within Wiltshire
- OS grid reference: ST8926
- Civil parish: Sedgehill and Semley
- Unitary authority: Wiltshire
- Ceremonial county: Wiltshire
- Region: South West
- Country: England
- Sovereign state: United Kingdom
- Post town: Shaftesbury
- Postcode district: SP7
- Dialling code: 01747
- Police: Wiltshire
- Fire: Dorset and Wiltshire
- Ambulance: South Western
- UK Parliament: Salisbury

Semley is a village and former civil parish, now in the parish of Sedgehill and Semley, in Wiltshire, England, about 3 miles (4.8 km) north-east of Shaftesbury in neighbouring Dorset. The hamlet of Sem Hill lies about a quarter of a mile west of the village. In 1961 the parish had a population of 477.

The River Sem, from which the village takes its name, forms part of the northern boundary of the parish.

== History ==
In AD 955 King Eadwig granted land to Wilton Abbey, and Semley was probably part of that estate. In the 1530s. under Henry VIII's Dissolution of the Monasteries, the Abbey had to surrender its lands to the Crown, including the manor of Semley.

In 1541 Henry VIII granted Semley to Sir Edward Bayntun and his wife Lady Isabel as part of his policy of re-allocated monastic land to his nobles. In 1572 in Queen Elizabeth's reign, Bayntun's son Francis restored Semley to the Crown, and later that year Elizabeth I granted Semley to Matthew Arundell of Wardour Castle, who was knighted in 1574. In 1605 his son Thomas was created Baron Arundell of Wardour, and the Wardour estate has held land at Semley ever since.

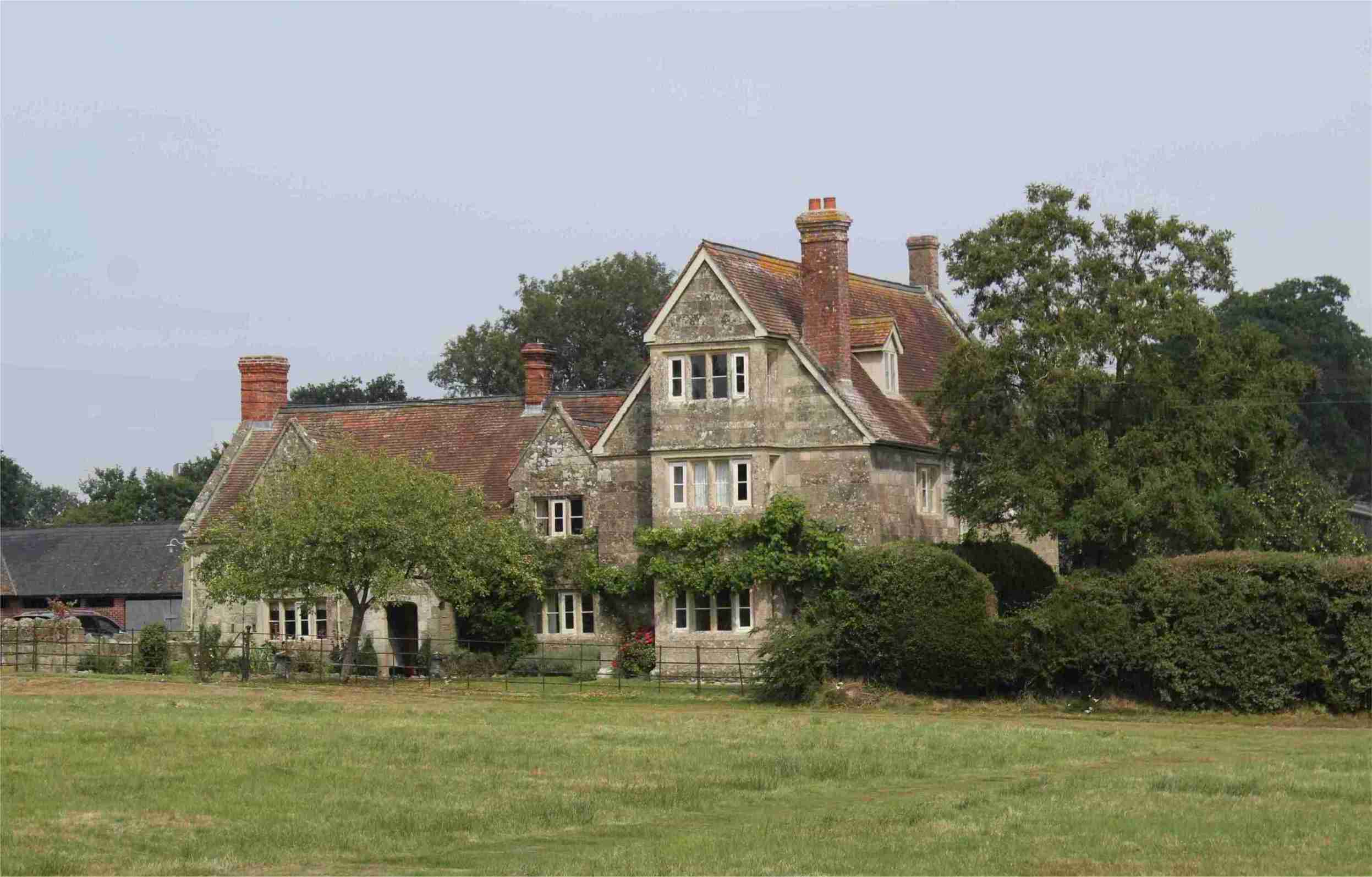
Church Farmhouse, Semley, in 2020

In the village north of the church, Church Farmhouse is a 16th-century building, extended in the 17th and 19th centuries.

Hook Manor, in the east of the parish near Wardour, is a Jacobean manor house built in 1637 by Thomas Arundell, in local stone quarried about 3.5 miles (5.6 km) away at Tisbury. Arundell gave the house in 1639 to Cecil Calvert, 2nd Baron Baltimore, proprietor of colonies in Maryland and Newfoundland. In 1935 the house was remodelled to designs by the architect T. Lawrence Dale, who reinstated the earlier hall and added a neighbouring room to enlarge it. Dale also removed the porch, and added a staircase and a service wing.

On 1 April 1986 the parish was abolished and merged with Sedgehill to form "Sedgehill and Semley".

=== Later landowners ===
Between 1806 and 1820 the 9th and 10th Barons Wardour sold 882 acres (357 ha) of Semley Manor to John Benett of the Pythouse (Pyt House) estate, northeast of Semley. By 1839 about 550 acres (220 ha) at Semley remained in the Arundell family.

By 1839 Benett's estate at Semley amounted to 1,064 acres (431 ha), but by 1847 about 350 acres (140 ha) of the land bought from the Arundells had been re-sold. The bulk of Benett's acquisitions at Semley remained with his heirs until his grandson Vere Fane Benett-Stanford died in 1894 and his widow married Charles Thomas-Stanford in 1897. The estate then passed to John Benett's great-grandson John Fane-Benett-Stanford, who died in 1947.

In 1847 Richard Grosvenor, 2nd Marquess of Westminster bought Westwood Farm from John Benett. He had already bought Bowmarsh Farm and Hart Hill Farm and this gave him a total of about 350 acres (140 ha) at Semley. This estate descended by the Marquess's daughter Octavia to her husband Sir Michael Shaw-Stewart, 7th Baronet. After the death of Sir Michael in 1903 and Lady Octavia in 1921, their son Walter Richard Shaw-Stewart held about 850 acres (340 ha) at Semley. He then sold off about 250 acres (100 ha) including Westwood Farm between 1924 and 1927.

== Parish church ==
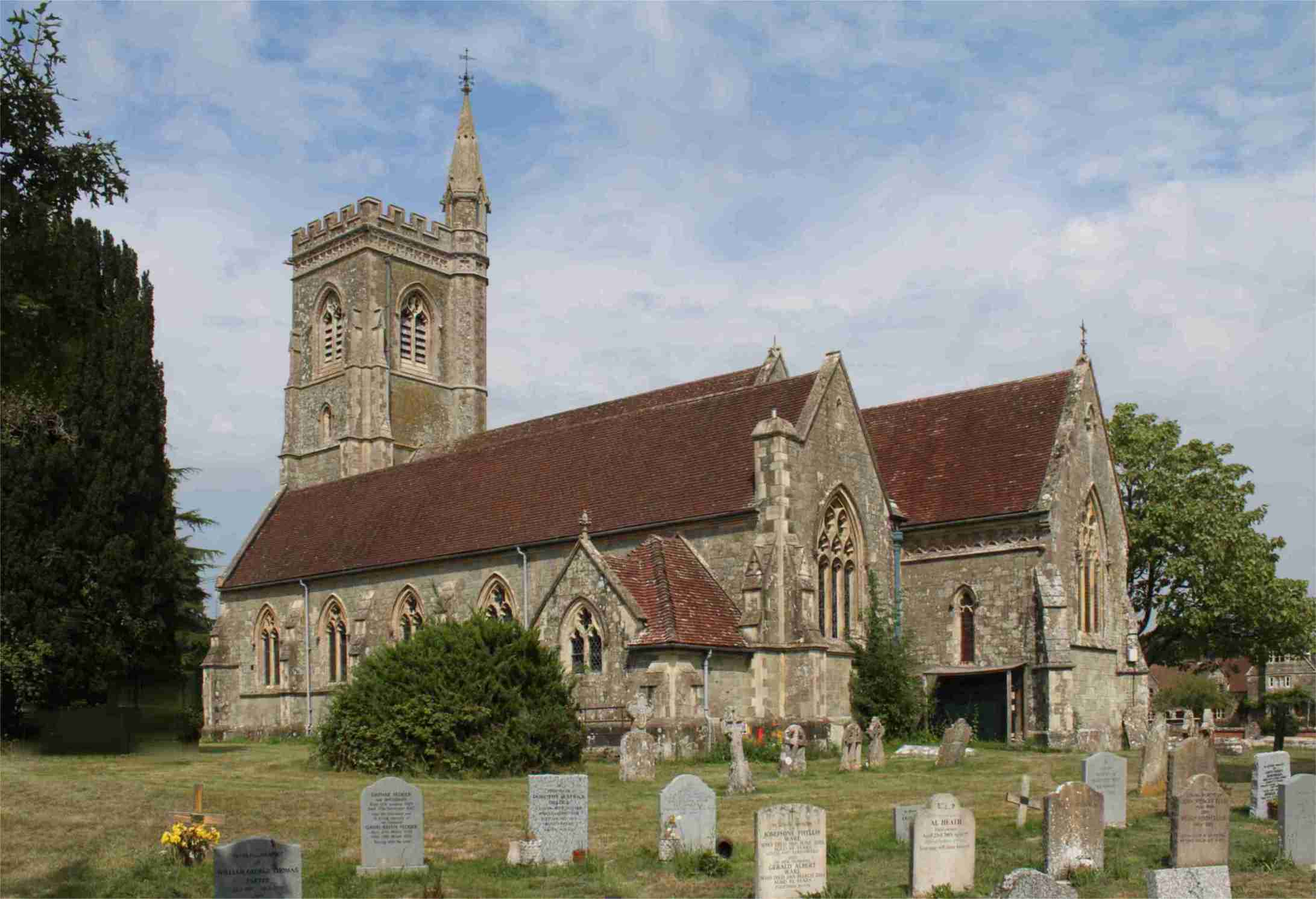
Semley church from the southeast

By 1191 Semley had a parish church and a Rector.

In the 19th century the Church of England parish church of Saint Leonard was rebuilt to designs by Thomas Wyatt: the rebuilding of the chancel was in 1866 and the remainder of the church was demolished and replaced in 1874–75. The new church is a Gothic Revival building in Perpendicular Gothic style with a tall west tower that has a spire on its stair-turret. The 12th-century font bowl was retained, and a late-13th century effigy of a priest was salvaged from the north porch of the medieval church and re-set in the new church.

In 1976 the Diocese of Salisbury united St. Leonard's benefice with Sedgehill, and in 1985 East Knoyle was added. The parishes of Charlton, Donhead St Andrew and Donhead St Mary have since been added to form the present Benefice of Saint Bartholomew.

In 1987 the church was recorded as Grade II listed, along with the dwarf brick walls and decorative cast-iron railings on two sides of the churchyard.

In 1553 St. Leonard's had a ring of four bells. One of these was cast by Robert Burford of London in about 1410 and remains in use at St. Leonard's today. In 1733 William Cockey of Bristol cast the treble bell. In 1878 Mears and Stainbank of the Whitechapel Bell Foundry cast the tenor bell to complete St. Leonards' present ring of six.

== Chapels ==
Semley and East Knoyle had a Baptist congregation by about 1820 and opened a Particular Baptist chapel at Semley in 1823. The chapel closed after 1985. It is built of stone and slate and was Grade II listed in 1987.

Semley had a Methodist congregation by 1810, which worshipped in members' homes until 1877 when a small, red-brick Wesleyan Methodist chapel opened at St. Bartholomew's Hill. It closed in 1964.

== Economic and social history ==
Semley's farmland has long been mostly pasture. Its small amount of arable land was partly enclosed by the 14th century and mostly enclosed by the 16th century. Semley's pasture was mostly common land in the Middle Ages but about 500 acres (200 ha) were enclosed between 1599 and 1769. Proposals to enclose the remaining 300 acres (120 ha) of Semley's common pasture were defeated in 1813 and 1836 and they remained in common in 1985.

A National School for the parish was built in 1841, next to the church; a teacher's house was built in 1866 and a second classroom, for infants, was added in 1882. It is now Semley Church of England Voluntary Aided Primary School.

In 1859 the Salisbury and Yeovil Railway was completed through the parish and opened Semley railway station close to the A350 about 1.25 miles (2.01 km) west of the village. Nearby sprang up a dairy organising milk collection from the local farms, and a pipeline carried milk on a gantry over the road and into tank wagons in a siding. British Railways closed the station in 1966 but the railway remains open as part of the West of England Main Line.

Semley's public house, the Benett Arms, has traded as such since at least 1867, and may be the same as the New Inn at Semley recorded in 1855 and 1865.

Much of Semley's pasture had long been devoted to dairy farming, and in about 1871 one Thomas Kirby started a business close to Semley station buying milk and sending it by rail to London. Kirby expanded his business with other depots in south Wiltshire and Dorset in the 1880s. By 1889 it was trading as Semley and Gillingham Dairies, and in 1890 it became Salisbury, Semley and Gillingham Dairies. United Dairies (Wholesale) Ltd. bought the business in 1920 and added a factory at Semley by 1924. In 1928 United Dairies added milk pasteurisation and storage facilities and a cheese-making facility. In 1944 the cheese room was converted to an egg store. In 1959 United Dairies merged with Cow & Gate to form Unigate. By 1985 Unigate had closed the Semley factory and it was being divided into smaller units for industrial use.

== Notable people ==
- Robert Morley (1908–1992), actor – born in Semley
- Yvonne Fletcher, WPC in the Metropolitan Police, murdered from inside the Libyan Embassy, London, 1984 – born in Semley
- Julian Bream, classical guitarist – lived in Semley from the 1960s until 2008.

== Sources ==
- Pevsner, Nikolaus; Cherry, Bridget (revision) (1975) [1963]. Wiltshire. The Buildings of England. Harmondsworth: Penguin Books. p. 466. ISBN 0 14 071026 4.
