= Hurn Court =

Listed building in Dorset, England

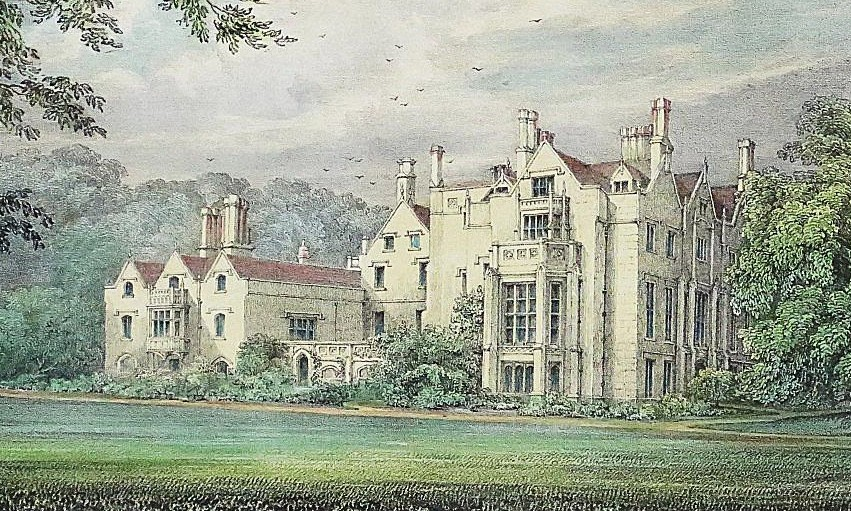
- Heron Court (now Hurn Court) painted c. 1828 by George Frederick Prosser (1805–1882)
- Interactive map of the Hurn Court area
- Former names: Heron Court

General information
- Architectural style: Georgian
- Location: Hurn, Dorset, England
- Coordinates: 50.762881°N 1.8291239°W
- Client: James Harris, 1st Earl of Malmesbury
- Owner: Private housing development

Listed Building – Grade II*
- Designated: 30 September 1964
- Reference no.: 1324679

Hurn Court in Hurn near Christchurch, Dorset, was the home of the Earls of Malmesbury between 1795 and 1951. It was sold on the death of the 5th Earl and opened as a boarding school for boys in 1952, before being developed for housing in the 1990s. It has been a Grade II* Listed building since 1964.

== Description and location ==
Hurn Court is a former stately home in the parish of Hurn, Dorset. It is situated 3 1/2 miles (5.6 km) north-west of Christchurch between the Rivers Stour and Moors.

=== Architecture ===
Hurn Court has been registered as a grade II* listed building since 30 September 1964. It is a three storey, brick-built residence, with rendered exterior and string courses, and is of various ages, with the earliest visible parts dating back to the late 16th century. The house is large and irregular, but the main block is E-shaped, the central portion and north front of which, forms part of the old Elizabethan grange. An 1806 plan depicts out-buildings to the east and west of the house. Some of these were cleared away in 1807, when the house was greatly extended by Garbet of Southampton. The works were completed in 1815. The house was altered again in 1840, when the third storey and another wing were added.

The roof is pitched and slated with a parapet, and contains a fourth, attic, floor with dormer windows. The other windows are casement with dripstone moulds and mullions. The outer wings of the E-shaped main block are coped and have finials. The main entrance has a two-storey porch with buttresses and a gable which incorporates a typanum and cartouche. The pillars of the main gate were originally topped with matching herons but these have since been replaced with urns.

Today, the 12-acre site has 35 private dwellings, eight in the main house, the others in external buildings such as coach house, stable block and cottages.

Other parts considered to be of architectural importance include, the stable blocks, listed on 22 May 1975, and ice house, and the walls around the courtyard and enclosed garden, listed on 12 February 1976. All were given grade II status.

Hurn Court and the 30-acre grounds was the inspiration for Rookington House and Park in Thomas Hardy’s 1876 story, The Hand of Ethelberta.

== History ==
The site was once occupied by a mediaeval grange belonging to Christchurch Priory, where the Moors River was widened to accommodate a stock pond, and was part of the manor of Hurn until 1575 when it was acquired by Robert Odber under a ninety-nine-year lease from Sir Edward Seymour, 1st Baronet. In 1652, it passed to Parkinson Odber who died in 1661 and left it to Edward Hooper. In May 1700, he passed it to his son, also called Edward, on his son's marriage to Dorothy Ashley. The couple had a son whom they named after his father and grandfather. This Edward eventually inherited the house, the lease having been purchased in the July following his father's wedding. The last Edward Hooper died unmarried and childless in 1795. He left Heron Court and the manor of Hurn, bought in 1754 by his father, to his cousin, James Harris, 1st Earl of Malmesbury.

=== Smuggling ===
The third Edward Hooper was a commissioner of customs and at that time, Heron Court bordered a large heath that stretched as far as Poole in the east and down to the English Channel. The area was a popular haunt of smugglers. One evening in 1780, Hooper was entertaining Lord Shaftesbury, the Chairman of the Customs and Excise. When they sat down to dine, Hooper positioned himself with his back to the window. A while later, they were disturbed by the sound of horses and wagons, moving quickly outside. Shaftesbury leapt up to look but Hooper remained seated and continued with his meal. Shortly after, some dragoons called and Hooper was able to truthfully say that he had not seen a thing.

The First Earl of Malmesbury would later remark, "All classes contributed to its support, the farmers lent their teams and labourers, and the gentry openly connived at the practise and dealt with the smugglers".

=== The Earls of Malmesbury ===
The first earl had the house altered substantially, both internally and externally with the addition of a southern wing and staircase leading down into the grounds. He did not, however, spend a great deal of time at his newly acquired property, until after his retirement. Caroline of Brunswick stayed at Hurn Court whilst Malmesbury was attempting to facilitate her engagement to the Prince of Wales.

The second earl resided almost exclusively at Hurn Court where he revelled in hunting the local fauna; much of which he had stuffed and displayed at the house. He had the house extended considerably with another wing and a third storey, and added a drawing room in memory of his wife who had died in an accident. In 1820, he renamed the house, Heron Court.

About 1824, the earl imported a dog from New Foundland, which, as a strong swimmer, made an excellent gun dog. He was the first person in the UK to acquire and breed such a dog, which he renamed, Labrador.

In 1841, the house passed to the third earl of Malmesbury. When the railway first came to Christchurch in 1862, the route chosen for it cut through several miles of the Malmesbury estate. As a condition, the earl demanded that two stations be provided: one at Hurn, for him and his family, and a second at Avon Lodge, for his staff. The line closed in 1935 and the track was removed but both stations still exist: Hurn as a hotel and Avon Lodge as a private residence.

The third earl died childless in May 1889, leaving his title, estate and Heron Court to his nephew, Edward Harris.

At the beginning of the first world war, refugees from Belgium began arriving in England, around 20 were sheltered at Heron Court, with a further 20 staying elsewhere in the village. The house, at that time, was occupied by 5th Earl of Malmesbury and his wife, Dorothy Gough-Calthorpe, daughter of Augustus Gough-Calthorpe, 6th Baron Calthorpe. In 1935, the house reverted back to its original name of Hurn Court. Lady Malmesbury was the president of the Hampshire branch of the Red Cross and during World War II, part of the building was used as its headquarters.

Hurn Court remained the seat of the Earls of Malmesbury until the death of the fifth earl in 1950. The contents were auctioned in October that year, and the house and grounds were sold in 1951. It reopened as a boys' school in 1952.

=== Hurn Court School ===
The house was purchased in 1951 for £6,000 by the headmaster to be, Mr Tyler. Very little was done to the building, either externally or internally, except for changes of furniture, and was opened as a boarding school for boys with an interest in farming, in May 1952. The curriculum was a mixture of academic and practical subjects with an increased focus on physical education. Subjects such as mathematics, English and science were included but Latin and Greek were dropped in favour of, among other subjects; agricultural science, technical drawing and welding.By the 1980's the school was taking in sons of armed forces personnel and had its own Air training cops 2525 sqd and army and sea cadets

The school closed on 15 December 1989. The site was sold and developed for housing in the 1990s with the main building being converted into six apartments.
