= Compton Park House =

Manor house in Wiltshire, England

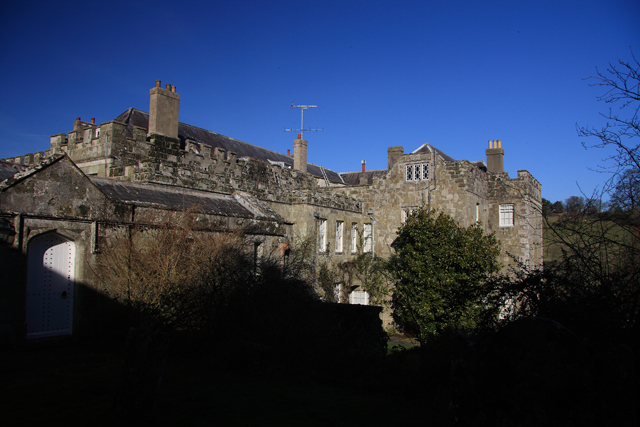

- Location within Wiltshire
- 51.0704°N 1.9597°W
- Location: Compton Chamberlayne, Wiltshire, England

Listed Building – Grade I
- Official name: Compton Park House
- Designated: 23 March 1960
- Reference no.: 1146151

Compton Park House (or Compton House) is a Grade I listed manor house in Compton Chamberlayne, Wiltshire, England, about 7 miles (11 km) east of Salisbury.

== History ==
Compton Park House was the seat of the Penruddocke (or Penruddock) family from the mid-16th century until 1930. Much of their initial influence was owed to their patrons, the Earls of Pembroke of nearby Wilton Abbey. They were a notable Royalist family, with Colonel John Penruddock, an owner of the house, being the namesake for the failed 1655 Penruddock uprising against Oliver Cromwell. For this he was tried and executed at Exeter on 16 May 1655. Several other members of the family were local Members of Parliament or High Sheriffs of Wiltshire.

== Architecture ==
The present house may occupy the site of a medieval manor house; Pevsner saw fragments of medieval work. It was refitted internally by Sir Edward Penruddocke in the late 17th century and rebuilt externally in 1780 by Charles Penruddocke. The drawing room from about 1700 has panelling and rich decoration in Grinling Gibbons style, with a plaster ceiling from the same period. In the dining room, part of the 1780 additions, is a plaster ceiling in Adam style.

The stable block dates from the late 18th century. The house has been a Grade I listed building since 1960.

== Compton Park ==
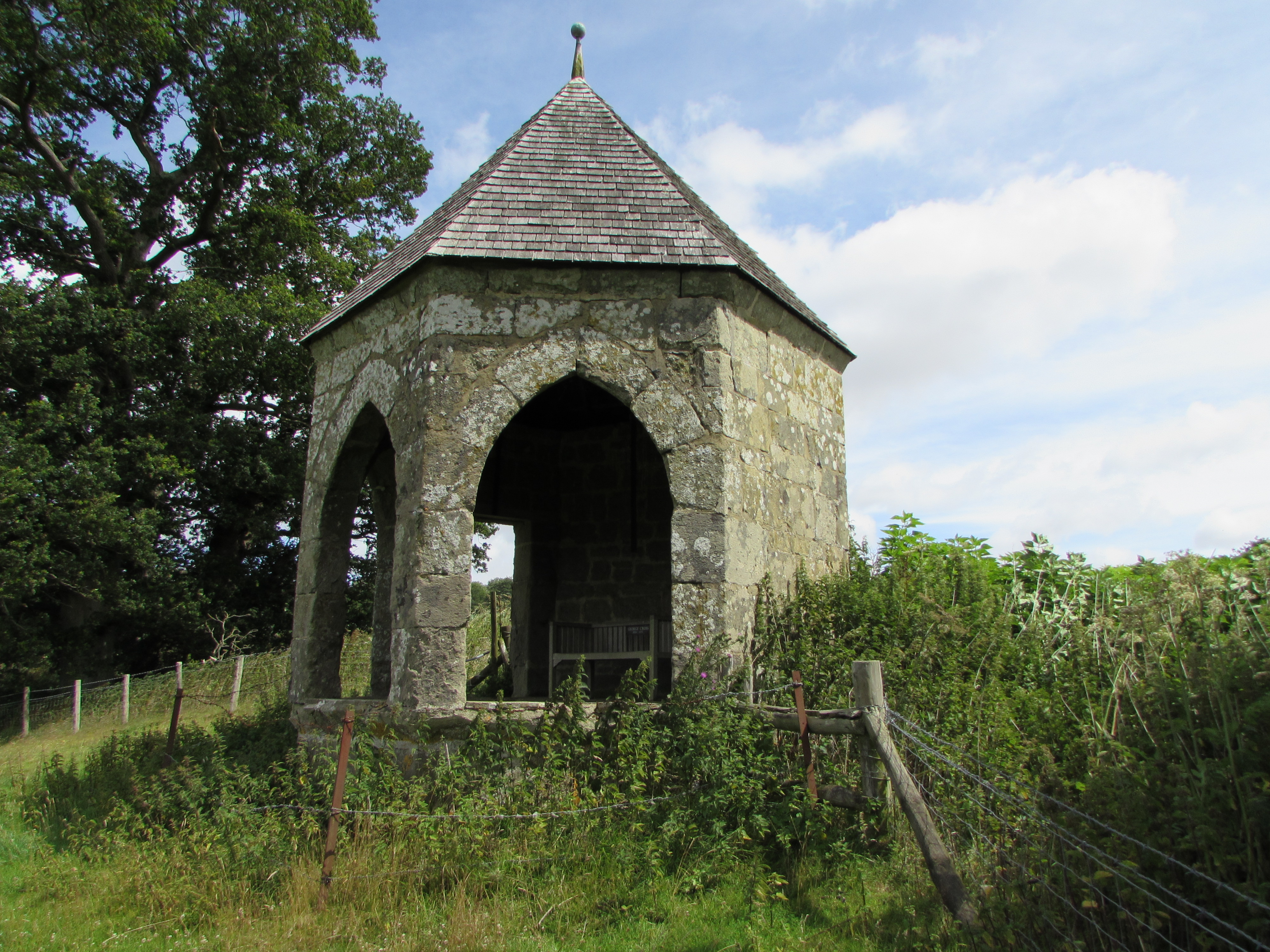
The folly

The house is set in parkland, once a medieval deer park, overlooking a lake formed by damming a stream running north into the River Nadder. The park contains a folly in the form of a summer house at 51.07114°N 1.95523°W.

== Notable occupants ==
- Sir George Penruddock (died 1581), High Sheriff of Wiltshire 1561–2; MP for Salisbury in 1553, Wiltshire in 1558 and 1572, and Downton in 1571
- Sir Edward Penruddock (died 1614), son of Sir George; High Sheriff of Wiltshire 1598–9; MP for Weymouth in 1584 and Wilton in 1586
- Sir Robert Penruddock (died 1615), also son of Sir George; MP for Wilton in 1589 and 1597, and Ludgershall in 1601
- John Penruddock (died 1601), MP for Wilton and Southampton
- Sir John Penruddocke (died 1648), High Sheriff in 1643
- Colonel John Penruddock (1619–1655), a Royalist who took part in the failed 1655 Penruddock uprising against Oliver Cromwell, was tried and executed at Exeter on 16 May 1655.
- Thomas Penruddocke (died 1698), MP for Wilton in 1679 and 1689, Deputy Lieutenant for Wiltshire in 1683
- Charles Penruddocke (1743–1788), High Sheriff of Wiltshire in 1750–1, MP for Wiltshire from 1770 to 1788
- John Hungerford Penruddocke (1770–1841), High Sheriff, MP for Wilton 1821 to 1837
- Charles Penruddocke (died 1899), High Sheriff in 1861–2
- Charles Penruddocke (died 1929), son of Charles (d. 1899), High Sheriff in 1913–4
