= Penruddock (surname) =

Penruddock is an English surname. Notable people with the surname include:

- George Penruddock (by 1527–1581), Member of Parliament for Salisbury, Wiltshire and Pembroke
- John Penruddock (bef.1542-1601), Member of Parliament for Wilton and Southampton
- John Penruddock (1619–1655), Cavalier, leader of the Penruddock uprising in 1655
- Robert Penruddock, Member of Parliament for Cumberland
- Thomas Penruddock (c.1578-1637), Member of Parliament for Downton and Cumberland

== See also ==
- Penruddocke
