= Penruddocke =

Penruddocke is a surname. Notable people with the name include:

- Charles Penruddocke (1743–1788), English politician, member of Parliament of England
- John Penruddocke (1770–1841), English politician, member of Parliament of the United Kingdom, son of Charles Penruddocke
- Thomas Penruddocke (b. c. 1648, d. before 1695), English politician, member of Parliament of England

== See also ==
- Penruddock
