= Compton Chamberlayne =

Village in Wiltshire, England

Coordinates: 51.069°N 1.960°W

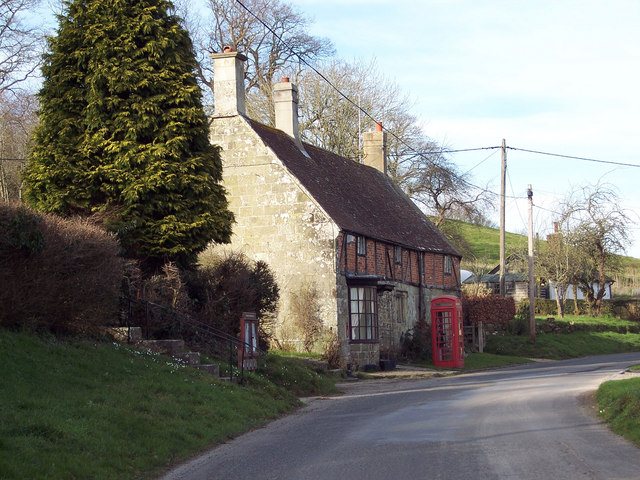
- Compton Chamberlayne

- Location within Wiltshire
- Population: 112 (in 2011)
- OS grid reference: SU029300
- Unitary authority: Wiltshire
- Ceremonial county: Wiltshire
- Region: South West
- Country: England
- Sovereign state: United Kingdom
- Post town: Salisbury
- Postcode district: SP3
- Dialling code: 01722
- Police: Wiltshire
- Fire: Dorset and Wiltshire
- Ambulance: South Western
- UK Parliament: Salisbury

Compton Chamberlayne is a small village and civil parish in the Nadder Valley in south Wiltshire, England, about 7 miles (11 km) west of Salisbury. The Nadder forms the northern boundary of the parish; to the south are chalk hills. It is bisected by the A30 road. The village contains some 25 privately owned houses, a village hall, and a cricket pitch used by Compton Chamberlayne Cricket Club.

== History ==
Most of the inhabited part of the village lies in a small wooded valley that lends credence to the origin of the name "Compton" – coombe tun, or "settlement in a wooded valley". "Chamberlayne" seems to have been attached when a Robert le Chamberlayne, or possibly Geoffrey le Chaumberlang, took possession of the village in the Middle Ages. The village was recorded in the Domesday Book of 1086, which shows that the local manor had a mill, some pastureland, meadows and two woods at that time. Today there is no evidence of the manor.

There was a day school in the village in 1819, which had 60 pupils in 1859; around that time it was funded entirely by the Penruddock family of Compton House. By 1871, government grants were received under the National School system. The school closed in 1933 as pupil numbers fell.

== Map of Australia ==
During World War I, thousands of Australian and Canadian troops camped in the fields to the north of the chalk downland, before being shipped to France for combat. Compton Chamberlayne burial ground has 28 graves of Australian soldiers who died, believed to be of influenza, during their transit through the camp. There is still today a field called "hospital", previously the site of the military medical facility. The only tangible sign of the previous occupation was an outline of Australia carved in the surface of the chalk downs (grid reference SU 04298 29163) to the south-east of the village, which was left to grass over in 2005. In 2018/2019, a group of local volunteers restored the map and marked Anzac Day with a service there. The map is 150 feet (46 m) wide and about 125 feet (38 m) high. It is protected as a scheduled monument on the list published by Historic England.

The neighbouring village of Fovant also has an impressive display of army regimental badges carved into the chalk downs.

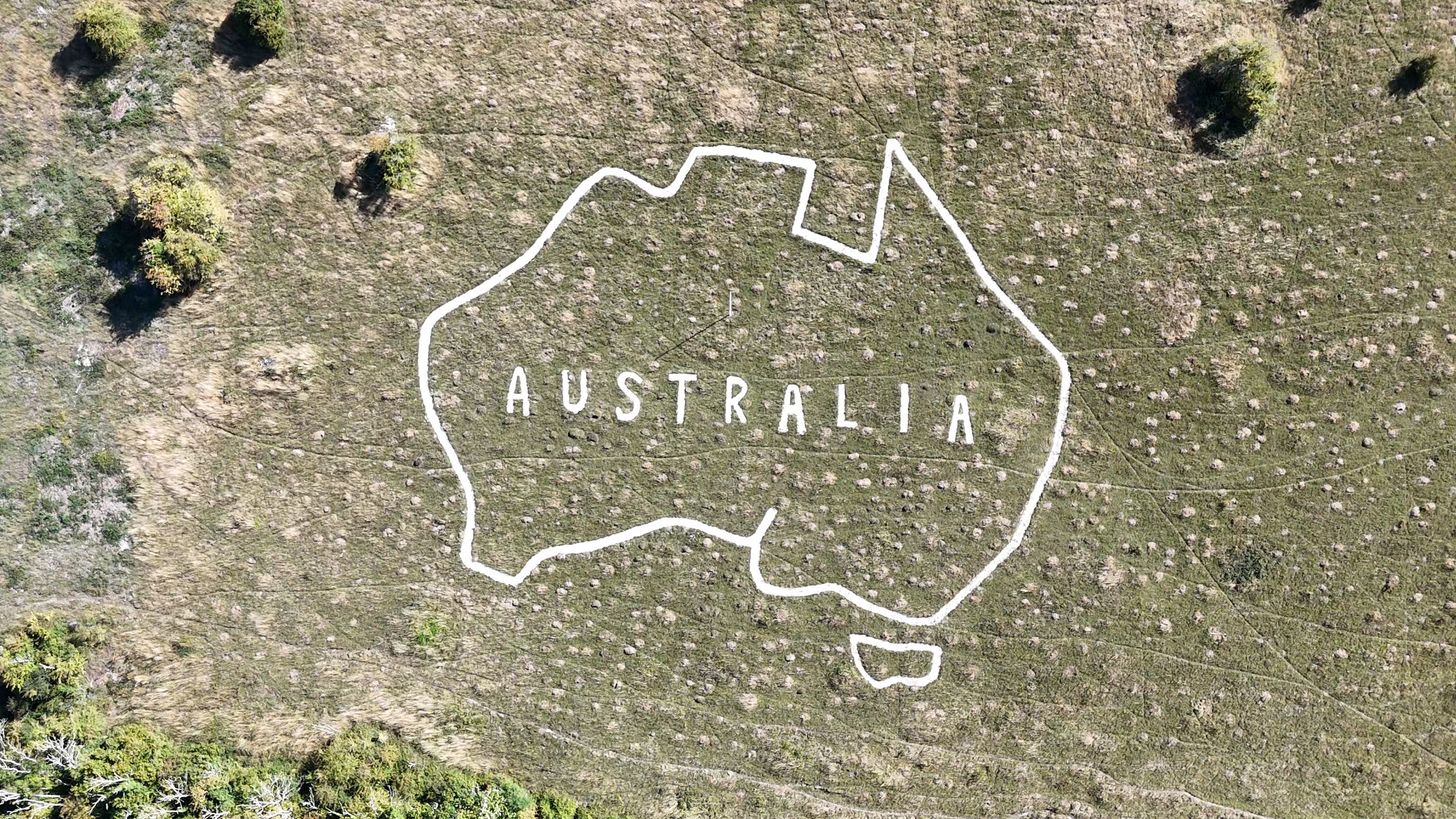
The map in 2025

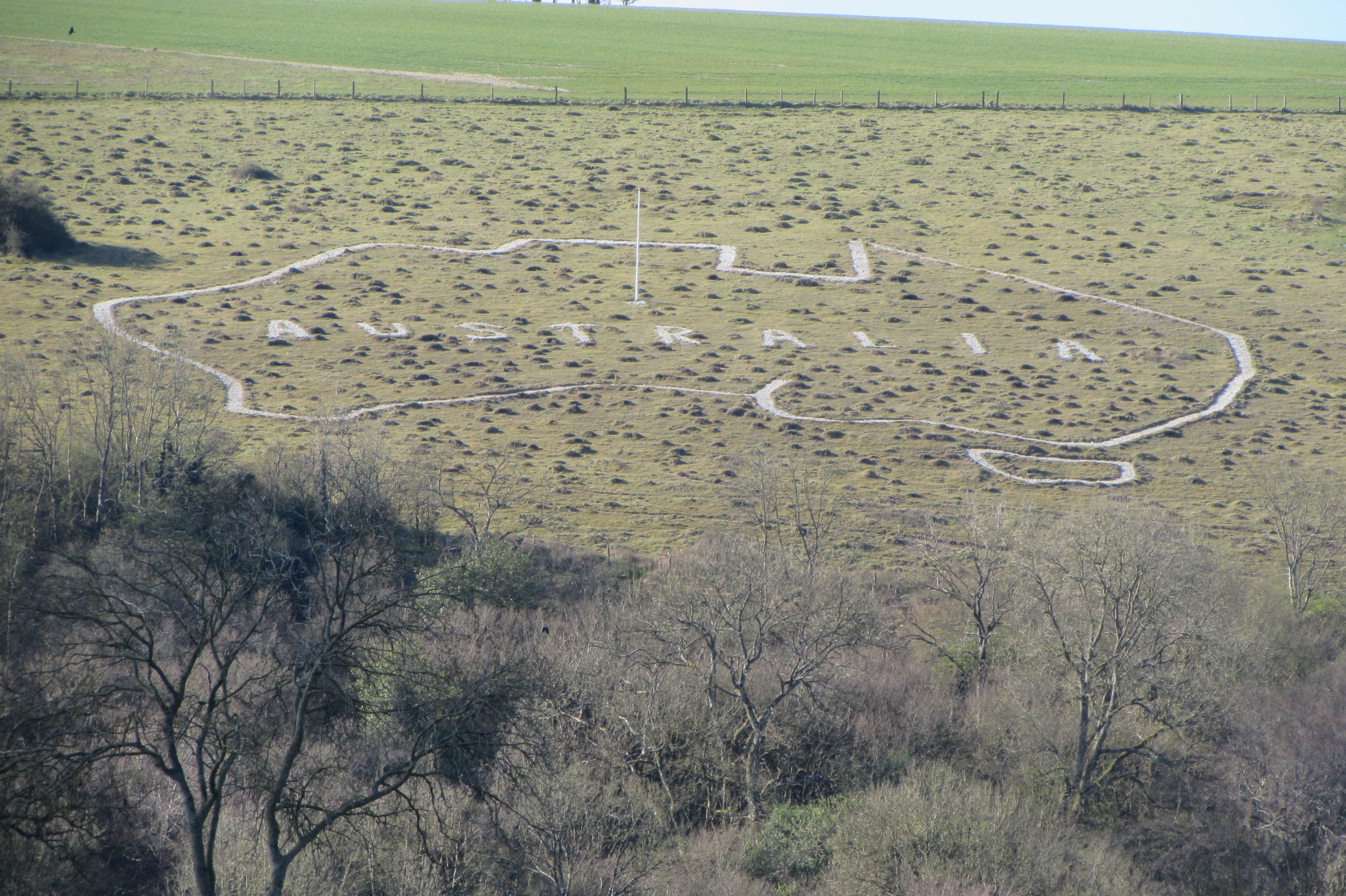
The restored map of Australia (2021)

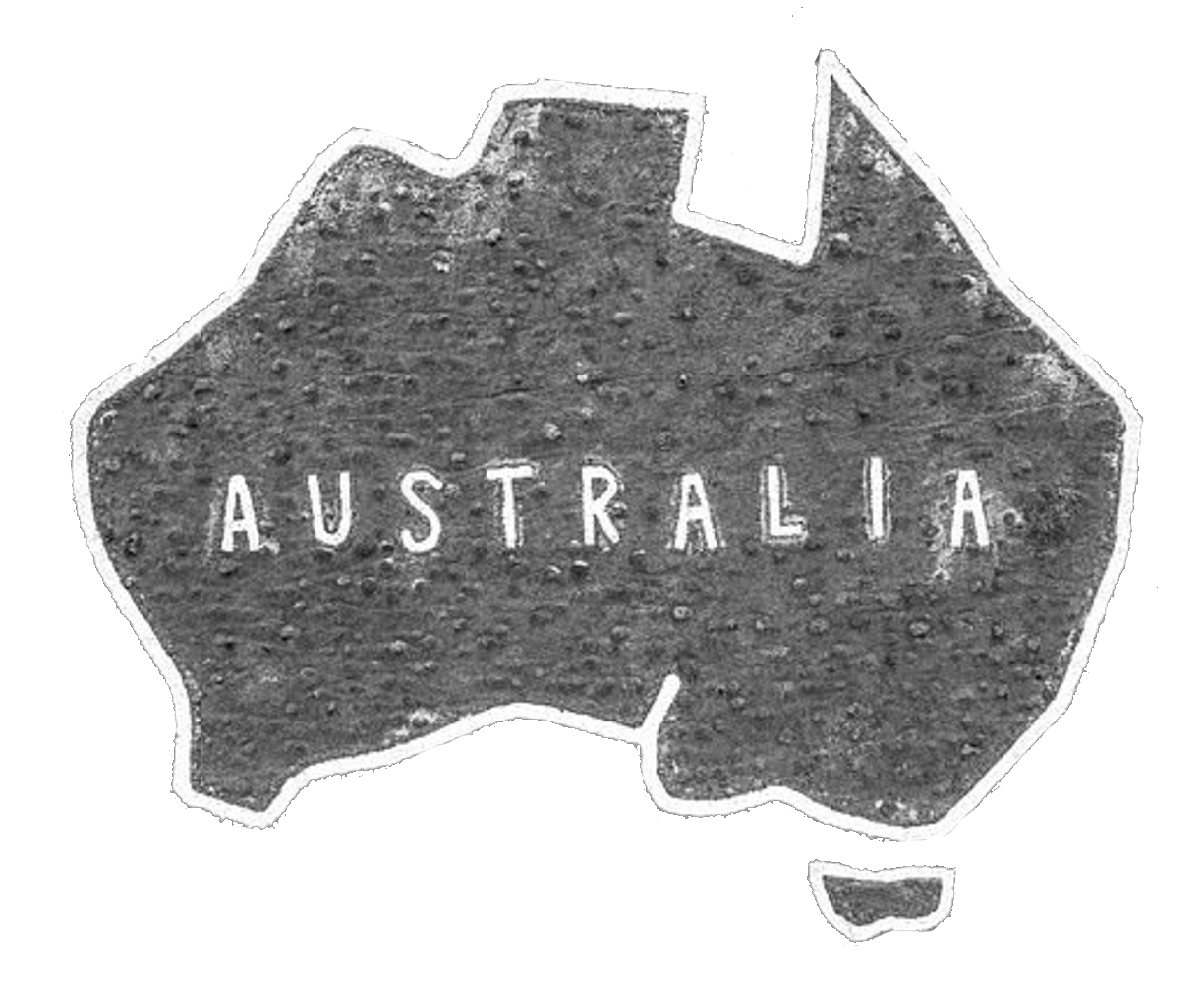
The map in black and white

== Parish church ==
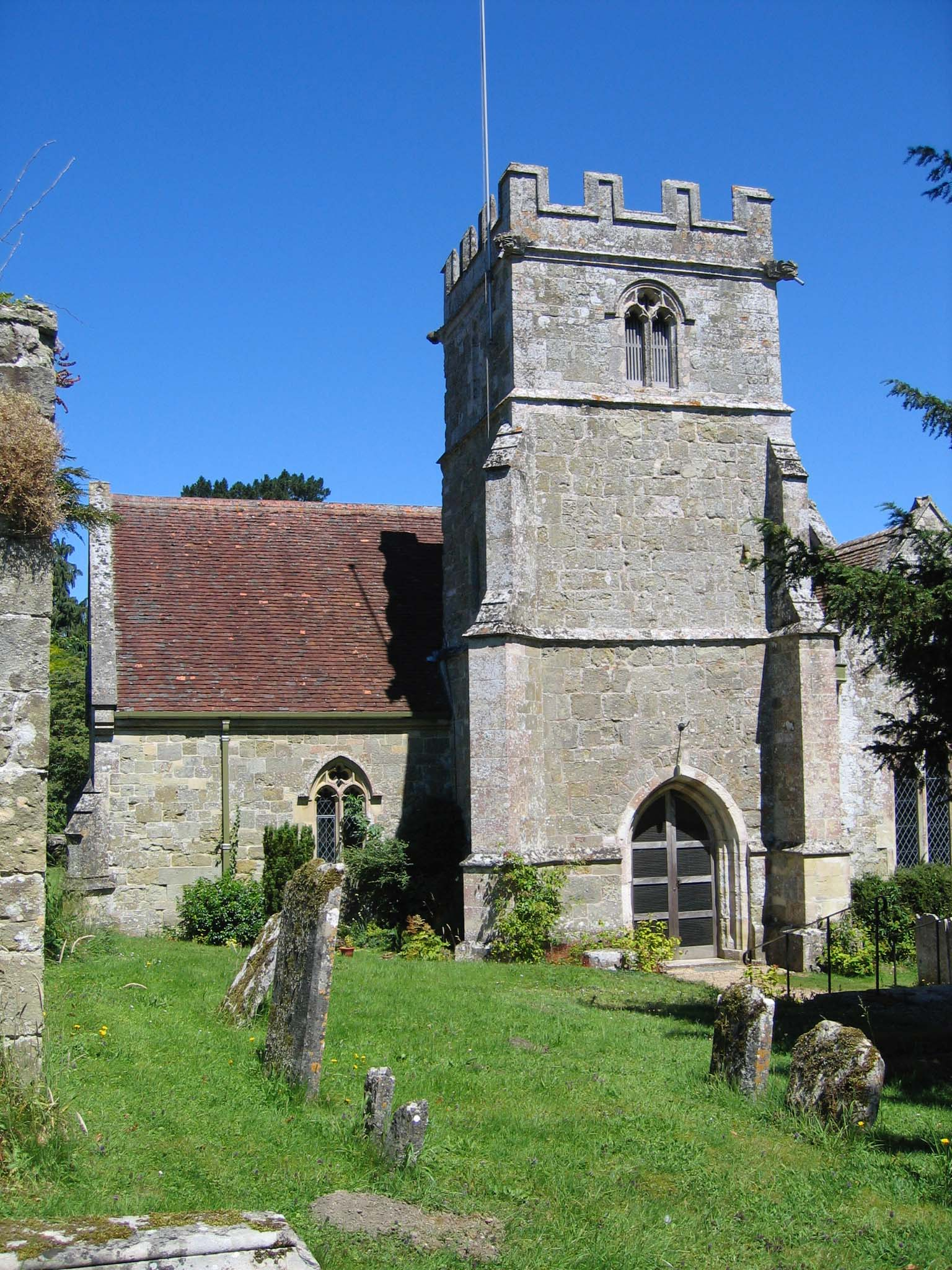
St Michael's Church

The Anglican Church of St Michael, close to Compton House, was built at the end of the 13th century in the Early English style, at the same time as Salisbury Cathedral some seven miles away. Further work was done in the 14th and 15th centuries, with restoration in 1877 by James Soppitt of Shaftesbury. It contains the Penruddocke family vault and has a peal of six bells, two dating from the 17th century and four from the 19th.

The church is a Grade II* listed building. The benefice is served by the Nadder Valley team ministry.

== Compton House and Park ==
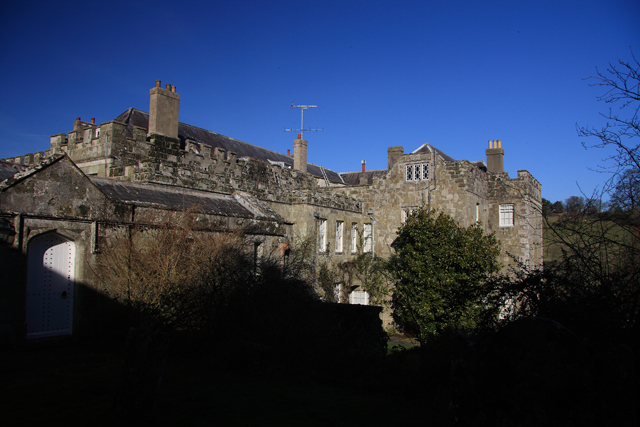
Compton House

Compton Park House is a Grade I listed country house on the northern edge of the village, which was a seat of the Penruddocke (or Penruddock) family from the mid-16th century until 1930. It stands in a former deer park with two artificial lakes.

== Notable residents ==
- Sir George Penruddock (died 1581), High Sheriff of Wiltshire; MP for Salisbury, Wiltshire and Downton
- John Penruddock (died 1601), MP for Wilton and Southampton
- Edward Penruddock, High Sheriff in 1597
- Sir John Penruddocke (died 1648), High Sheriff in 1643
- Colonel John Penruddock (1619–1655), a Royalist who took part in the failed 1655 Penruddock uprising against Oliver Cromwell, was tried and executed at Exeter on 16 May 1655.
- Thomas Penruddocke (born c. 1648, died before 1695), MP for Wilton
- Charles Penruddocke (died 1788), High Sheriff in 1751
- Charles Penruddocke (1743–1788), High Sheriff, MP for Wiltshire
- John Penruddocke (1770–1841), High Sheriff, MP for Wilton
- Charles Penruddocke (died 1899), High Sheriff in 1861

== See also ==
- List of hill figures in Wiltshire
