= River Crane =

River Crane may refer to several places:

- River Crane, London, a tributary of the River Thames, London, England
- River Crane, Dorset, a river in Dorset, England

== See also ==
- Crane River, Manitoba, Canada, a community
