= Greywell =

Village and parish in Hampshire, England

Coordinates: 51.253518°N 0.975456°W

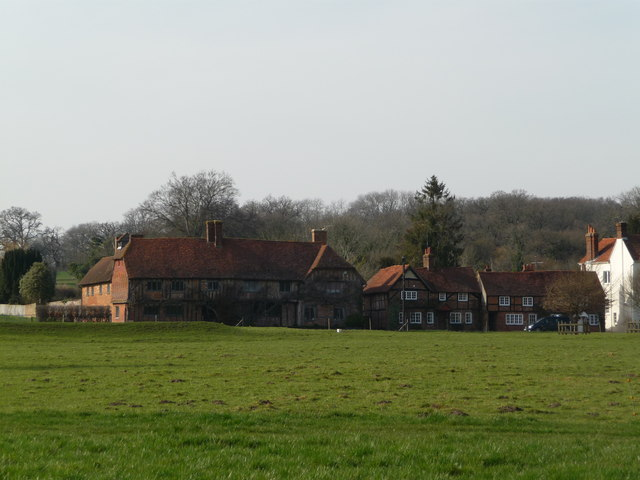
- Cottages in Greywell

- Location within Hampshire
- Population: 237 (2011 Census)
- OS grid reference: SU7159750982
- Civil parish: Greywell
- District: Hart
- Shire county: Hampshire
- Region: South East
- Country: England
- Sovereign state: United Kingdom
- Post town: HOOK
- Postcode district: RG29
- Dialling code: 01256
- Police: Hampshire and Isle of Wight
- Fire: Hampshire and Isle of Wight
- Ambulance: South Central
- UK Parliament: North East Hampshire

Greywell is a small village and civil parish in Hampshire, England – a past winner of the Best Kept Village in Hampshire competition and a recent winner of Best Small Village in Hampshire. It lies on the west bank of the River Whitewater, 6 miles east of Basingstoke and 1.5 miles west of Odiham. The area is popular with walkers and cyclists. Many photographers also take pictures of some of the local architecture. There are 29 Grade II listed buildings or entries in the area, and 2 Grade II* listed buildings. The nearby medieval Odiham Castle is of historical interest. At the centre of the village is the Fox and Goose public house.

== History ==
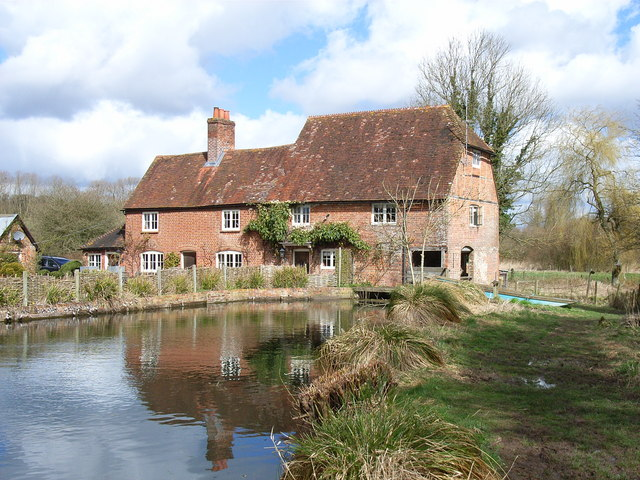
Greywell Mill on the upper reaches of the River Whitewater. The old waterwheel is still to be seen at the right-hand end of the building.

The village was not recorded in the Domesday Book, possibly being considered part of the manor of Odiham. Becoming a separate manor in the 13th century, it was sold to Guy Carleton, 1st Baron Dorchester, and the first Governor General of Canada in 1786, and has stayed in that family ever since.

Originally a Saxon hunting settlement, the village's economy is rooted in agriculture and more latterly timber, which flourished at the same time as the Basingstoke Canal. Built at the end of the 18th century, it runs through and under Greywell. However, the canal was never a commercial success and was soon overtaken by the advent of the railway; by the turn of the last century it had fallen into disuse. These days, agriculture remains the most important local industry, but most residents work elsewhere, commute to London or are retired.

== Greywell Hill House ==
In the 17th century, Nateley and Greywell manors were owned by the Zouche family of Bramshill, then the Henley family. The 876 acres of Greywell Manor were bought in 1787 by Guy Carleton, 1st Baron Dorchester, former Governor General of Quebec. Trustees who purchased the Manor for Guy Carleton described it as "A delightful spot... charming hills much woods, good water, a small river in the bottom with good Trout... the Farm buildings in most excellent condition."

There were three farms in the Manor, of which Grewell Farm was probably the least significant. An estate survey of 1788 shows the line of the tunnel for the Basingstoke Canal which crosses the north of the estate. The farm was tenanted, Guy Carleton choosing to live at Kempshott nearby and then in Middlesex. He died in 1808 and it was not until around 1824 when the farm had become a gentleman's residence that Arthur Henry Carleton, 2nd Lord Dorchester, finally moved in.

The Greenwood map, 1826, indicates that a formal garden has been started and it is clear that a gentleman's residence would have had pleasure grounds as well. The Tithe map of 1842 shows a mansion, approach drive, stable block, grounds and a surrounding park. The 1st edition OS maps show a partly walled kitchen garden as well as lawns and features such as a fountain and a pond. An old chalk pit to the east of the approach drive has become The Dell. Footpaths lead through the park and there has been much planting of trees in the parkland. An article in the Gardeners' Chronicle, 1907, indicates that the period 1870s – 1890s there was a great deal of planting both of plants and trees. A Dutch garden is described in what was originally the chalk pit (shown on early, old maps).

The title of Lord Dorchester became extinct in 1897, but Henrietta Anne Carleton (by then Mrs Leir-Carleton), daughter of the last Lord Dorchester, applied for reinstatement of the title, which was granted by Queen Victoria in 1899. Henrietta then became the 1st Baroness Dorchester. In its turn, this title became extinct in 1963 when Henrietta's son from her first marriage to Francis Paynton Pigott, died. However, their daughter had already married William James Harris, 6th Earl of Malmesbury. In 2000, William James Harris died and James Carleton Harris became 7th Earl of Malmesbury thus a direct heir of Guy Carleton, 1st Baron Dorchester. He is the current owner of Greywell Hill House.

== St Mary's Church ==
Greywell's church, dedicated to St Mary the Virgin, is an ancient structure of flint with stone quoins and dressings in the Norman and early English styles. It consists of a chancel, nave, porch and tower surmounted by wooden belfry containing four bells.

At the time of the Domesday Survey in 1086 it is thought that the Chapel of St.Mary, beside the Whitewater, was one of the two churches within the Manor of Odiham mentioned in the survey. The church is of Norman origin and was built in the 12th century.

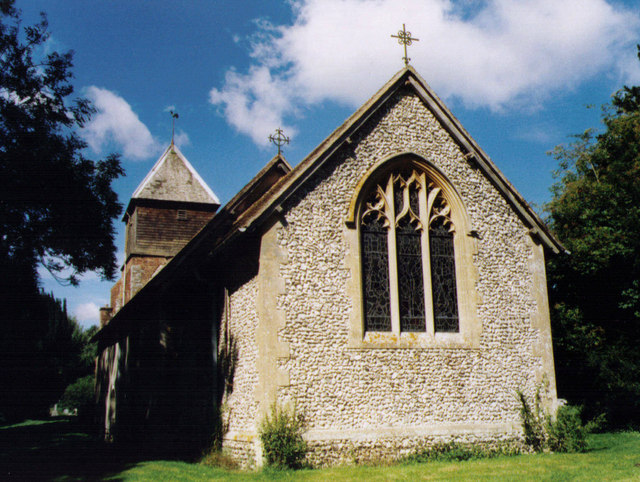
St Mary's Church, Greywell

Restored in 1870, it still boasts many old features, the most important of which is the early 16th century rood-screen, made of carved oak which before the restoration was used as a men's gallery with rood loft and circular stairs. The narrow 13th-century Early English chancel arch is also a prominent feature, while on the stonework to the left outside the church door there are visible remains of several consecration crosses dating back to the period of the Crusades. Church Cottage, beside the lych-gate on The Street, is believed to have been originally the priest's lodgings. St Mary's Church in Greywell is part of the United Parish of Newnham with Nately Scures with Mapledurwell with Up Nately with Greywell, which in turn is part of the North Hampshire Downs Benefice in the Church of England Diocese of Winchester.

Greywell is within the Anglican United Parish, which is served by St Swithun's, Nately Scures.

== Greywell Tunnel ==
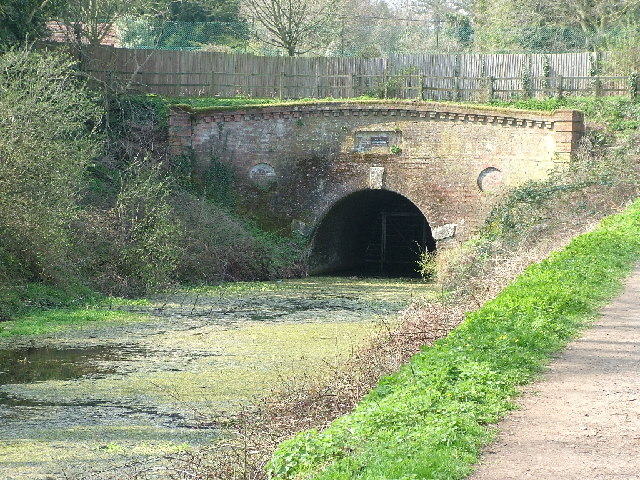
Eastern portal of the Greywell Tunnel, in Greywell village

The Basingstoke Canal runs beneath the village through the Greywell Tunnel, a 1,230-yard (1,120 m) tunnel built in the late 18th century. The last commercial passage of the tunnel was in 1914; a roof fall in 1932 led to the tunnel becoming totally blocked. The disused western portal of the tunnel is the largest winter bat roost in the UK, and is the second largest colony of Natterer's bat in Europe. Along with Greywell Moors, the tunnel and its bat colony form one of two Sites of Special Scientific Interest in the area. A short section of the canal still in water, leading from the western tunnel portal with the original towpath, is maintained as a nature reserve.

== Notable residents ==
By date of birth:

- Guy Carleton, 1st Baron Dorchester (1724–1808)
- Maria Fetherstonhaugh (née Carleton) (1847–1918), romantic novelist
- Thomas Dawson, driver, Army Service Corps
- William Harris, 6th Earl of Malmesbury (1907–2000)
- Bill Newton Dunn (born 1941), Politician
- Tom Newton Dunn (born 1973), Journalist
- James Carleton Harris, 7th Earl of Malmesbury (born 1946)
- Richard James Anthony Noble (born 1946), Entrepreneur
- Nick Jeffery (born 1968), Chief Executive Officer of Vodafone UK
