= Ebblake Bog =

Bog in Dorset and Hampshire, England

Coordinates: 50.862°N 1.852°W

- Site of Special Scientific Interest
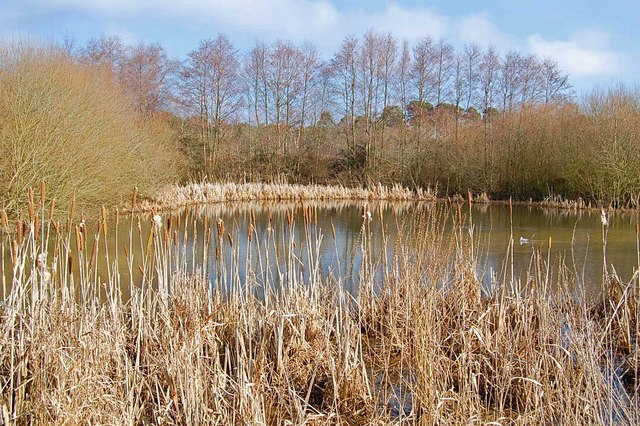
- Location of Ebblake Bog.
- Area of search: Dorset; Hampshire
- Grid reference: SU 105 070
- Interest: Biological
- Area: 11.3 hectares (28 acres)
- Notification date: 1985
- Location map: Magic Map

Ebblake Bog is a 11.3-hectare (28-acre) biological Site of Special Scientific Interest in Dorset and Hampshire, located west of Ringwood. It is part of Dorset Heathlands Ramsar site and Special Protection Area, and of Dorset Heaths Special Area of Conservation,

This mire in the valley of the Moors River has a deep layer of peat. It is dominated by willow, bog myrtle, purple moor grass and Sphagnum mosses and there are several shallow pools.

== See also ==
- Ebblake
