= Edward Baker (British politician) =

British politician

Edward Baker (9 August 1774 – 24 February 1862) was an English Conservative politician. He was the Member of Parliament (MP) for Wilton in Wiltshire from 1823 to 1830. He was re-elected unopposed at the 1837 general election, but stood down from the House of Commons at the 1841 general election.

From a Salisbury family of some social standing, Baker was educated at St John's College, Cambridge, but did not graduate. He was an officer in the militia and a justice of the peace. He was Mayor of Wilton in 1826–27. He was an aide-de-camp to William IV and to Queen Victoria from 1831 to 1857.

Parliament of the United Kingdom
Preceded by Ralph Sheldon; John Penruddocke	Member of Parliament for Wilton; 1823–1830; With: John Penruddocke	Succeeded by Henry Bulwer; John Penruddocke
Preceded by John Penruddocke	Member of Parliament for Wilton; 1837 – 1841	Succeeded by Viscount FitzHarris
