= Maria Fetherstonhaugh =

English novelist (1847–1918)

Hon. Maria Georgiana Fetherstonhaugh (née Carleton) (1847–3 August 1918) was an English novelist, known also as Minna Carleton. A modern critic concludes that her novels, "when not marred by over-wrought sentiment... have vitality.... Her women characters are often more resolute, noble and practical than the men."

== Personal life ==
Maria was born at Greywell, Hampshire, the younger daughter of Guy Carleton, 3rd Baron Dorchester (1811–1875), and his wife Anna (née Wauchope). She made an early marriage on 4 July 1863 to Timothy Fetherstonhaugh (1840–1908) of Kirkoswald, Cumberland, a former captain of the 13th Hussars, son of Timothy Fetherstonhaugh (1811–1856) and Eliza Were, née Clarke (1816–1895). Their daughter Mabel was born in 1871.

Some years after, she and her sister Henrietta Anne Pigott, later Baroness Dorchester, are known to have been working as readers for the London publishing firm of Bentley, which also issued Maria's novels.

== Baden-Powell ==
Little is known of her private life, but the Fetherstonhaughs were admirers of Robert Baden-Powell (1857–41), founder of the Boy Scout movement, whom they had met on holiday in Malta. According to a newspaper article about Powell's Scouting for Boys, "In 1905 [Maria] had bought the Mill House, behind Wimbledon Windmill... as a retreat where she could keep her unusual menagerie including monkeys and penguins." This became for Baden-Powell "a quiet getaway where he could write his new book," which appeared in its final form in 1908. The article also states that "the Fetherstonhaughs had a somewhat troubled marriage."

== Death ==
Maria Fetherstonhaugh died on 3 August 1918.

== Novels ==
Fetherstonhaugh's novels include Kilcorran (1877), Kingsdene (1878), Robin Adair (1879), Alan Dering (1880), For Old Sake's Sake (1882), Dream Faces (1884) and Laying Down the Cards (1890). They can be faulted for sentimentality and "effusive verse quotation", but have vitality and feature "lively, outspoken, unusual heroines". However, self-sacrifice is denoted as part of a woman's role. These are generally available print-on-demand.
