= Moors River =

River in east Dorset, England

Coordinates: 50°45′N 1°49′W

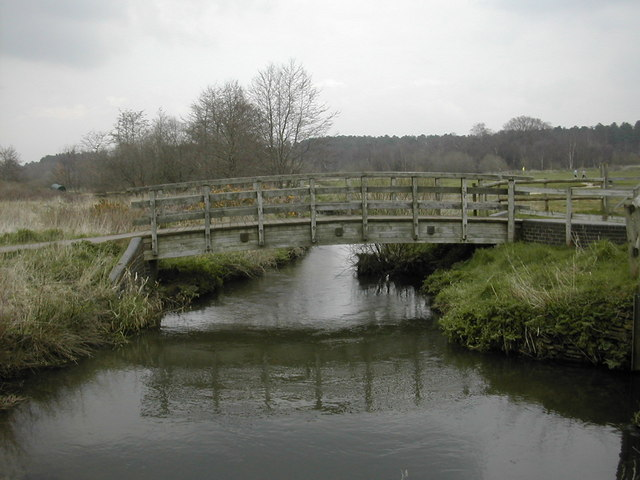
Moors River at Moors Valley Country Park

The Moors River is a river in east Dorset, England, which starts at the point where the River Crane and the Ebblake Stream meet, at Ebblake, south of Verwood.

It runs south then southeast, past Bournemouth Airport and Hurn to join the River Stour at Blackwater, Dorset.

It is well known to dragonfly enthusiasts as the last site in Britain where Orange-spotted Emerald occurred.
