= John Penruddocke =

British politician (1770–1841)

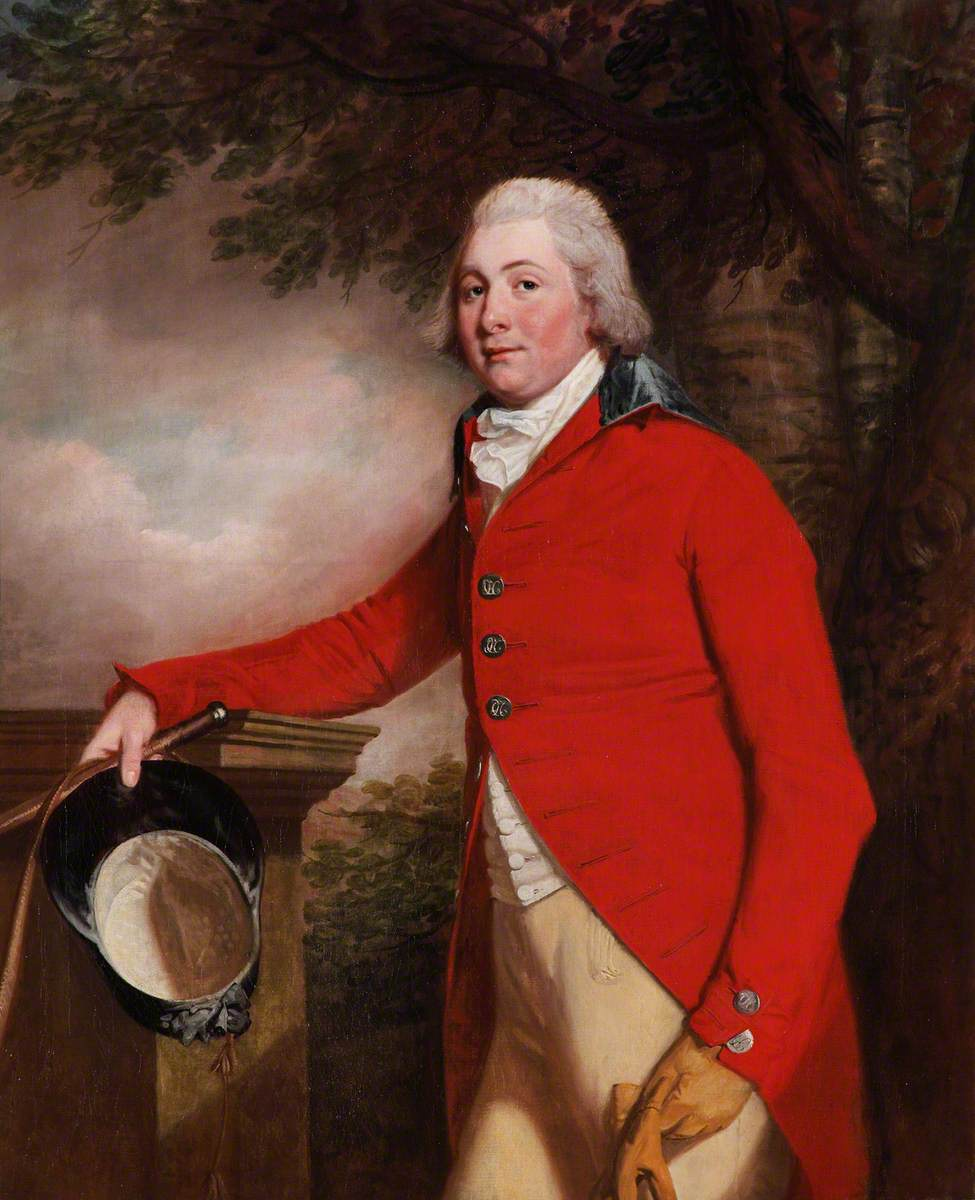
John Hungerford Penruddock (1770–1841), MP, DL, of Compton Chamberlayne by Thomas Beach (1738–1806)

John Hungerford Penruddocke (23 January 1770 – 25 December 1841) was a Tory politician in the United Kingdom.

== Family ==
Penruddocke was the eldest son of Charles Penruddocke (died 1788) of Compton Chamberlayne, Wiltshire, and Anne Henrietta, daughter of Wadham Wyndham of Fyfield, also in Wiltshire. He was educated at Harrow School (from 1785) and New College, Oxford (from 1789). He married on 3 October 1789 Maria Anne, daughter of John Pearse of Chute Standen, Wiltshire. They had no children; she died on 5 April 1831. On his death he left his estate, including Compton House, to his great-nephew Charles (1828–1899).

== Public life ==
Penruddocke commanded the Hindon troop of the volunteer Wiltshire Yeoman Cavalry from 1799. He was High Sheriff of Wiltshire for 1817–18 and Mayor of Wilton in 1818–19.

He was Member of Parliament (MP) for Wilton from 1823 until he stood down at the 1837 general election. He was a general supporter of the Liverpool ministry. In February 1829 he was listed by Joseph Planta, the patronage secretary, as "opposed to the principle" of the ministry's Catholic emancipation bill. He also voted against Jewish emancipation on 17 May of that year. After the Great Reform, he sat for Wilton as a Conservative from 1832 to his retirement in 1837.

== Memorial ==
The names of John Hungerford Pennruddocke and of his wife Mary Anne appear on the family's memorial tablet in St Michael's Church, Compton Chamberlayne.

Parliament of the United Kingdom
Preceded by Ralph Sheldon; Viscount FitzHarris	Member of Parliament for Wilton; 1821 – 1837; With: Ralph Sheldon to 1823; Edward Baker 1823–1830; Henry Bulwer 1830–1831; James Dawkins 1831–1832	Succeeded by Edward Baker
