= William Harris, 6th Earl of Malmesbury =

British peer

William James Harris, 6th Earl of Malmesbury TD KStJ DL JP (18 November 1907 – 11 November 2000), styled Viscount FitzHarris until 1950, was a British peer.

The son of James Harris, 5th Earl of Malmesbury, Harris was educated at Eton and Trinity College, Cambridge and, as a surveyor, joined and served in the Royal Hampshire Regiment. After leaving the army, he served in a variety of positions, all of which involved forestry, agriculture, or surveying work. He succeeded his father in the earldom in 1950. He was Deputy Lieutenant of Hampshire in 1957. In 1973 he became Lord Lieutenant of Hampshire, a position he held until 1982. From 1966 to 1974 he was Official Verderer of the New Forest.

He was awarded the Territorial Decoration in 1944. He was appointed a Knight of the Order of Saint John in 1973.

He sat in the House of Lords as a Conservative Party peer from 9 May 1951 to 11 November 1999.

The family seat was Greywell Hill House, near Farnham in Hampshire.

Lord Malmesbury married firstly, the Honourable Diana Carleton (1912–1990), daughter of Dudley Carleton, 2nd Baron Dorchester, on 7 July 1932. They had three children:,

- Lady Sylvia Veronica Anthea Harris (b. 17 May 1934), married John Maltby, son of Air Vice Marshal Sir Paul Copeland Maltby, and had issue.
- Lady Nell Carleton Harris (b. 3 July 1937), married Captain Michael Boyle, descendant of Henry Boyle, 5th Earl of Shannon and William Edmund Cradock-Hartopp, 3rd Baronet, High Sheriff of Warwickshire, and had issue.
- James Harris, 7th Earl of Malmesbury (b. 19 June 1946), married Sally Ann Rycroft, daughter of Sir Richard Newton Rycroft, 7th Baronet, and had issue.

He married secondly, Margaret Campbell-Preston (d. 1994) in 1991 and thirdly, Bridget Hawkings on 5 July 1996.

He died on 11 November 2000 at age 92.

Honorary titles
Preceded by The Lord Ashburton	Lord Lieutenant of Hampshire; 1973–1982	Succeeded by Sir James Scott, Bt
Peerage of Great Britain
Preceded by James Edward Harris	Earl of Malmesbury; 1950–2000	Succeeded by James Carleton Harris
