= Hurn =

Village in Dorset, England

Coordinates: 50.77245°N 1.82126°W

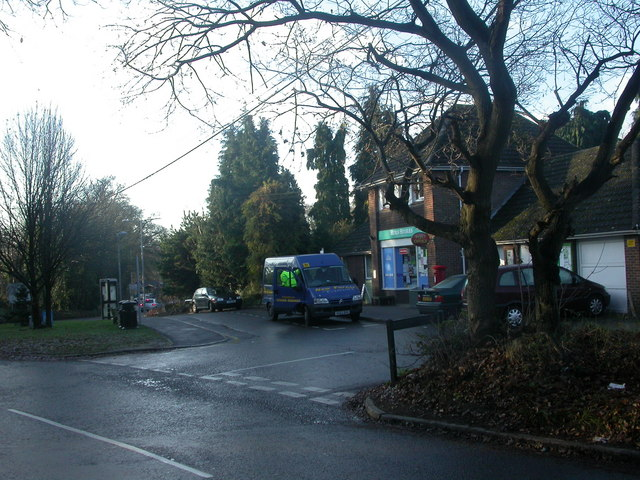
- Hurn village stores

- Location within Dorset
- Population: 468 (2001 Census)
- OS grid reference: SZ127970
- Civil parish: Hurn
- Unitary authority: Bournemouth, Christchurch and Poole
- Ceremonial county: Dorset
- Region: South West
- Country: England
- Sovereign state: United Kingdom
- Post town: CHRISTCHURCH
- Postcode district: BH23
- Police: Dorset
- Fire: Dorset and Wiltshire
- Ambulance: South Western
- UK Parliament: Christchurch

Hurn is a village and civil parish in the Bournemouth, Christchurch and Poole district of Dorset, England. It is situated between the River Stour and River Avon 3 miles (5 km) north-west of Christchurch and 5 miles (8 km) north-east of Bournemouth town centre. In 2001, the village had a population of 468.

Hurn is the location of Bournemouth Airport (originally RAF Station Hurn), an important airfield dating to the Second World War. The village was served by Hurn railway station from 1863 to 1935, and the station building and platform are extant. They are now used as the Avon Causeway Hotel.

Hurn is listed in the Domesday Book as "Herne" (in the Egheiete Hundred of Hantescire), and was later known in the 13th century as Hyrne and in the 14th century as Hurne. The name is derived from the old English "hyrne", which means a disused part of a field or the land sectioned by an oxbow lake.

Hurn Court is a Grade II listed manor house, formerly home to the Earls of Malmesbury.

== Governance and politics ==
Hurn is part of the Christchurch parliamentary constituency for elections to the House of Commons. It is currently represented by Conservative MP Christopher Chope.

Hurn is in the Bournemouth, Christchurch and Poole unitary authority. For elections to the council, it is part of Commons electoral ward.

Historically, Hurn was in Hampshire until 1974. From 1894 to 1932 it was in Christchurch Rural District, and from 1932 to 1974 it was in Ringwood and Fordingbridge Rural District. From 1974 to 2019, it was part of Christchurch Borough in the two-tier non-metropolitan county of Dorset, administered at the higher tier by Dorset County Council.
