= James Harris, 5th Earl of Malmesbury =

British peer and conservative politician

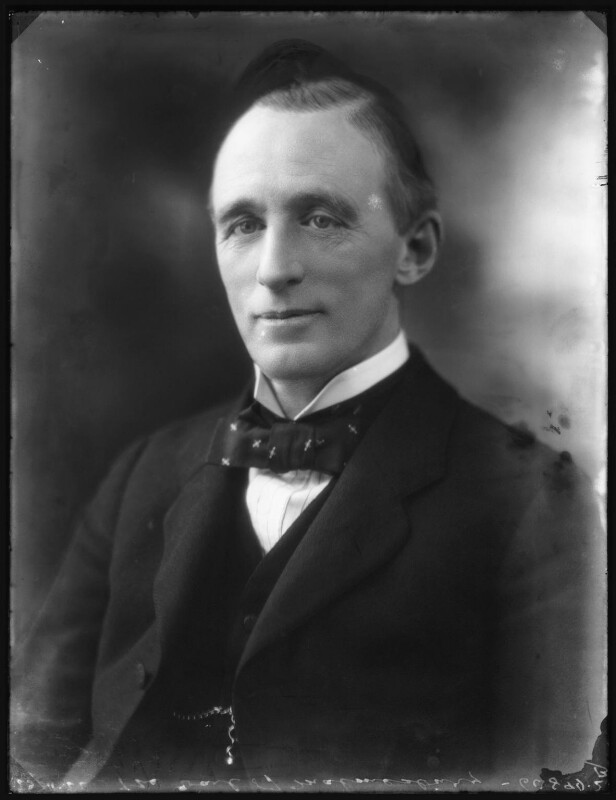
Lord Malmesbury

James Edward Harris, 5th Earl of Malmesbury DL (18 December 1872 – 12 June 1950), styled Viscount FitzHarris from 1889 to 1899, was a British peer and conservative politician.

Malmesbury was the eldest son of Edward Harris, 4th Earl of Malmesbury, and succeeded to the earldom in 1899. Through his grandmother Emma Wylly Chambers he was a descendant of David Mathews, the Loyalist Mayor of New York City during the American Revolutionary War and a descendant of the American Dutch Schuyler family.

He was commissioned as a Lieutenant in the part-time 3rd (Hampshire Militia) Battalion, Hampshire Regiment, on 18 December 1895 and was promoted to Captain on 3 May 1899, before resigning on 24 December 1902;

He was Assistant Private Secretary (unpaid) to the Under-Secretary of State for the Colonies, the Earl of Onslow, in 1901, and a member of the London County Council from 1904 to 1905.

He had retained his links with the 3rd Hampshires, and the battalion was carrying out its annual training on his estate at Christchurch, Dorset, when World War I broke out in August 1914. He rejoined on 5 September 1914, and served during the war, being seconded to the General Staff in 1916 and ended the war as a Major.

Between 1922 and 1924 he served as a Lord-in-waiting (government whip in the House of Lords) under Bonar Law and then Stanley Baldwin. He then returned to local politics and was Chairman of the Hampshire County Council from 1927 to 1937.

Lord Malmesbury married Dorothy Gough-Calthorpe, daughter of Augustus Gough-Calthorpe, 6th Baron Calthorpe, on 27 April 1905. They had two children:

- Lady Elizabeth Harris (b. 8 January 1906), married John Fremantle, 4th Baron Cottesloe and had issue.
- William James Harris, 6th Earl of Malmesbury (1907–2000)

Lord Malmesbury died in June 1950, aged 77, and was succeeded in the earldom by his only son William.

== Notes ==
Peerage of Great Britain
Preceded by Edward James Harris	Earl of Malmesbury; 1899–1950	Succeeded by William James Harris
