= Ebblake =

Place in Dorset, England

Coordinates: 50.8715°N 1.8517°W

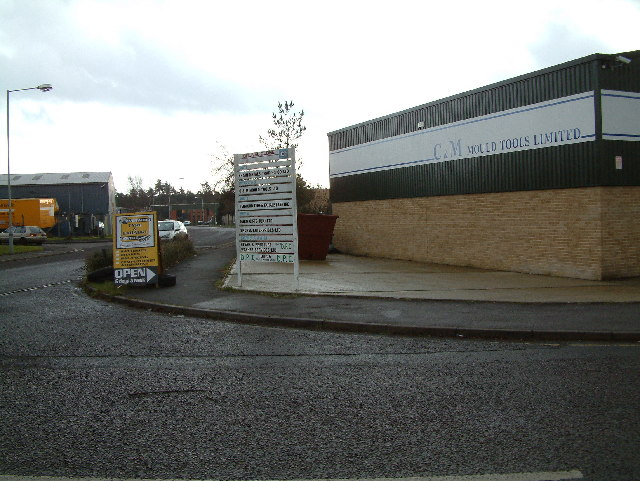
- Ebblake Industrial Estate

- Location within Dorset
- Civil parish: Verwood
- Unitary authority: Dorset
- Ceremonial county: Dorset
- Region: South West
- Country: England
- Sovereign state: United Kingdom
- Police: Dorset
- Fire: Dorset and Wiltshire
- Ambulance: South Western

Ebblake is an area of Verwood, in Dorset, England.

== Places of interest ==
- Ebblake Bog
- Ebblake Industrial Estate

== Politics ==
Ebblake is part of the Verwood ward for elections to Dorset Council.

Ebblake is part of the North Dorset constituency for elections to the House of Commons.
