= Earl of Malmesbury =

Earldom in the Peerage of Great Britain

Earldom of Malmesbury
- Arms: Azure a Chevron Erminois between three Hedgehogs Or on a Chief Argent the Eagle of Prussia displayed Sable beaked legged and langued Gules on the breast the Cypher F.R. and over it the Electoral Cap grasping in the dexter claw a Sceptre and in the sinister a Mound all Or and on each wing a Trefoil slipped of the last
- Creation date: 29 December 1800
- Creation: First
- Created by: George III
- Peerage: Peerage of Great Britain
- First holder: James Harris, 1st Baron Malmesbury
- Present holder: James Carleton Harris, 7th Earl of Malmesbury
- Heir apparent: James Hugh Carleton Harris, Viscount FitzHarris
- Subsidiary titles: Viscount FitzHarris; Baron Malmesbury
- Status: Extant
- Seat: Greywell Hill House
- Former seat: Heron Court

Earl of Malmesbury is a title in the Peerage of Great Britain. It was created in 1800 for the diplomat James Harris, 1st Baron Malmesbury. The son of the grammarian and politician James Harris, he served as Ambassador to Spain, Prussia, Russia and France and also represented Christchurch in the House of Commons. Harris had been created Baron Malmesbury, of Malmesbury in the County of Wiltshire, in 1788. He was made Viscount FitzHarris, of Hurn Court in the County of Southampton, at the same time as he was given the earldom. The earldom and viscountcy were the last creations in the peerage of Great Britain, future titles being made in the peerage of the United Kingdom which took effect three days later.

He was succeeded by his eldest son, the second Earl. He sat as Member of Parliament for Helston, Horsham, Heytesbury and Wilton. His eldest son, the third Earl, was a prominent Conservative politician. He served as Foreign Secretary in 1852 and from 1858 to 1859 and was also Lord Privy Seal and Leader of the House of Lords. Lord Malmesbury died childless and was succeeded by his nephew, the fourth Earl. He was the son of Admiral the Hon. Sir Edward Harris, second son of the second Earl. His eldest son, the fifth Earl, served as a Lord-in-waiting (government whip in the House of Lords) from 1922 to 1924 in the Conservative administrations of Bonar Law and Stanley Baldwin and was later Chairman of the Hampshire County Council. He was succeeded by his only son, the sixth Earl. He was Lord Lieutenant of Hampshire from 1973 to 1982. As of 2010, the titles are held by his only son, the seventh Earl, who succeeded in 2000.

Two other members of the Harris family have also gained distinction. The aforementioned the Hon. Sir Edward Harris (1808–1888), second son of the second Earl, was an admiral in the Royal Navy, held several diplomatic posts and represented Christchurch in Parliament. The Right Reverend the Hon. Charles Amyand Harris (1813–1874), third son of the second Earl, was a clergyman and served as Bishop of Gibraltar from 1868 to 1873.

The present family seat is Greywell Hill House, near Odiham, Hampshire. The former seat was Heron Court (or Hern Court or Hurn Court) at Hurn, near Christchurch, Dorset (although within the historic county boundaries of Hampshire).

== Earls of Malmesbury (1800) ==
- James Harris, 1st Earl of Malmesbury (1746–1820)
- James Edward Harris, 2nd Earl of Malmesbury (1778–1841)
- James Howard Harris, 3rd Earl of Malmesbury (1807–1889)
- Edward James Harris, 4th Earl of Malmesbury (1842–1899)
- James Edward Harris, 5th Earl of Malmesbury (1872–1950)
- William James Harris, 6th Earl of Malmesbury (1907–2000)
- James Carleton Harris, 7th Earl of Malmesbury (b. 1946)

== Present peer ==
James Carleton Harris, 7th Earl of Malmesbury (born 19 June 1946) is the son of the 6th Earl and his wife the Hon. Diana Claudia Patricia Carleton, and was formally styled Viscount FitzHarris between 1950 and 2000. He was educated at Eton College and St Andrew's University. On 14 June 1969 he married Sally Ann Rycroft, daughter of Sir Richard Newton Rycroft, 7th Baronet. On 11 November 2000 he succeeded to his father's peerages. With his wife he has five children:

- James Hugh Carleton Harris, Viscount FitzHarris (born 1970), heir apparent
- Charles Edward Harris (born 1972)
- Guy Richard Harris (born 1975)
- Lady Frances Maria Harris (born 1979)
- Lady Daisy Catherine Harris (born 1981)

The heir apparent's heir is his son James Michael Oswald Harris (b. 1999).

== Jacobite creation ==
On 22 December 1716, Philip Wharton, 1st Duke of Wharton was created Duke of Northumberland, Marquess of Woburn, Earl of Malmesbury and Viscount Winchendon, all in the Jacobite Peerage of England. The peerages, such as they were, became extinct on his death on 1 June 1731.

== Ancestry ==
Ancestors of Earl of Malmesbury

8. Edward Harris, 4th Earl of Malmesbury
4. James Harris, 5th Earl of Malmesbury
9. Sylvia Stewart
2. William Harris, 6th Earl of Malmesbury
10. Augustus Gough-Calthorpe, 6th Baron Calthorpe
5. Hon. Dorothy Gough-Calthorpe
11. Maud Duncombe
1. James Harris, 7th Earl of Malmesbury
12. Francis Pigott
6. Dudley Carleton, 2nd Baron Dorchester
13. Henrietta Carleton, 1st Baroness Dorchester
3. Hon. Diana Carleton
14. William de Blaquiere, 6th Baron de Blaquiere
7. Hon. Kathleen de Blaquiere
15. Lucienne Desbarats
