= James Harris, 3rd Earl of Malmesbury =

British statesman (1807–1889)

The Right Honourable The Earl of Malmesbury GCB PC
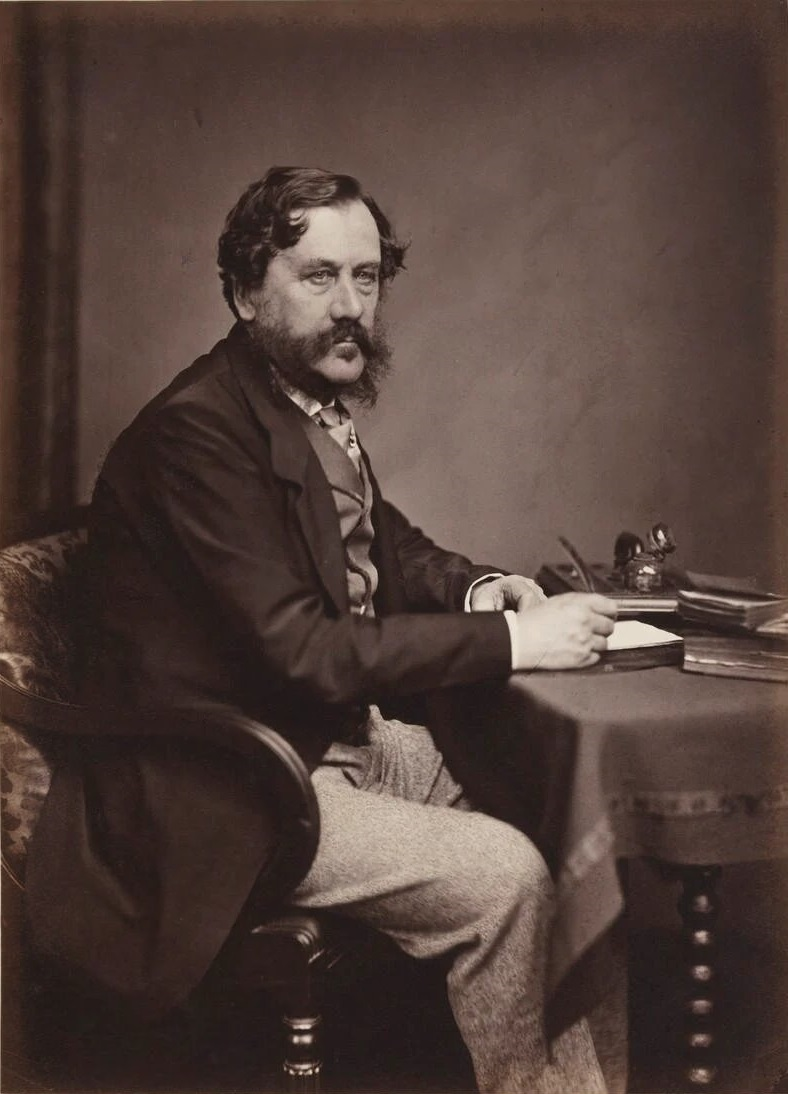
- The 3rd Earl of Malmesbury, c. 1867

Leader of the House of Lords
- In office 27 February 1868 – 1 December 1868
- Monarch: Victoria
- Prime Minister: Benjamin Disraeli
- Preceded by: The Earl of Derby
- Succeeded by: The Earl Granville

Lord Keeper of the Privy Seal
- In office 21 February 1874 – 12 August 1876
- Monarch: Victoria
- Prime Minister: Benjamin Disraeli
- Preceded by: The Viscount Halifax
- Succeeded by: The Earl of Beaconsfield
- In office 6 July 1866 – 1 December 1868
- Monarch: Victoria
- Prime Minister: The Earl of Derby; Benjamin Disraeli
- Preceded by: The Duke of Argyll
- Succeeded by: The Earl of Kimberley

Secretary of State for Foreign Affairs
- In office 26 February 1858 – 18 June 1859
- Monarch: Victoria
- Prime Minister: The Earl of Derby
- Preceded by: The Earl of Clarendon
- Succeeded by: Lord John Russell
- In office 27 February 1852 – 28 December 1852
- Monarch: Victoria
- Prime Minister: The Earl of Derby
- Preceded by: The Earl Granville
- Succeeded by: Lord John Russell

Member of the House of Lords Lord Temporal
- In office 11 September 1841 – 17 May 1889; Hereditary Peerage
- Preceded by: The 2nd Earl of Malmesbury
- Succeeded by: The 4th Earl of Malmesbury

Member of Parliament for Wilton
- In office 22 July 1841 – 10 September 1841
- Preceded by: Edward Baker
- Succeeded by: James Agar

Personal details
- Born: 25 March 1807
- Died: 17 May 1889 (aged 82)
- Party: Conservative
- Spouse(s): 1 Lady Corisande Emma Bennet (d. 1876) (2) Susan Hamilton (d. 1935)
- Education: Oriel College, Oxford

James Howard Harris, 3rd Earl of Malmesbury, GCB, PC (25 March 1807 – 17 May 1889), styled Viscount FitzHarris from 1820 to 1841, was a British statesman of the Victorian era.

== Background and education ==
James Howard Harris was born on 25 March 1807 in London, the eldest son and heir of James Harris, 2nd Earl of Malmesbury, and his wife, Harriet Susan Dashwood, daughter of Francis Bateman Dashwood, of Well Vale, Lincolnshire, and his wife, Teresa March, daughter of John March, of Willeslet Park, Cambridgeshire. Having been educated privately, he went to Eton College, a Public school, and Oriel College, Oxford, graduating from the latter in 1828 with a Bachelor of Arts degree. In the years that followed his graduation, he went travelling around Europe and making acquaintance with aristocratic circles, becoming familiar with Prince Louis Napoleon, who would later become Napoleon III of France.

=== Family ===
Harris married, firstly, on 13 May 1876, Lady Corisande Emma Bennet, daughter of Charles Augustus Bennet, 5th Earl of Tankerville, and his wife Corisanda, daughter of Antoine, duc de Gramont and sister of Agenor, duc de Gramont, who was Minister of Foreign Affairs for France in 1870. She died in 1876. After the death of his first wife, Malmesbury married a second time, on 1 November 1880, to Susan Hamilton, daughter of John Hamilton of Fyne Court, Somerset.

== Political career ==
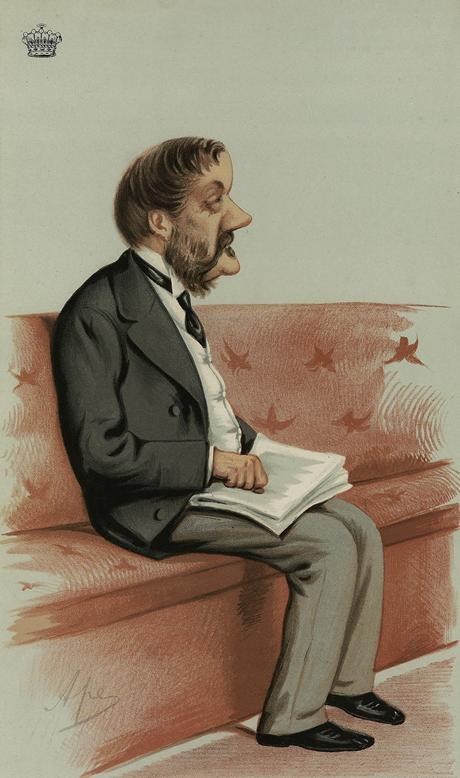
Caricature of James Harris, 3rd Earl of Malmesbury, by Carlo Pellegrini, c. 1874

In 1841 he had only just been elected to the House of Commons for Wilton as a Conservative, when his father died and he succeeded to the peerage. Malmesbury served as Foreign Secretary under the Earl of Derby in 1852 and again from 1858 to 1859 and was also Lord Privy Seal under Derby and Benjamin Disraeli between 1866 and 1868 and under Disraeli between 1874 and 1876. In 1852 he was admitted to the Privy Council. He was regarded as an influential Tory of the old school in the House of Lords at a time when Lord Derby and Disraeli were, in their different ways, moulding the Conservatism of the period.

In his two brief terms as foreign secretary, Malmesbury pursued a cautious, Conservative policy. His friendship with the exiled Louis Napoleon helped lead to quick British acquiescence in the Prince-President's decision to restore the Empire in 1852, but did not prevent Malmesbury from pursuing a policy relatively sympathetic to Austria during the crisis leading up to the Italian War of 1859. Malmesbury was particularly horrified by the behaviour of Cavour, and at the fact that a small country like Piedmont was able so easily to threaten the European peace.

His long life, and the publication of his Memoirs of an Ex-Minister in 1884, contributed to his reputation. The Memoirs, charmingly written, full of anecdote, and containing much interesting material for the history of the time, remain his chief title to remembrance. Lord Malmesbury also edited his grandfather's Diaries and Correspondence (1844), and in 1870 published The First Lord Malmesbury and His Friends.

He was appointed Honorary Colonel of the Hampshire Militia Artillery on 22 June 1854, from which he resigned on 22 November 1884.

== Personal life ==
Lord Malmesbury died childless in May 1889, aged 82, and was succeeded in the earldom by his nephew, Edward Harris.

Parliament of the United Kingdom
Preceded by Edward Baker	Member of Parliament for Wilton; 1841	Succeeded by Viscount Somerton
Political offices
Preceded by The Earl Granville	Foreign Secretary; 1852	Succeeded by The Lord John Russell
Preceded by The Earl of Clarendon	Foreign Secretary; 1858–1859	Succeeded by The Lord John Russell
Preceded by The Duke of Argyll	Lord Privy Seal; 1866–1868	Succeeded by The Earl of Kimberley
Preceded by The Earl of Derby	Leader of the House of Lords; 1868	Succeeded by The Earl Granville
Preceded by The Viscount Halifax	Lord Privy Seal; 1874–1876	Succeeded by The Earl of Beaconsfield
Party political offices
Preceded by The Earl of Derby	Leader of the Conservative Party in the House of Lords; 1868–1869	Succeeded by The Lord Cairns
Peerage of Great Britain
Preceded by James Harris	Earl of Malmesbury; 1841–1889	Succeeded by Edward James Harris
