= James Harris, 2nd Earl of Malmesbury =

British politician (1778–1841)

The Right Honourable The Earl of Malmesbury

Governor of the Isle of Wight
- In office August 1807 – 10 September 1841
- Preceded by: The Lord Bolton
- Succeeded by: The Lord Yarborough

Under-Secretary of State for Foreign Affairs
- In office March 1807 – August 1807
- Preceded by: George Walpole; Sir Francis Vincent
- Succeeded by: Charles Bagot

Personal details
- Born: James Edward Harris; 19 August 1778
- Died: 10 September 1841 (aged 63)
- Spouse: Harriet Susan Dashwood (m. 1806; died 1815)
- Relations: Edward Harris, 4th Earl of Malmesbury (grandson)
- Children: James Harris, 3rd Earl of Malmesbury; Edward Alfred John Harris; Charles Amyand Harris
- Parent(s): James Harris, 1st Earl of Malmesbury; Harriet Maria Amyand

James Edward Harris, 2nd Earl of Malmesbury (19 August 1778 – 10 September 1841) was a British peer, styled Viscount FitzHarris from 1800 to 1820.

== Early life ==
He was the son of a great British statesman, James Harris, 1st Earl of Malmesbury, and the former Harriet Maria Amyand (1761–1830). Among his siblings were the Rev. Hon. Thomas Alfred Harris, Rector of Hartley, Lady Catherine Harris (wife of Gen. Sir John Bell), and Lady Frances Harris (wife of Lt.-Gen. Hon. Sir Galbraith Lowry Cole, second son of William Cole, 1st Earl of Enniskillen).

His paternal grandparents were James Harris of Great Durnford (a grandson of Anthony Ashley-Cooper, 2nd Earl of Shaftesbury) and the former Elizabeth Clarke (daughter and, eventual, heiress of John Clarke, of Sandford). His mother was the second daughter of Sir George Amyand, 1st Baronet and Anna Maria Korteen (a daughter of John Abraham Korteen, of Hamburg, Germany).

== Career ==
Unlike his father, the young James Harris only dabbled in politics. His real interests lay in being a sportsman, and he was known for his meticulous records of what game he had killed and of the local and national British weather. He built up an extensive collection of stuffed game, which was donated to various museums.

A précis writer, Malmesbury served in the Home Office as private secretary to the Secretary of State for Home Affairs from July 1801 to July 1802 under Lord Pelham. He was first returned as a Member of Parliament for Helston in 1802, serving until 1804. He was a Lords Commissioner of the Treasury from May 1804 to February 1806 during the Second Pitt ministry while he represented Horsham as MP. He then was returned for Heytesbury from 1807 to 1812 and Wilton from 1816 to 1820.

In 1804 he was commissioned as Lieutenant-Colonel of the short-lived 2nd Wiltshire Militia.

From March 1807 to August 1807, he served as Under-Secretary of State for Foreign Affairs under George Canning (while The Duke of Portland was Prime Minister), before becoming Governor of the Isle of Wight, in which role he until his death.

== Personal life ==
On 17 June 1806, he married Harriet Susan Dashwood (1783–1815), a daughter of Theresa Elizabeth March (daughter and co-heiress of John March of Waresley Park) and Francis Bateman Dashwood, of Well Vale, Lincolnshire. Her brother, Francis John Bateman Dashwood, married Georgiana Anne Anderson-Pelham (daughter of Charles Anderson-Pelham, 1st Baron Yarborough). Together, they were the parents of three sons:

- James Howard Harris, 3rd Earl of Malmesbury (1807–1889), who married Lady Corisande Emma Bennet, only daughter of Charles Bennet, 5th Earl of Tankerville in 1830. After her death in 1876, he married Susan Hamilton second daughter of John Hamilton, of Fyne Court, in 1880. After his death, she married Maj.-Gen. Sir John Charles Ardagh.
- Hon. Edward Alfred John Harris (1808–1888), an Admiral in the Royal Navy who was MP for Christchurch, Chargé d'Affaires and Consul-General in Denmark, Chargé d'Affaires in Chile, Minister at Berne, Minister at The Hague; he married Emma Wylly Chambers, youngest daughter of Capt. Samuel Chambers, in 1841.
- Hon. Charles Amyand Harris (1813–1874), the Bishop of Gibraltar and Archdeacon of Wiltshire; he married the Hon. Katharine Lucia O'Brien, a sister of Lucius O'Brien, 13th Baron Inchiquin, and youngest daughter of Sir Edward O'Brien, 4th Baronet, in 1837.

His wife died in 1815 and was buried at Salisbury and later at the Priory Church, Christchurch, Hampshire. Lord Malmesbury died on 10 September 1841.

Parliament of the United Kingdom
Preceded by Charles Abbot; Lord Francis Osborne	Member of Parliament for Helston; 1802–1804; With: John Penn	Succeeded by John Penn; Davies Giddy
Preceded by Edward Hilliard; Patrick Ross	Member of Parliament for Horsham; 1804–1806; With: Edward Hilliard	Succeeded by Francis John Wilder; Love Jones-Parry
Preceded by Charles Moore; Michael Symes	Member of Parliament for Heytesbury; 1807–1812; With: Charles Moore	Succeeded by Samuel Hood; Charles Duncombe
Preceded by Ralph Sheldon; Captain Hon. Charles Herbert	Member of Parliament for Wilton; 1816–1820; With: Ralph Sheldon	Succeeded by Ralph Sheldon; John Penruddocke
Political offices
Preceded by George Walpole; Sir Francis Vincent	Under-Secretary of State for Foreign Affairs; 1807	Succeeded by Charles Bagot
Honorary titles
Preceded by The Lord Bolton	Vice-Admiral of Hampshire; 1807–1831	Succeeded by The Lord Yarborough
Preceded by The Lord Bolton	Governor of the Isle of Wight; 1807–1841	Succeeded by The Lord Heytesbury
Peerage of Great Britain
Preceded by James Harris	Earl of Malmesbury; 1820–1841	Succeeded by James Harris
