= Edward Harris, 4th Earl of Malmesbury =

British noble (1842–1899)

Edward James Harris, 4th Earl of Malmesbury DL (12 April 1842 – 19 May 1899), was a British peer, the son of Admiral the Honourable Sir Edward Harris and the grandson of James Harris, 2nd Earl of Malmesbury. His maternal grandparents were Captain Samuel Chambers and Susan Mathilda Wylly; he was descended from David Mathews, the Loyalist Mayor of New York City during the American Revolutionary War and the Schuyler family.

Lord Malmesbury married Sylvia Georgina Stewart on 16 November 1870. They had three children:

- James Edward Harris, 5th Earl of Malmesbury (1872–1950).
- Hon. Alexander Charles Harris (1872–1927), died unmarried.
- Colonel Hon. Alfred Frederick William Harris (1877–1943), died unmarried.

Peerage of Great Britain
Preceded by James Howard Harris	Earl of Malmesbury; 1889–1899	Succeeded by James Edward Harris
