= River Crane, Dorset =

River in Dorset, England

Coordinates: 50°51′42″N 1°51′14″W

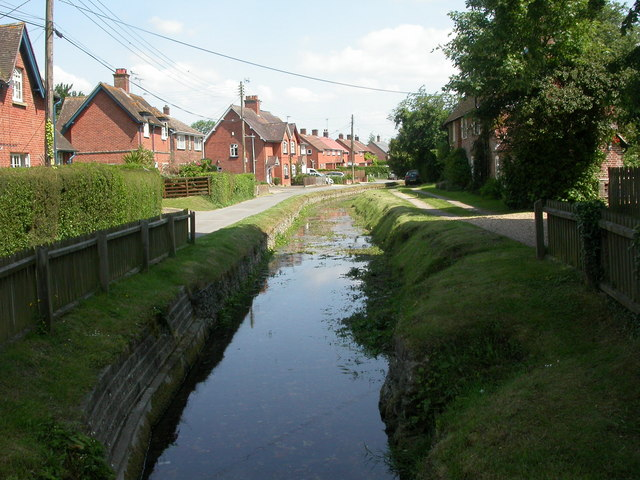
The River Crane in Cranborne.

The River Crane is a river in Dorset, United Kingdom, a chalk stream which flows past Cranborne Manor. Near Verwood it becomes the Moors River.

Its name is a shortening of Cranborne, meaning "a stream frequented by cranes [or herons]".
