= Charles Penruddocke =

English landowner and politician

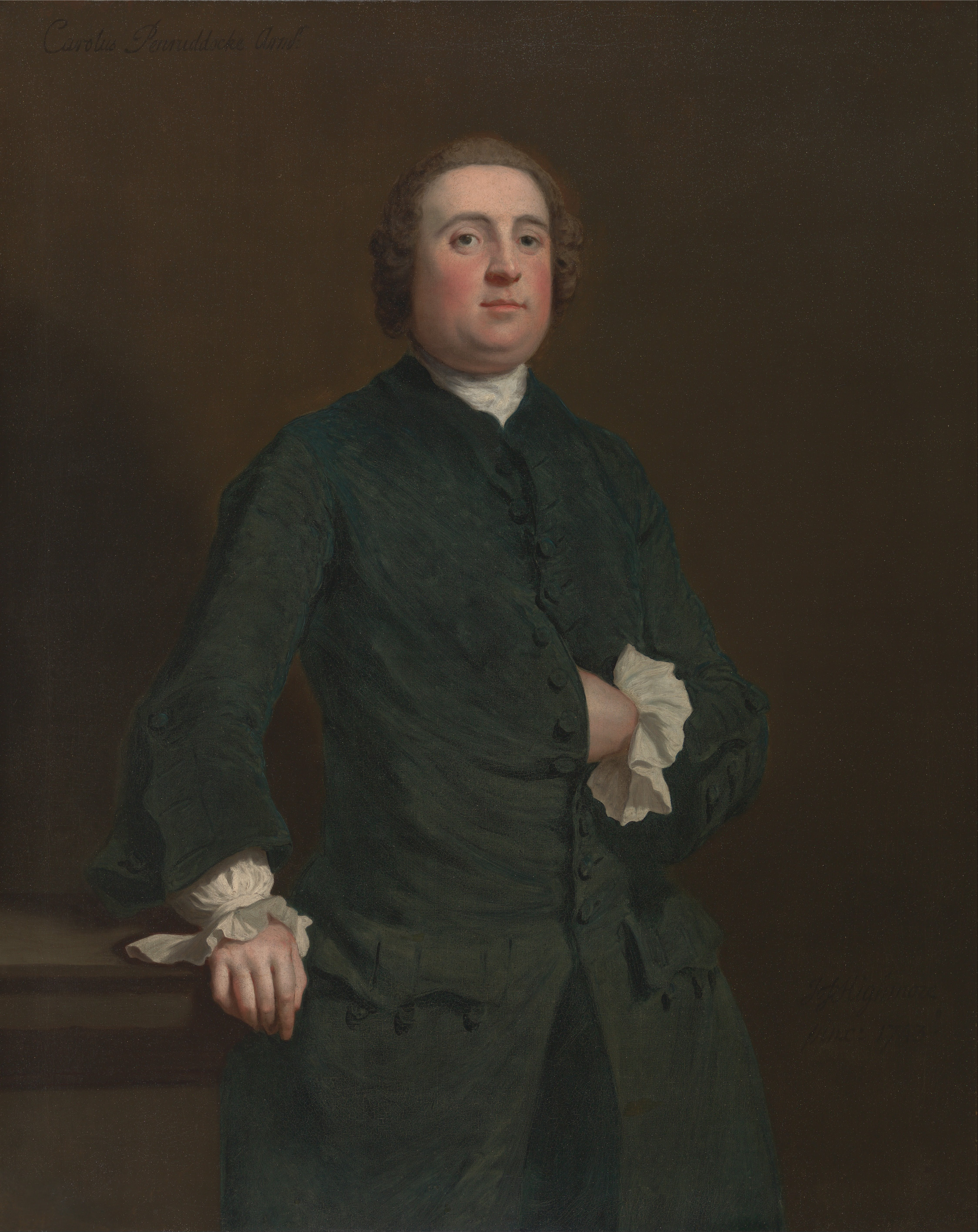
Penruddocke's father Charles in 1743, by Joseph Highmore

Charles Penruddocke (1743–1788) was an English landowner of Compton Chamberlayne, Wiltshire and a politician who sat in the House of Commons from 1770 to 1788.

Penruddocke was the only son of Charles Penruddocke of Compton Chamberlayne and his wife Frances Wyndham, daughter of William Wyndham of Dinton, Wiltshire. He matriculated at Trinity College, Oxford in 1761. He married his cousin Anne Henrietta Wyndham, daughter of Wadham Wyndham of Fyfield, Wiltshire on 10 April 1769. Also in 1769 Penruddocke's father died, and he inherited Compton House at Compton Chamberlayne.

Penruddocke was returned unopposed as Member of Parliament for Wiltshire at a by-election in 1770. He was returned again in 1774, 1780 and 1784. He generally voted with the opposition in parliament and is only recorded as speaking once.

Penruddocke died on 30 October 1788. He and his wife had five sons and four daughters.

Parliament of Great Britain
| Preceded by Thomas Goddard; Edward Popham | Member of Parliament for Wiltshire; 1770–1788; With: Edward Popham 1770-1772; Ambrose Goddard 1772-1788 | Succeeded by Sir James Tylney-Long; Ambrose Goddard |
