= John Penruddock =

English Cavalier

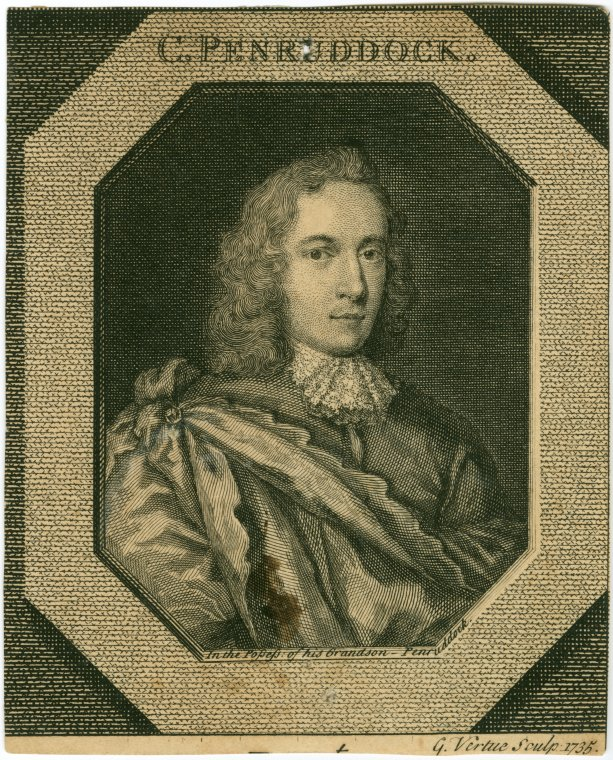
Colonel John Penruddock

Colonel Sir John Penruddock (or Penruddocke; 1619–1655), of Compton Chamberlayne, was an English Cavalier during the English Civil War and the English Interregnum. He is remembered as the leader of the Penruddock uprising in 1655.

The Sealed Knot had planned an insurrection for March 1655. There were plans to seize Salisbury, Newcastle, York and Winchester and to instigate smaller uprisings in Nottinghamshire and Cheshire. As the New Model Army garrison in Winchester was reinforced shortly before the uprising, plans to attack it were abandoned. No men answered the call in Cheshire, but elsewhere risings did take place. Due to a lack of support, however, the Royalists disbanded without a fight at all the locations except the group from Salisbury.

Penruddock, along with Sir Joseph Wagstaffe and Hugh Grove, organised and led the Royalist uprising in the West. On 11 March, Penruddock, with between three hundred and four hundred other Cavaliers, took Salisbury and raised the Royal Standard. The next morning, leading his followers out of Salisbury, Penruddock headed westwards through Blandford, Sherborne and Yeovil, hoping to pick up more supporters. By 14 March, his exhausted group had reached South Molton in Devon, where, after a three-hour street fight, it was defeated by a single New Model Army troop of horse under Captain Unton Crook. Crook captured Penruddock and the other ringleaders, while most of the other Royalists either fled or were killed.

For his part in the rebellion, Penruddock, along with Hugh Grove and Francis Jones, was beheaded at Exeter in May 1655. Some of the other Royalists who took part were also executed, while seventy were shipped to the West Indies and sold into slavery. Wagstaffe escaped.

Penruddock was married to Arundel Freke, the daughter of John Freke, Esq., of Shrewton, Wiltshire. They had two sons, George and Thomas, and four daughters, Elizabeth, Joan, Mary, and Anne. Penruddock succeeded his father, Sir John Penruddocke of Compton Chamberlayne, in 1648. His elder son, George, died in 1664, and he was thus succeeded in his estates by his younger son, Thomas Penruddocke (c. 1648–1695), later member of parliament for Wilton.
