= Thomas Penruddocke =

Thomas Penruddocke DL (about 1648 – 1698), of Compton Chamberlayne was a Wiltshire landowner and politician, briefly member of parliament for Wilton in 1679 (the 'Habeas Corpus Parliament') and again in 1689 (the famous Convention Parliament).

== Life ==
Penruddocke was the younger son of Colonel John Penruddocke (1619–1655), one of the leaders of the Penruddock uprising of 1655, by his father's marriage to Arundel Freke, the daughter of John Freke, Esq., of Shrewton, Wiltshire. He had an elder brother, George, who died in 1664, and four sisters, and thus succeeded to his father's estates while still a minor.

Penruddocke is mentioned in the will of his grandfather Sir John Penruddocke, and also in that of his unmarried sister, Jane Penruddocke, dated 30 August 1670.

On 26 July 1666, Penruddocke matriculated at Magdalen College, Oxford, when his age was given as seventeen.

In 1672, by a licence dated 9 July 1672, Penruddocke married Frances Hanham, daughter of John Hanham, Esq., of Iwerne Courtney, Dorset, and they had at least nine children, John, Edward, Jane, Thomas, George, Charles, Arundel, Lucy, and Frances.

In 1680, Thomas Thynne of Longleat gave Penruddocke a licence for hawking, hunting, fishing and fowling in Dinton, Wiltshire.

In 1683, Thomas Herbert, 8th Earl of Pembroke, Lord Lieutenant of Wiltshire, commissioned Penruddocke as one of his Deputy Lieutenants. The two had served together as members of parliament for Wilton in 1679, the 'Habeas Corpus Parliament'.

Penruddocke served as Colonel of the Wiltshire Militia Horse.

Penruddocke went to Parliament again in 1689, as one of the members for Wilton of the famous Convention Parliament. This was the parliament which passed the Bill of Rights following the Glorious Revolution, inviting William III and Mary II to take the throne of King James II.
