= George Penruddock =

16th-century English politician

Sir George Penruddock (by 1527 – 8 July 1581) was an English politician.

He was a younger son of Edward Penruddock of Arkleby, Cumberland and entered the service of William Herbert, 1st Earl of Pembroke.

He was a Member (MP) of the Parliament of England for Salisbury in March 1553, Wiltshire in 1558 and 1572, and Downton in 1571.

He was appointed High Sheriff of Wiltshire for 1562–63 and High Sheriff of Hertfordshire for 1567–68. By 1565 he was an Esquire of the Body. He was knighted at Hatfield in 1568 by Robert, Earl of Leicester.

He married twice: first Elizabeth, the daughter and heiress of William Apryce of Faulstone, Wiltshire, with whom he had 2 sons, and secondly Anne, the daughter of Thomas Goodere of Monken Hadley, Hertfordshire and widow of John Cock of London and Broxbourne.
