= John Penruddock (MP) =

English politician

John Penruddock (bef. 1542 – 8 March 1601) was an English politician.

He was a member (MP) of the parliament of England for Wilton in 1584 and Southampton in 1586.
