= Fosdick =

Fosdick can stand for:

== Places ==
- Fosdick-Masten Park High School, an historic public high school building in Buffalo, New York
- Fosdick Mountains, a mountain range in Antarctica

== People ==
- Harry Castlemon (1842–1915), nom de plume of American author Charles Austin Fosdick
- Dorothy Fosdick (1913–1997), American foreign policy expert
- Harry Emerson Fosdick (1878–1969), American clergyman
- Nicoll Fosdick (1785–1868), American merchant and politician
- W. W. Fosdick (1825–1862), American lawyer, poet, writer and song lyricist

== Other uses ==
- Fearless Fosdick, a comic strip hero from Al Capp's Li'l Abner
