= Joseph Edward Willard =

American politician (1865–1924)

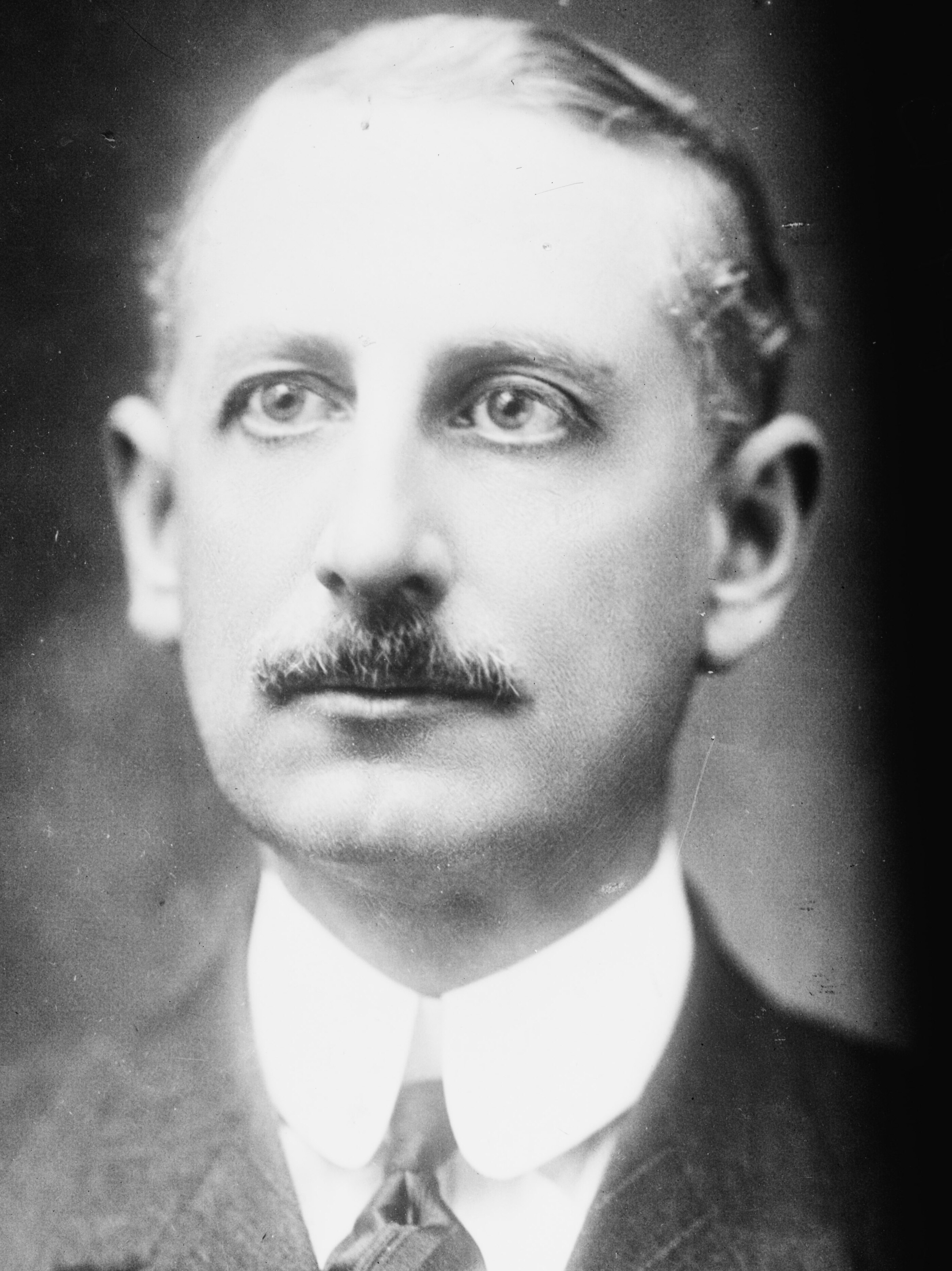

36th United States Ambassador to Spain
- In office October 31, 1913 – July 7, 1921
- President: Woodrow Wilson
- Preceded by: Henry Clay Ide
- Succeeded by: Cyrus Woods

Member of the Virginia State Corporation Commission
- In office October 1, 1905 – February 18, 1910
- Preceded by: Henry Fairfax
- Succeeded by: J. Richard Wingfield

19th Lieutenant Governor of Virginia
- In office January 1, 1902 – February 1, 1906
- Governor: Andrew J. Montague
- Preceded by: Edward Echols
- Succeeded by: James Taylor Ellyson

Member of the Virginia House of Delegates from Fairfax County
- In office December 6, 1893 – December 4, 1901
- Preceded by: R. C. Triplett
- Succeeded by: R. E. Lee, Jr.

Personal details
- Born: Joseph Edward Willard; May 1, 1865 Washington, D.C., U.S.
- Died: April 4, 1924 (aged 58) Manhattan, New York, U.S.
- Resting place: Oak Hill Cemetery; Washington, D.C., U.S.
- Spouse: Belle Layton Wyatt
- Relations: Antonia Ford (mother); Kermit Roosevelt (son-in-law) Mervyn Herbert (son-in-law)
- Children: 2
- Education: Virginia Military Institute

Joseph Edward Willard (May 1, 1865 – April 4, 1924) was an American politician, philanthropist, and diplomat.

== Early life ==
The son of prominent Washington hotelier and Union Army commissary major Joseph Clapp Willard (1820–1897) and former Confederate spy Antonia Ford, Joseph Willard had two brothers who died in infancy. He was educated at Episcopal High School in Alexandria, Virginia.

== Career ==
Willard served for eight years in the Virginia House of Delegates, prior to his election as the 19th Lieutenant Governor of Virginia. He held that office from 1902 through 1906, leaving after an unsuccessful run for governor. The Virginia General Assembly then elected him a commissioner of the relatively new Virginia State Corporation Commission, where he served for four years.

In 1913, President Woodrow Wilson appointed Willard as the United States Ambassador to Spain. Upon the outbreak of World War I Willard was vacationing in the United States and returned to Europe aboard the USS Tennessee, although his daughter, Belle, was sick with typhoid fever (she would recover). Ambassador Willard held his position under successive presidents of both political parties until shortly before his death.

== Personal life ==
Willard and his wife, Belle Layton Wyatt (1869–1954), had two daughters, Belle Wyatt, (1892–1968) who later married Kermit Roosevelt on June 10, 1914, and Mary Elizabeth, (1898-1979) who later married The Hon. Mervyn Herbert, third son of 4th Earl of Carnarvon, in 1921.

His daughter, Belle, and Roosevelt had four children:

1. Kermit Roosevelt Jr. (1916-2000); married Mary Lowe Gaddis (1917-2013) and had four children.
2. Joseph Willard Roosevelt (1918-2008); married (1) Nancy Thayer/Cummings, daughter of poet E.E. Cummings and had two children; married (2) Carole Adele Russell and had three children.
3. Belle Wyatt Roosevelt (1919-1985); married John Gorham Palfrey Jr., grandson of John G. Palfrey, 2nd great-grandson of William Palfrey, and grand-nephew of Francis Winthrop Palfrey; had three children.
4. Dirck Roosevelt (1925-1953)

Willard had at least 12 grandchildren, including Mark Roosevelt; his great-grandchildren include Kermit Roosevelt III, John Palfrey and Quentin Palfrey.

=== Death ===
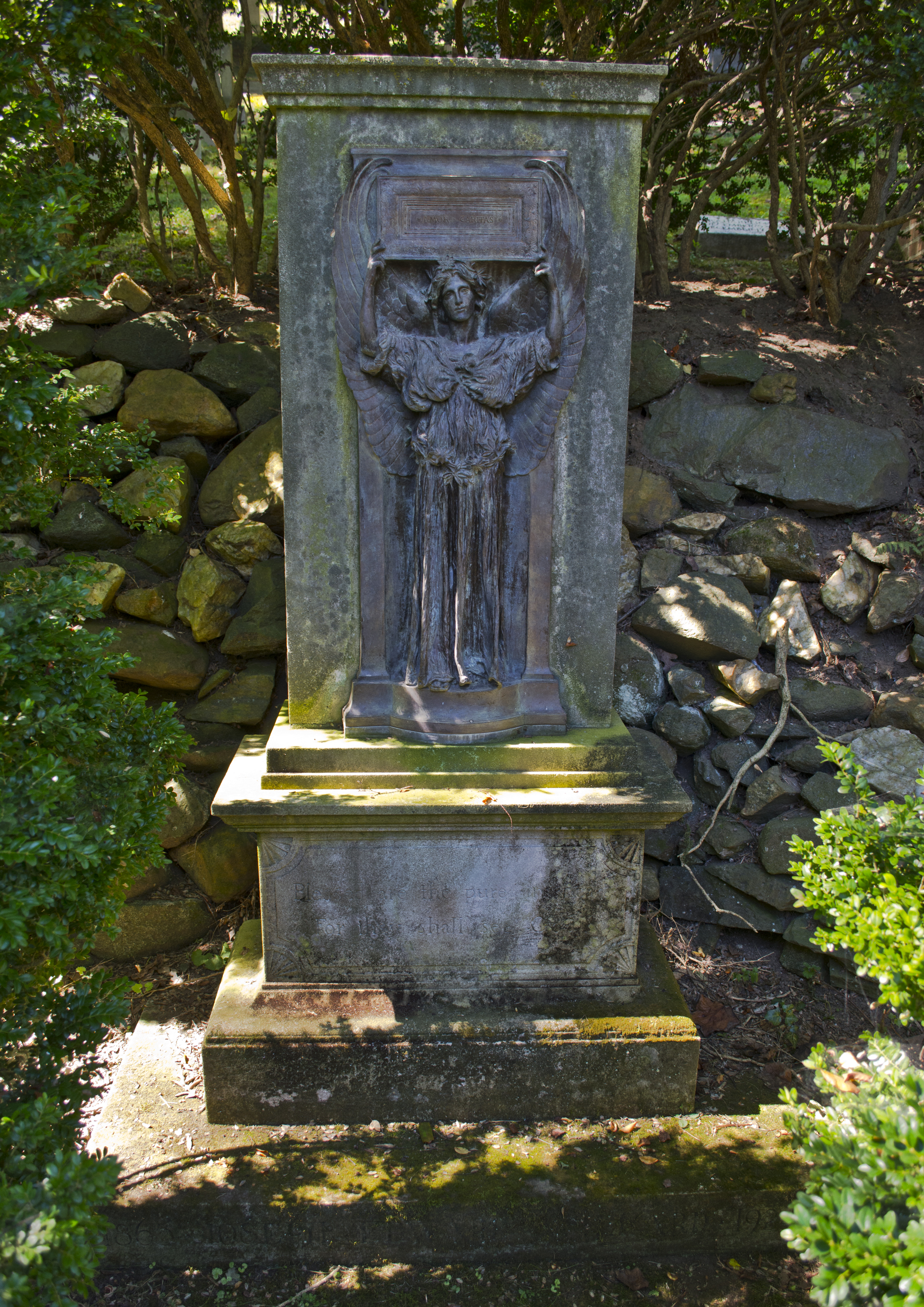
Tomb at Oak Hill cemetery

Willard died in Manhattan, New York, on April 4, 1924. His remains were returned to Washington, D.C., for burial at Oak Hill cemetery.

== Sources ==
- Willard Family Papers, Library of Congress

Political offices
| Preceded by Edward Echols | Lieutenant Governor of Virginia; 1902–1906 | Succeeded by James Taylor Ellyson |
Diplomatic posts
| Preceded by Henry Clay Ide | United States Ambassador to Spain; 1913–1921 | Succeeded by Cyrus E. Woods |
