= Mervyn Herbert =

English cricketer and diplomat

Personal information
- Full name: Mervyn Robert Howard Molyneux Herbert
- Born: 27 December 1882; Highclere Castle, Hampshire, England
- Died: 26 May 1929 (aged 46); Rome, Italy
- Batting: Right-handed
- Role: Batsman
- Relatives: Henry Howard (grandfather)

Domestic team information
- Years: Team
- 1901–1902: Nottinghamshire
- 1902–1904: Oxford University
- 1903–1924: Somerset
- First-class debut: 1 May 1901 Nottinghamshire v Marylebone Cricket Club (MCC)
- Last First-class: 30 May 1924 Somerset v Cambridge University

Career statistics
Competition	First-class
Matches	42
Runs scored	854
Batting average	12.02
100s/50s	–/3
Top score	78
Balls bowled	18
Wickets	–
Bowling average	–
5 wickets in innings	–
10 wickets in match	–
Best bowling	0/28
Catches/stumpings	18/–
- Source: CricketArchive, 19 June 2010

The Honourable Mervyn Robert Howard Molyneux Herbert (27 December 1882 – 26 May 1929) of Tetton, Kingston St Mary in Somerset, was a career diplomat and a first-class cricket player.

== Origins ==
Herbert was born at Highclere Castle in Hampshire, the third son of Henry Herbert, 4th Earl of Carnarvon, a wealthy landowner, British cabinet minister, and Lord Lieutenant of Ireland. His mother (his father's second wife and cousin) was Elizabeth Catherine Howard (1856-1929) ("Elsie"), a daughter of Henry Howard of Greystoke Castle, near Penrith, Cumberland, a son of Lord Henry Howard-Molyneux-Howard, younger brother of Bernard Howard, 12th Duke of Norfolk. Elizabeth Howard's brother was Esmé Howard, 1st Baron Howard of Penrith.

Herbert was a younger full brother of the writer and politician Aubrey Herbert and was a younger half-brother of George Herbert, 5th Earl of Carnarvon, the noted Egyptologist who, together with Howard Carter, discovered Tutankhamen's tomb. Mervyn travelled to Egypt for the official opening of Tutankhamen's tomb in November 1922.

== Personal life ==
He was educated at Eton College and at Balliol College, Oxford.

In 1921 he married Mary Elizabeth Willard, a daughter of Joseph E. Willard, the US ambassador to Spain, and younger sister of Belle Willard, the wife of Kermit Roosevelt, son of the former US president Theodore. He had three children.

== Cricket career ==
Herbert was a right-handed middle-order batsman. He played for Eton in the 1901 Eton v Harrow cricket match at Lord's, and in a house match at Eton that season he and George Lyttelton put on 476 for the second wicket, both scoring double centuries. In the same year, he made the first of six appearances in first-class cricket for Nottinghamshire, starting off with an innings of 65 in a match against the Marylebone Cricket Club (MCC) at Lord's.

Though Herbert played occasional matches for Oxford University he was not selected as a blue, and from 1903 most of his first-class cricket was for Somerset. Only in 1909 was he able to play at all regularly and in that season he made his highest first-class score, 78, in the match against Middlesex at Lord's. He also played an innings of 55 in 1909, batting at No 9 and sharing an eighth wicket partnership of 125 with Talbot Lewis that enabled Somerset to save the match against Kent, the 1909 County Champions, after following on. He did not play at all after 1912 until he reappeared in one match in each of the 1922, 1923 and 1924 seasons.

== Diplomatic career ==
Herbert was appointed as an attache in the Foreign Office in 1907. He became a third secretary in the Diplomatic Service in 1910. In 1916 he was further promoted to become a second secretary. And then in 1919 he became a first secretary. He served in embassies and delegations in Rome, Lisbon, Madrid and Cairo, and was first secretary in Madrid up to 1922, returning to a Whitehall job in the Foreign Office between 1924 and 1926.

== Death ==
He was reported in the New York Times as having died at the British Embassy in Rome of "malarial pneumonia". The Times of London reported that he was passing through Rome on his way home from Albania, where his family had extensive interests, and caught malaria that turned to pneumonia.
