= Antonia Ford =

Confederate spy (1838–1871)

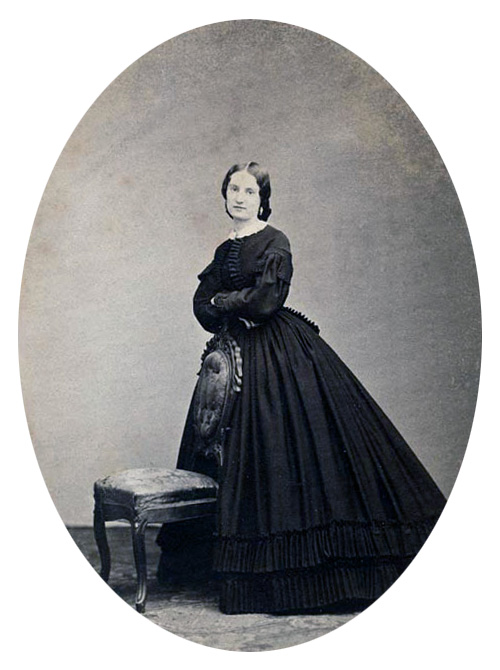
- Studio portrait of Antonia Ford Willard
- Born: 23 July 1838; Fairfax Court House, Virginia, U.S.
- Died: 14 February 1871 (aged 32); Washington, D.C., U.S.
- Resting place: Oak Hill Cemetery; Washington, D.C., U.S.
- Occupation: Confederate Spy
- Spouse: Major Joseph Clapp Willard

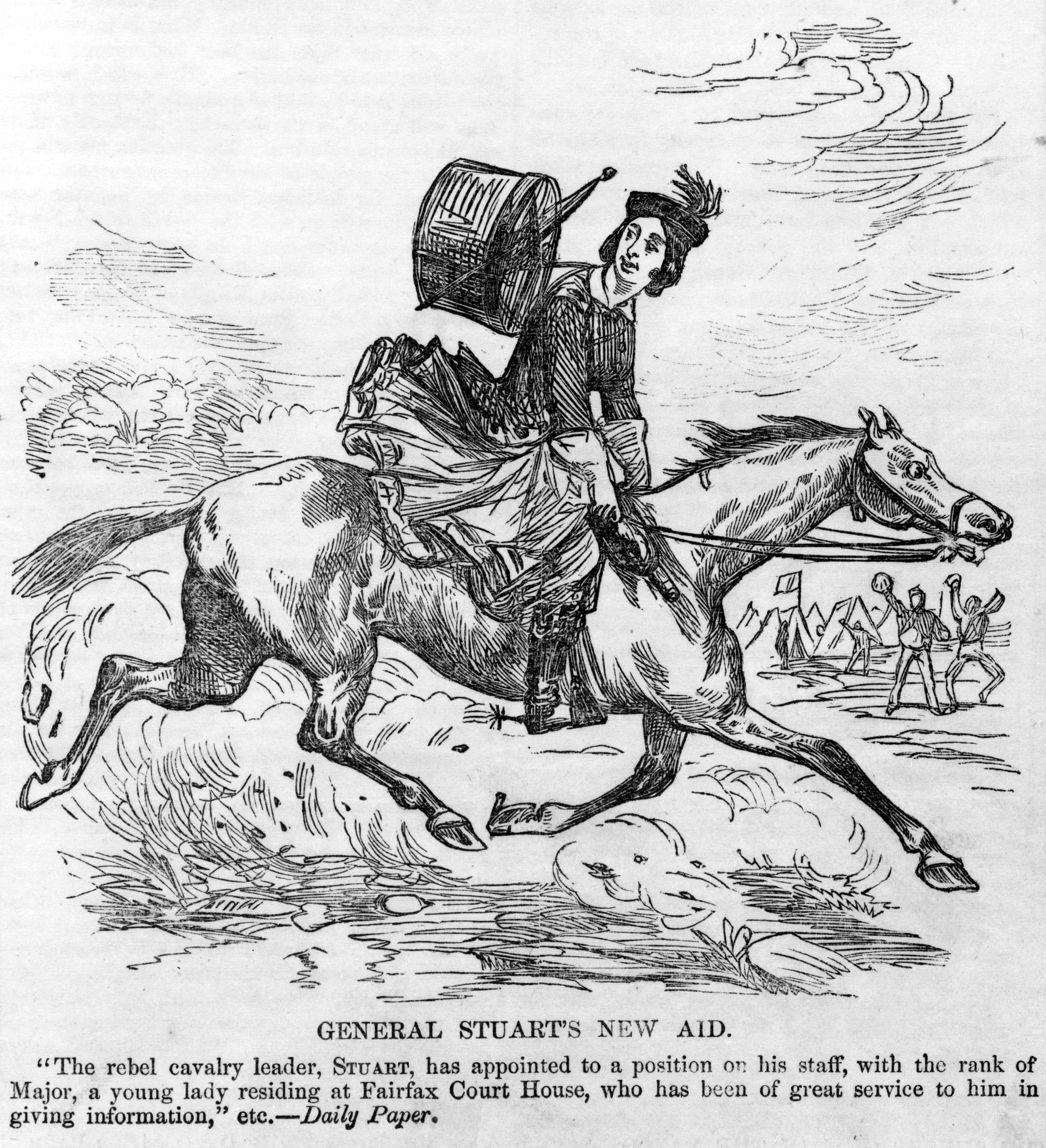
On April 4, 1863, Harper's Weekly ran this "Cartoon of the Day" depicting Antonia Ford. The caption reads: "The rebel cavalry leader Stuart, has appointed to a position on his staff, with the rank of Major, a young lady residing at Fairfax Court House, who has been of great service to him in giving information."

Antonia Ford Willard (July 23, 1838 – February 14, 1871) was a volunteer civilian spy for the Confederate States Army during the American Civil War.

== Early life ==
Antonia Ford was born at Fairfax Court House, Virginia. She was a daughter of a prominent local merchant and ardent secessionist named Edward R. Ford. Before going to the Buckingham Female Collegiate Institute in Buckingham, Virginia, she attended nearby Coombe Cottage, a private finishing school for girls.

== American Civil War ==
As Union forces occupied the Fairfax region in mid-1861, Ford circulated among the officers and garnered valuable intelligence about troop strengths and planned movements, which she passed along to Brigadier General J.E.B. Stuart, in whose artillery her brother, Charles, served. Ford also spied for John S. Mosby, a noted partisan ranger. Stuart, grateful for her service and appreciative of the information he had received, designated Ford as an honorary aide-de-camp on October 7, 1861.

In early 1863, Ford was betrayed by a Union counterspy named Frankie Abel, whom she had befriended and shown the document bearing Stuart's signature. Ford was subsequently arrested on March 13 and incarcerated in Washington, D.C., at the Old Capitol Prison. She was accused of playing a prominent role in the capture of Union general Edwin H. Stoughton, but Colonel Mosby and others later denied her complicity, and no evidence of her guilt could be found. She was released and exchanged seven days later. However, she was arrested in Fairfax by Major Joseph Clapp Willard (1820–1897) and sent back to Old Capitol Prison. She took the Oath of Allegiance, he resigned his position in the Union Army, and they subsequently married on March 10, 1864, in Washington, D.C. The couple had three children, only one surviving infancy.

Antonia Ford Willard died in Washington, D.C. in 1871 as an indirect result of health issues stemming from her captivity. Her husband never remarried. Their son Joseph Edward Willard later became Lieutenant Governor of Virginia and the father-in-law of Kermit Roosevelt .

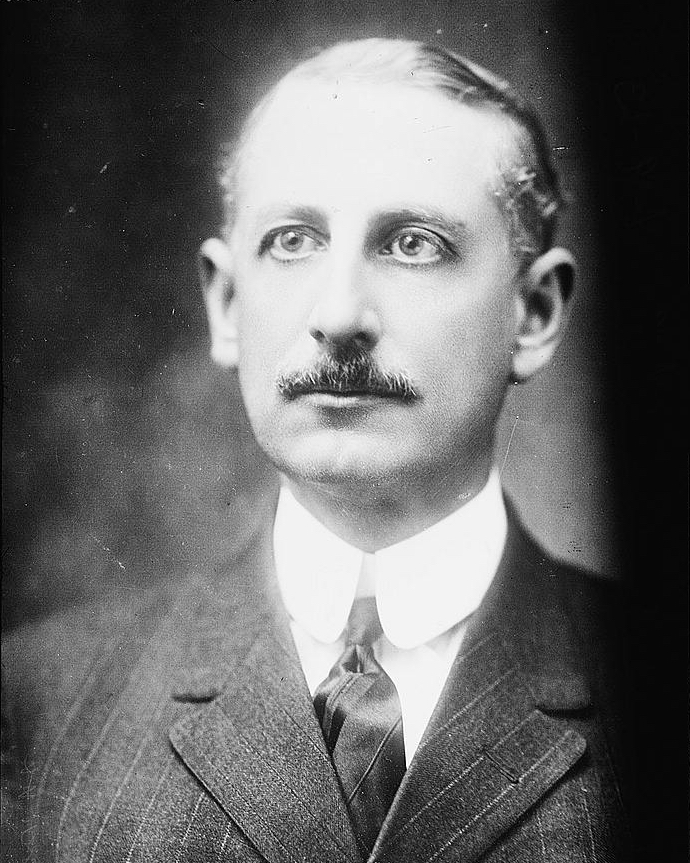
Joseph Edward Willard

Ford was buried at Oak Hill Cemetery in Washington, D.C.

== Film ==
The 2007 made-for-television docudrama, Now & Forever Yours: Letters to an Old Soldier, artistically recounts the courtship of Antonia Ford and Major Joseph Clapp Willard. It was written and directed by Steven Fischer. In the film, Ford and Willard recount from an ethereal netherworld the events of their two-year affair. This narrative is dramatically illustrated with scenes of the courtship filmed in and around Fairfax, Virginia, where the actual romance took place. Now & Forever Yours: Letters to an Old Soldier was a critical success, winning, among others, an Emmy Award nomination for cinematography. The dialogue between the lovers was taken directly from the couple's surviving letters. The movie starred Katie Tschida and Winston Shearin.

In 2009, BLM Productions released a feature-length docudrama, Spies in Crinoline, which recounts the intersecting lives of spies Antonia Ford and Laura Ratcliffe. The screenplay, adapted from Karla Vernon's The Spy in Crinoline and numerous primary sources, intersperses dramatic sequences shot on-location in Fairfax County, Virginia, with period images, narration, and interviews with historians. Directed by Bert Morgan, it stars Emily Lapisardi as Antonia Ford, Gregory Labenz as Joseph Willard, Becci Varga as Laura Ratcliffe, and Joe Cain as General J.E.B. Stuart.
