= USS Delta (AR-9) =

Cargo ship of the United States Navy

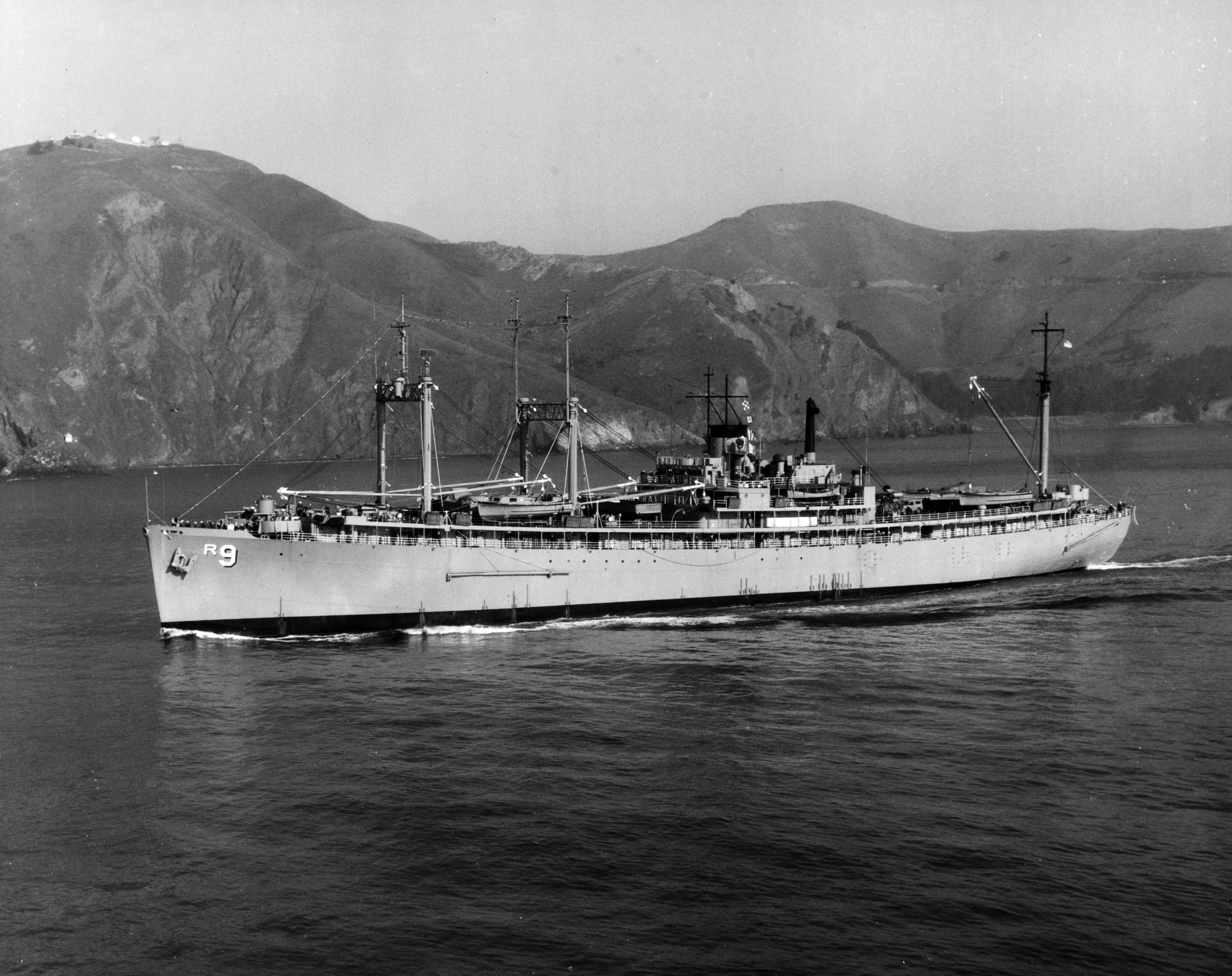
- USS Delta in the 1960s

History

United States
- Name: USS Delta
- Builder: Newport News Shipbuilding
- Launched: 2 April 1941
- Acquired: 4 June 1941
- Commissioned: 16 June 1941
- Decommissioned: 5 March 1947
- Recommissioned: 1 November 1950
- Decommissioned: 1 December 1955
- Recommissioned: 31 October 1959
- Decommissioned: 20 June 1970
- Stricken: 1 October 1970
- Fate: Sold for scrapping 1983

General characteristics
- Displacement: 8,975 long tons light
- Length: 490 ft 6 in (149.50 m)
- Beam: 69 ft 6 in (21.18 m)
- Draught: 23 ft 6 in (7.16 m)
- Speed: 18 knots (33 km/h; 21 mph)
- Armament: 1 × 5 in (130 mm) gun; 4 × 3 in (76 mm) guns

USS Delta (AK-29/AR-9) was the lead ship of her class of repair ships in the United States Navy during World War II. She was originally built as the merchant ship SS Hawaiian Packer before her requisition by the U.S. Navy in 1941. Before conversion to a repair ships, Delta briefly served as a U.S. Navy cargo ship.

== Career ==
=== World War II ===
Delta was built in 1941 as the Hawaiian Packer by Newport News Shipbuilding, Newport News, Virginia, one of four Type C3 ships ordered by the Matson Navigation Company. Launched on 2 April, she was acquired by the Navy on 4 June 1941; and commissioned as USS Delta (AK-29) on 16 June 1941.

From 8 July 1941 to May 1942 Delta carried cargo from east coast ports to Guantanamo Bay, Cuba; Puerto Rico; Bermuda; Argentina; Newfoundland, Halifax, and Nova Scotia, Canada; and Reykjavík, Iceland. On 1 July 1942, Delta was reclassified as AR-9, and was placed in reserve commission for conversion to a fleet repair ship by Cramp Shipyard, Philadelphia.

Delta sailed from Philadelphia on 3 March 1943, and between March and June repaired amphibious ships and craft at Oran, Algeria. She served similarly at Bizerte, Tunisia, from June to March 1944, then at Palermo, Italy, and on 8 July sailed for Pozzuouli, Italy, to prepare landing craft for their return to the United States. Her final Mediterranean duty, from November to April 1945, was to tend destroyers at Oran.

She returned to Norfolk Naval Shipyard for overhaul on 27 April 1945, and on 15 June sailed for Pearl Harbor for a month of repair duty. On 26 August, she arrived at Yokosuka Naval Base for general fleet repair work, including the assignment of preparing Nagato, the former Japanese battleship, for the atomic weapons tests of 1946 at Bikini. Delta served the Fleet at Shanghai from March through June 1946, and on 17 July arrived at Philadelphia, where she was decommissioned and placed in reserve on 5 March 1947.

=== Korea ===
Recommissioned 1 November 1950, Delta arrived at San Diego on 8 March 1951 to provide repair services to ships of the Pacific Fleet there and at Long Beach, California as well as on periodic deployments to the Far East. Her first such, during the Korean War, was from 25 June 1952 until 14 February 1953. On her second, in 1953 and 1954, she joined in Operation "Passage to Freedom", the evacuation of Vietnamese to South Vietnam upon the partition of Indochina. During her last Far Eastern service, in 1955, she served as flagship for the Blockading and Escort Force off Korea. She returned from this cruise to Tacoma, Washington, where she was decommissioned and placed in reserve 1 December 1955.

=== Vietnam ===
On 31 October 1959, Delta was recommissioned in a dual ceremony at Bremerton Naval Shipyard, as USS Kermit Roosevelt (ARG-16) was decommissioned and her crew simultaneously recommissioned Delta. She served for another eleven years until being decommissioned on 20 June 1970 at Bremerton Naval Shipyard. Delta was stricken from the Naval Register on 1 October 1977 and transferred to the Maritime Administration (MARAD) for lay up in the National Defense Reserve Fleet. MARAD finally sold Delta on 19 July 1983, probably for scrapping.

Delta served as a floating machine shop at Mare Island Naval Shipyard under MARAD in 1980 and was located there until detached from MARAD in 1983.

== Awards ==
Delta received two battle stars for World War II service, one battle star for Korean War service and one campaign star for Vietnam War service.
