= Joseph Willard Roosevelt =

American pianist and composer

- Born: January 16, 1918; Madrid, Spain
- Died: May 18, 2008 (aged 90); Orient, New York, United States
- Occupations: pianist and composer
- Spouse: Nancy Thayer Carol Adele Russell (1935–2022)
- Children: 5
- Parent(s): Kermit Roosevelt; Belle Wyatt Willar
- Family: See Roosevelt family

Joseph Willard Roosevelt (January 16, 1918 – May 18, 2008) was an American pianist and composer.

== Early life ==
Roosevelt was born on January 16, 1918, as the second son of Kermit Roosevelt and Belle Wyatt Willard. He was named for his grandfather, Joseph Edward Willard, the Lieutenant Governor of Virginia and United States Ambassador to Spain. Among his siblings were brother Kermit Roosevelt Jr.

His paternal grandparents were U.S. President Theodore "T.R." Roosevelt Jr. and First Lady Edith Kermit Carow. He was uncle to Mark Roosevelt and great-uncle to Kermit Roosevelt III, John Palfrey and Quentin Palfrey.

Like several of his family members, Roosevelt attended Groton School and Harvard University and studied piano with Nadia Boulanger in France.

== Career ==
He served in the Pacific during World War II. He was commissioned in the Naval Reserve on August 19, 1940, and was promoted to lieutenant on March 1, 1943. Later in the war, he served as captain of the USS Greene, (APD-36). With the Greene he supported the invasion of southern France in August 1944 and later served on escort duties in the Pacific.

He taught music at The Hartt School, Mannes College of Music, Fairleigh Dickinson University and the Longy School of Music. Roosevelt's compositions are published by the American Composers Alliance and Merion Music.

== Personal life ==
On December 22, 1943, while a lieutenant in the Navy, Roosevelt married first Nancy Thayer in New York City. At the time, she believed her father was the poet Scofield Thayer, however, she was actually a daughter of poet E.E. Cummings. Before their divorce in 1954, they were the parents of two children:

- Simon Willard Roosevelt (1945–1965), a student at Columbia University who died in a motorcycle accident at age 19; he married Ann Whitney Alexander in Pittsfield, Massachusetts in January 1964. After his death, she became the editor of BMD Monitor.
- Elizabeth Françoise Roosevelt (b. 1947), who married Derek C. Aldred in January 1966 in Hammersmith, England.

After his divorce, Roosevelt was married on May 28, 1955, in Mendon, Vermont to Carol Adele Russell (1935–2022), a daughter of Eleanor Lavinia Rassmussen and Joseph John Russell. They had three children:

- Dirck Roosevelt (b. 1955), a professor at Teachers College, Columbia University; he married Nancy Glowa.
- Caleb Willard Roosevelt (1963–1982), a student at Bard College at Simon's Rock who died in a car accident in New Marlborough, Massachusetts.
- David Russell Roosevelt (1965–1986), who died after flipping his father's truck near Sandisfield, Massachusetts.

Roosevelt died at his home in Orient, New York the age of 90 on May 18, 2008.

=== Descendants ===
Through his eldest son Simon, he was a grandfather of Simon Cummings Roosevelt (b. 1964), an attorney at Cadwalader, Wickersham & Taft who married Lolita Ximena Echavarria (daughter of Hernán Echavarría Olózaga, Colombia's Ambassador to the United States in 1967 and 1968), in 1999.

== Selected works ==
Opera

- And the Walls Came Tumbling Down (1976); 1 act with libretto by Loften Mitchell

Orchestra / band

- Amistad for orchestra (1960)
- Band Piece No. 1 (1979)
- Band Piece No. 2 (1979)
- Concerto for cello and orchestra (1963)
- Concerto for piano and orchestra
- Suite for oboe, bassoon and string orchestra (1959)

Chamber / instrumental

- Flute and Fiddle, 4 Duos for 5 flutes (bass, alto, standard, shakuhachi, piccolo) and 2 fiddles (violin, viola) (1975)
- The Judgement of Paris for flute (also alto flute) and optional mime (1975)
- Lament for Willie Thomas Jones for 4 cellos (1975)
- The Leaden and the Golden Echo for reciter and piano (1957); text by Gerard Manley Hopkins
- Paul Revere's Ride for flute solo and optional mime (1975)
- Serenade for oboe, viola and cello (1955)
- Short Suite for oboe, clarinet and bassoon (1982)
- Sonata for cello and piano (1953)
- Sonata for violin and piano
- Song and Dance Suite for oboe, clarinet and viola (1975)
- String Quartet
- Suite for viola solo (1963)
- Trio for clarinet, cello and piano (1952)
- Waltz for flute (or clarinet) and piano (1978)

Piano

- Dance Suite (1982)
- Sonata No. 1 in D major
- Sonata No. 2 in B♭ major
- Suite (1963)

Vocal

- An American Sampler, 4 Songs for soprano, horn and piano (1976); words by Phyllis Wheatley, Edward Coote Pinkney, Philip Freneau, Charles F. Hoffman
- Aria (Oh, Joshua) for voice and piano (1970); words by Loften Mitchell
- Four Songs for soprano and clarinet (1975); words by Lloyd Frankenberg and E. E. Cummings
- Five Songs for soprano and viola (1975); words by Lloyd Frankenberg and E. E. Cummings
- Five Songs from Caleb for voice and piano (1990); words by Caleb Roosevelt
- May Song It Flourish for Soprano, mezzo-soprano, baritone and chamber orchestra (1960); words by James Joyce
- Three Songs for baritone and piano (1991); words by Gerard Manley Hopkins
- Three Songs from Poe for soprano, clarinet and piano (1977); words by Edgar Allan Poe
- Two Songs for voice and piano (1967); words by E. E. Cummings
- Two Songs for voice and piano (1973); words by Lloyd Frankenberg
- War Is Kind (Our Dead Brother Bid Us Think of Life) for soprano, narrator, dancer and chamber orchestra (1976); words by Stephen Crane and Oliver Wendell Holmes Jr.
