= Iranian Students Association in the United States =

American student group

- Abbreviation: ISAUS
- Nickname: Iranian Students Association in the U.S.
- Merged into: Confederation of Iranian Students National Union
- Formation: 1952
- Dissolved: circa early–1980s

The Iranian Students Association in the United States (ISAUS) was an American national student group for the Iranian diaspora, active from 1952 until the early 1980s. By the early 1960s, the group transformed into a significant portion of the membership of the Confederation of Iranian Students National Union (CISNU). The ISAUS was still active during the Iranian Revolution between 1977 and 1978, holding national protests and publishing information against Shah Mohammad Reza Pahlavi.

== History ==
The Iranian Students Association in the United States was founded in 1952. The group was created with support of the Iranian embassy in the United States and the American Friends of the Middle East (AFME), which was later financially linked to the Central Intelligence Agency (CIA) in an April 1967 article in Ramparts. By the late-1950s, the ISAUS had approximately 1200 members. Starting in 1953, the Berkeley-based ISAUS group hosted an annual conference at the International House at University of California, Berkeley.

In the early 1960s, many if the members of ISAUS joined the Confederation of Iranian Students National Union and these students were opposed to the Shah's regime. The Iranian students were upset and saw the Shah as a "symbol of 25 years of torture and murder" within the country, however most of the world was still supporting the Shah during this period. The group was responsible for the major demonstrations against the Shah in Los Angeles.

In 1976, the ISAUS published pamphlets with allegations of conspiracy between SAVAK (the Pahlavi Iran state–run security and intelligence agency) with the French government and U.S. government. The Iranian Students Association group was active during the Iranian Revolution between 1977 and 1978, holding national protests against Shah Mohammad Reza Pahlavi. The ISAUS published, alongside the CISNU, the Resistance quarterly newsletter from October 1977 until January 1979.

Mohammed Roshanaei served as the national secretary of ISAUS while attending college in Washington, D.C., in the late 1970s. Roshanaei expressed concern during these protests about the United States news reports often referring to Iranian demonstrators and protestors of the Shah as "terrorists".

== Protests and demonstrations ==
In June 1964, members of the ISAUS protested the Shah Pahlavi's visit to Beverly Hills and New York City. On April 28, 1968, an anti-war rally of 15,000 people was held at the Civic Center Plaza in San Francisco and included the Black Panther Party, Muhammad Ali, Bobby Seale, Black Muslims, the Socialist Workers Party, and 30 members of the ISAUS.

In 1976, the ISAUS was protesting the Shah in front of the French embassy in Houston, Texas and 100 protestors were arrested. In 1977, the Chicago Police Department were charged in United States court for working in conjunction with SAVAK, and spying for 7 years on the ISAUS group based in Chicago.

Protests by the ISAUS ramped up in 1978 and 1979, because of the Iranian Revolution events. In November 1978, national ISAUS protests were held in several cities of the span of the month, many of the protesters were Americans because some Iranian students were in fear of being killed for participating. In December 1978, the ISAUS held a protest with more than 2,000 participants against Shah Mohammad Reza Pahlavi at the Iranian Consulate and at the Federal building in San Francisco.

In 1979, Sonja Egenes proposed the state of Iowa to cut off student aid to all Iranians on the 34 campuses in the state, which prompted ISAUS to protest on campuses in the state.

== Publications ==
- Iran's Kent State & Baton Rouge. Berkeley, California: Iranian Students Association in the United States. 1973. OCLC 53380885.
- Pugh, Dave; Zimmerman, Mitch (1974). The "Energy Crisis" and the Real Cri$i$ Behind It. Gar Smith (graphics), Revolutionary Union (author), Committee Against the Energy Freeze (author), Iranian Students Association in the United States (author). San Francisco, CA: United Front Press.
- Shah's U.S. Visit: Nine Murdered Under Torture: Bidjan Jazani, Mashouf Kalantari, Abbas Sourki, Hassan Zia Zarifi, Aziz Sarmadi, Kazem Zolnavar, Mostafa Javan Khoshdel, Mohamad Choupan Zadeh, Ahmad Afshar, Washington, D.C.: Iranian Students Association, 1975
- U.S. Involvement in Iran: Part One, Imperialist Disguises and Liberal Illusions, 1900-1963. Supplement to Resistance, No. 1. Berkeley, CA: Iranian Students Association. 1978. OCLC 25459735.
- "Shah's Inferno – Abadan". Resistance, No. 2. Berkeley, CA: Iranian Students Association in the U.S. (ISAUS). December 1978. OCLC 62767227.

== See also ==
- National Student Association
- Operation Mockingbird
