= Zidell Companies =

American industrial conglomerate

- Company type: Private
- Industry: Manufacturing and shipbuilding
- Founded: Portland, Oregon, 1916
- Founder: Sam Zidell
- Headquarters: Portland, Oregon, United States
- Area served: World
- Products: Barges, steel tube fittings
- Services: Barge leasing
- Owner: Zidell family
- Number of employees: 200
- Subsidiaries: Zidell Marine, Tube Forgings of America

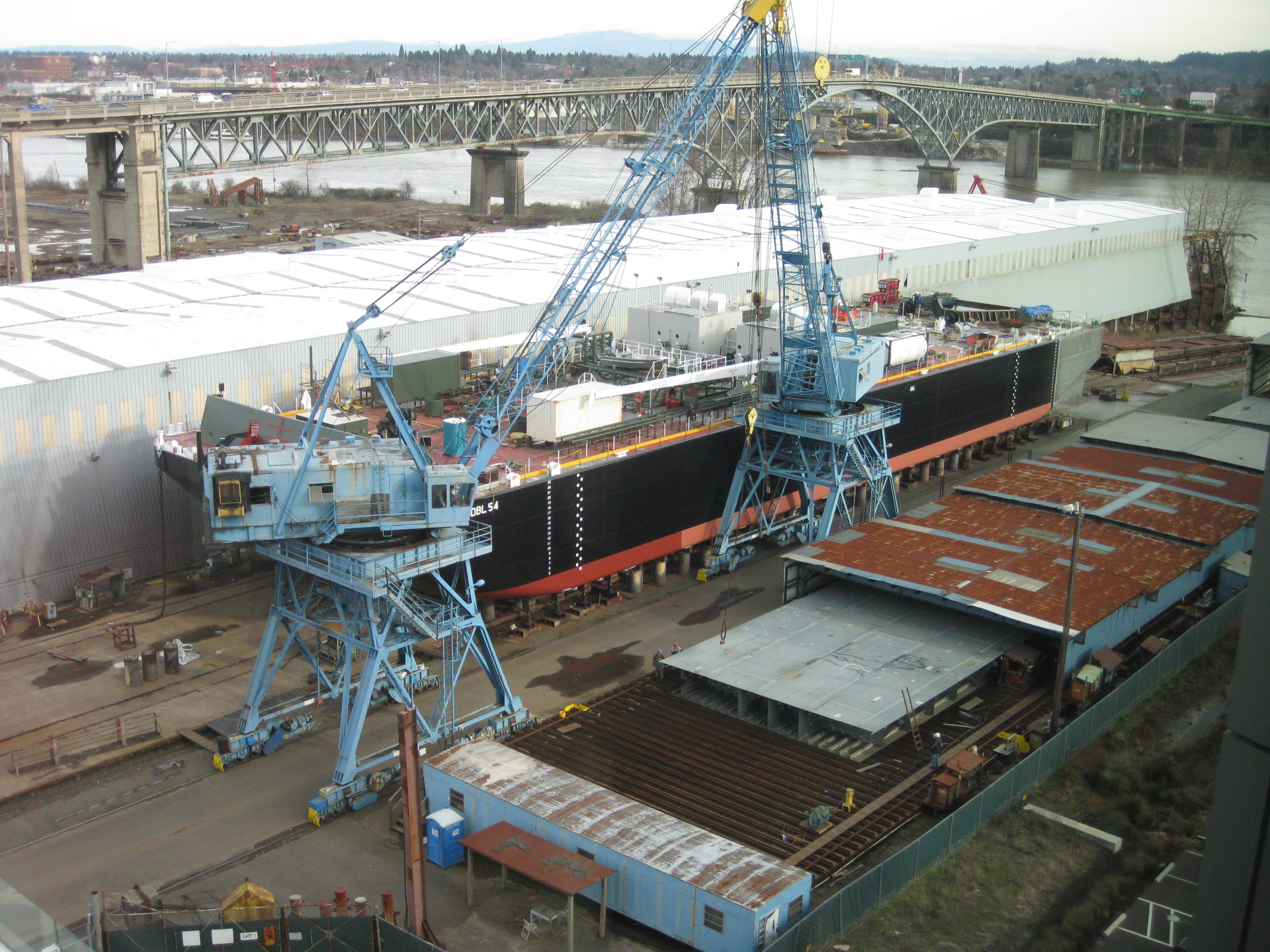
Zidell Marine, in the South Waterfront district of Portland, Oregon

The Zidell Companies are a group of family-owned companies based in Portland, Oregon, United States. They include Zidell Marine, a ship construction company which, from 1961 until 2017, specialized in the building of barges, and Tube Forgings of America Inc.

In the post-World War II era, Zidell became the largest shipbreaking operation in the United States. In September 2016, the company announced that it is preparing to shut down its barge-building business permanently and close its South Waterfront factory in 2017. The company launched its last barge in June 2017.

== History ==
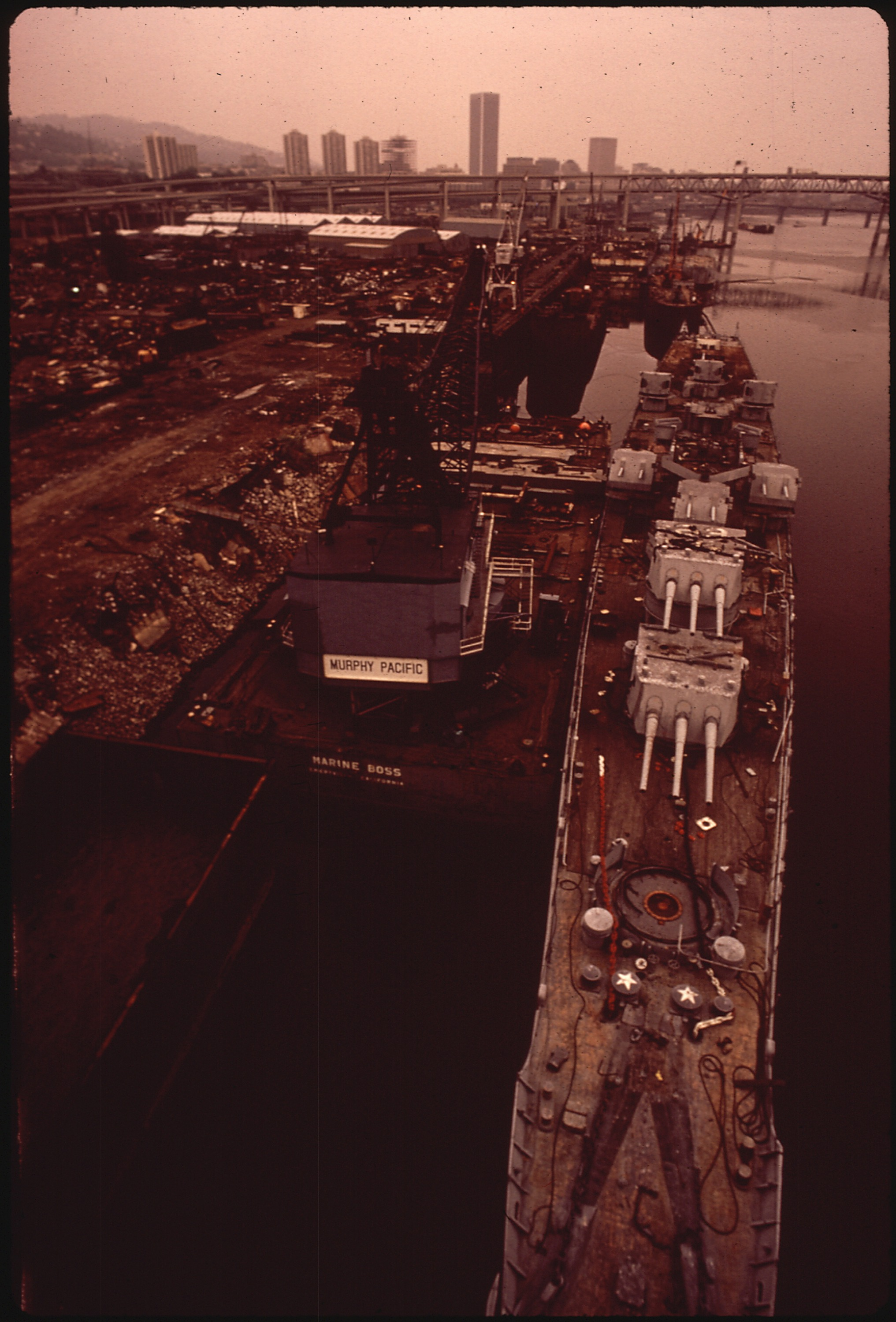
Zidell shipbreaking yard in September 1972. The ship being broken up is the heavy cruiser Baltimore.

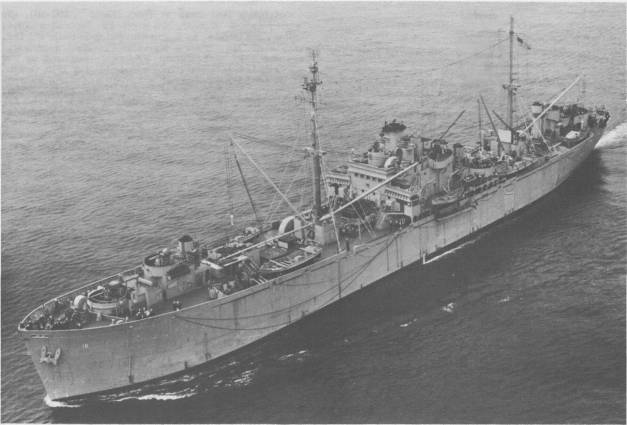
USS Kermit Roosevelt, a WWII-era naval auxiliary scrapped by Zidell

Zidell traces its origins back to 1912, when Sam Zidell (real name – Yeschie Zajdell) migrated to the United States from the small village Smidyn (Ukraine) and began selling secondhand machinery in Roseburg, Oregon. The following year he moved to Portland, and set up the Zidell Machinery and Supply Company, selling equipment and supplies to the region's expanding industrial base.

Shortly after the end of World War II, in 1946, Sam Zidell's son Emery, who now headed the business, purchased the shipyard of Commercial Iron Works in Portland and turned it into a shipbreaking yard, called the Zidell Ship Dismantling Company. With scrap steel in high demand for rebuilding America's industrial base in the postwar period, business boomed and by the 1960s the company, now known as Zidell Explorations, Inc., had become America's largest shipbreaker. In the course of its thirty years of shipbreaking operations, Zidell dismantled a total of 336 ships, including many World War II-era Liberty ships and naval auxiliaries, and some warships.

From 1948, Zidell also began to recover industrial valves from its shipbreaking operations and resell them, a business that was eventually spun off into the Zidell Valve Corporation. Zidell Valves was sold in 1997 to Pon Holdings of the Netherlands. In 1955, Emery Zidell also founded Tube Forgings of America, Inc. (TFA), which supplies welding fittings for a wide variety of applications. TFA was the first US manufacturer of carbon steel welding fittings to earn an ISO-9002 certification and is one of the world's largest manufacturers of such fittings today.

In 1960, Emery Zidell established the Zidell Marine Corporation, which used steel recovered from Zidell's shipbreaking business to build new barges. Demand soon outstripped the supply of recycled steel however, so Zidell began building barges from new steel. Between 1961 and 2017, when it discontinued its barge manufacturing, the company built 277 barges, varying in length between 150 feet (46 m) and 400 ft (120 m). During the final 15 years of production, most of Zidell's barges were double-hulled tankers. At its peak, Zidell Marine was employing 90 workers in barge production at its South Waterfront complex. In 2009, the total was 85, of which about 30 were administrative staff.

Since 1996, the company has been headed by Jay Zidell, the grandson of Sam Zidell.

In 2010, Emery Zidell’s grandson, Matt French, joined the company to explore and develop for Zidell Company.

In July 2011, the Zidell Company took part in a project to clean up the shoreline of the Willamette River. The project budget was $20 million and was directed at capping and removing dangerous contaminants, restoring wildlife habitat, and re-sloping and replanting the banks. Some of the land will be used for real estate development, including Zidell Yards.

Today, Zidell Marine and Tube Forgings of America remain family-run businesses, headed by Emery's son Jay. The companies currently employ some 200 people in the Pacific Northwest region of the United States. As of mid-2017, Tube Forgings had 140 employees working in its plant, located on NW Front Avenue near Kittridge Avenue, in Portland's Northwest Industrial area.

In September 2016, the company announced that it was preparing to shut down its barge-building business permanently and discontinue use of its 33-acre (13 ha) South Waterfront property in 2017. Zidell Marine launched its final barge on June 16, 2017. Subsequent removal of equipment from the site was expected to take several months. A separate barge-leasing business is to continue operating.
