= Confederation of Iranian Students =

Iranian student union

- Confederation of Iranian Students National Union
- کنفدراسیون جهانی محصلین و دانشجویان ایرانی – اتحادیهٔ ملی
- Abbreviation: CISNU
- Nickname: Confederation
- Predecessor: Iranian Students Association in the United States, Confederation of Iranian Students (Europe)
- Formation: Early 1960s
- Type: Non-Governmental Organization
- Website: https://cisnu.com/
- Formerly called: Federation of Iranian Students' Islamic Societies in Europe and America

Confederation of Iranian Students National Union (Persian: کنفدراسیون جهانی محصلین و دانشجویان ایرانی – اتحادیهٔ ملی; Konfederāsiyon-e Jahāni-ye Mohasselin va Dāneshjuyān-e Irāni – Ettehādiye-ye Melli, simply known as the Confederation, or the Federation of Iranian Students) was an international non-governmental organization purposed as the students' union of Iranians studying abroad active during the 1960s and 1970s. It was more active in Germany, France, England and the United States, among other countries. The Confederation was a politically autonomous organization, made up by sympathizers of different Iranian opposition groups to Shah.

== History ==
In 1952, the Iranian Students Association in the United States (ISAUS) had been founded, an effort by the Iranian embassy and American Friends of the Middle East, which has since been linked to the Central Intelligence Agency (CIA). In April 1960 student representatives from Germany, France, and England met in Heidelberg and established the Confederation of Iranian Students (CIS) in Europe. These two groups ISAUS and CIS merged to form the Confederation of Iranian Students National Union.

By the 1960s, there had been an international emergence of political opposition to the Shah Mohammad Reza Pahlavi's leadership in Iran. Many additional student groups supporting the Iranian opposition organized together to join the Confederation, including the Iran Liberation Movement, Socialist League of the Iranian National Movement, Revolutionary Organization of the Tudeh Party, Storm Marxist-Leninist Organization, as well as others.

In 1965, some CISNU leaders were arrested for attempting to murder Shah Mohammad Reza Pahlavi; as a result the event the group pushed towards more "radicalization". By 1971, the Iranian government stated CISNU to be an illegal group.

In 1973, 18,035 Iranian passport holders were officially recorded as living abroad on foreign student visas, 93% of whom were male. Of these students, 42% were living in the United States, 24% in Germany, 10% in the United Kingdom, 6% in Austria, and 5% in France.

=== Events ===
In May and June 1967, the Shah Mohammad Reza Pahlavi visited West Germany. On June 2, 1967 in West Berlin, Iranian and German students (including the Socialist German Student Union) protested the Shahs visit, and it resulted in one student dying. The CISNU were part of the forefront of European-wide protests in 1967 and 1968.

In the United States on October 14, 1971, a bomb exploded around 11:30 PM in the Iranian Consulate San Francisco located at 3400 Washington Street while the 2500th anniversary of the creation of the Persian Empire was being celebrated in Iran. The explosion did not cause any injuries. Prior to that, the consulate had been the site of protests against the Shah's regime and policies. So, some linked this event to the Confederation. However, the leaders of the Confederation of Iranian Students in the Bay Area denied responsibility.

During the late 1970s, Iranian student activists, seeking an Iran free of U.S. intervention, sought to inform Americans about the involvement of the CIA in a 1953 coup that had brought Mohammad Reza Pahlavi to Iran's throne. They urged US President Jimmy Carter to incorporate human rights into U.S. foreign policy.

== See also ==
- National Front (Iran), the opposing political party
