= War in the Garden of Eden =

1919 book

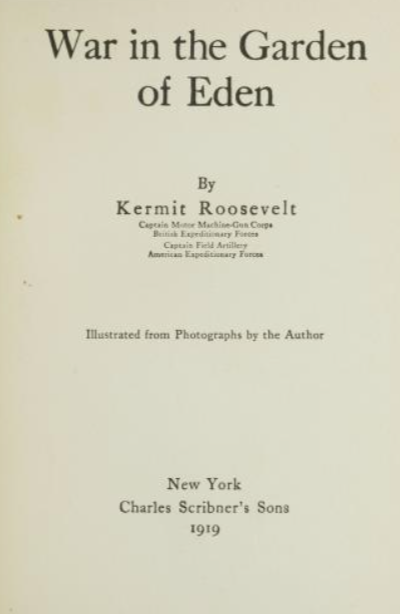
- Title page for War in the Garden of Eden (1919)
- Author: Kermit Roosevelt
- Subject: World War I
- Set in: Mesopotamia
- Publication date: 1919
- Media type: Print
- OCLC: 1481185
- Dewey Decimal: 940.415
- LC Class: D568.5

War in the Garden of Eden is a book written by Kermit Roosevelt in 1919 which recounts his experiences during World War I in Mesopotamia (Modern-day Iraq).
