= Committee for Justice and Peace in the Holy Land =

The Committee for Justice and Peace in the Holy Land was an organization founded in February 1948 by Virginia Gildersleeve and Kermit Roosevelt Jr., for the purpose of lobbying the Truman administration to oppose the creation of the State of Israel and to lobby the United Nations to "reconsider its disastrous decision" to divide the land west of the Jordan River into two states: one Jewish and one Arab.

== History ==
Barnard College Dean Emerita Virginia Gildersleeve was chairman, the Former President of the Union Theological Seminary Henry Sloane Coffin was Vice Chairman, and Kermit Roosevelt, grandson of President Theodore Roosevelt, was the committee's Executive Director.

The committee was later folded into the American Friends of the Middle East.

== Program ==
The Committee lobbied both the United States government and the United Nations to rescind the United Nations Partition Plan for Palestine, which proposed the creation of two states in the Middle East, one Arab and one Jewish, in favor of leaving the entire area under Arab rule with no provision for a national home for the Jewish people.

Gildersleeve proposed that the large number of Jewish displaced persons living in European Displaced Persons camps be resettled elsewhere, with the United States admitting 200,000, and each member state of the new United Nations taking "its proportionate share." She accepted at face value the notion that "The Arab nations have already offered to accept their share."

== Political positions ==
According to Gildersleeve, "The Zionist plan was directly contrary to our national interests, military, strategic, and commercial, as well as to common justice." She blamed the committee's failure to prevent the creation of the State of Israel on "the Zionist control of the media of communication."

On the other side, Martin Marty described the members of the committee as, "the usual company of anti-Zionists," including under this description, in addition to Gildersleeve and Roosevelt, "an editor of The Christian Century," members of the American Council for Judaism, and Harry Emerson Fosdick. Once the State of Israel was established in 1948 and then won a war against a coalition of Arab forces, Gildersleeve saw her political influence dissipate alongside that of her anti-Zionist compatriots, a process that continued unabated for the rest of her life.

== See also ==
- Jews Against Zionism (book)
- Anti-Zionism
