= Kermit Roosevelt Jr. =

American intelligence officer (1916–2000)

- Born: February 16, 1916; Buenos Aires, Argentina
- Died: June 8, 2000 (aged 84); Cockeysville, Maryland, U.S.
- Education: Harvard University
- Spouse: Mary Lowe Gaddis (m. 1937)
- Children: 4; including Mark
- Parent: Kermit Roosevelt (father)
- Family: See Roosevelt family
- Espionage activity
- Allegiance: United States
- Service branch: Office of Strategic Services; Central Intelligence Agency
- Operations: TPAJAX

Kermit Roosevelt Jr. (February 16, 1916 – June 8, 2000) was an American intelligence officer who served in the Office of Strategic Services during and following World War II. A grandson of Theodore Roosevelt, the 26th president of the United States, Roosevelt went on to establish American Friends of the Middle East and then played a lead role in the Central Intelligence Agency (CIA)'s efforts to overthrow Mohammad Mosaddegh, the prime minister of Iran, in August 1953.

== Early life ==
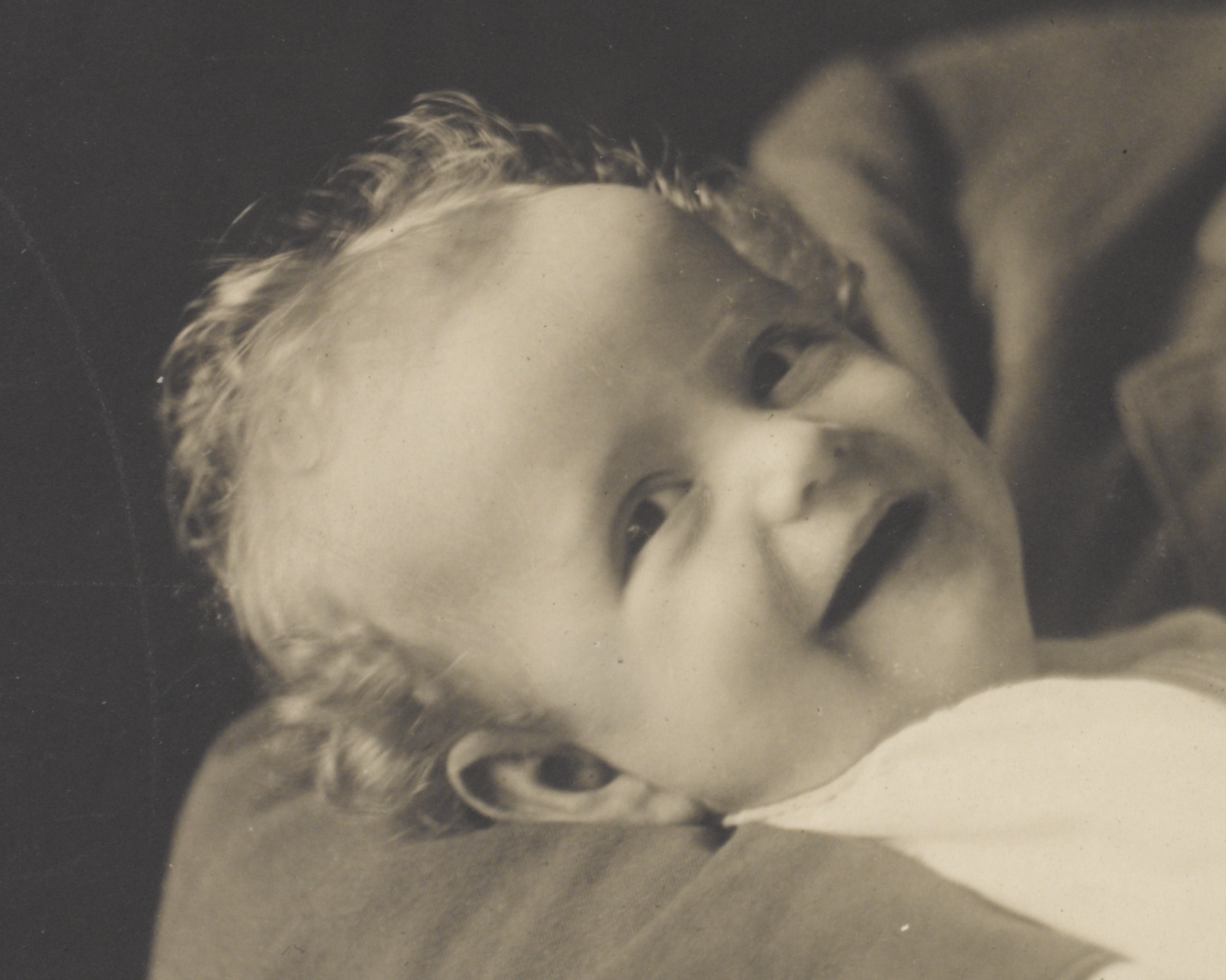
Kermit Roosevelt, Jr., in his grandfather's arms

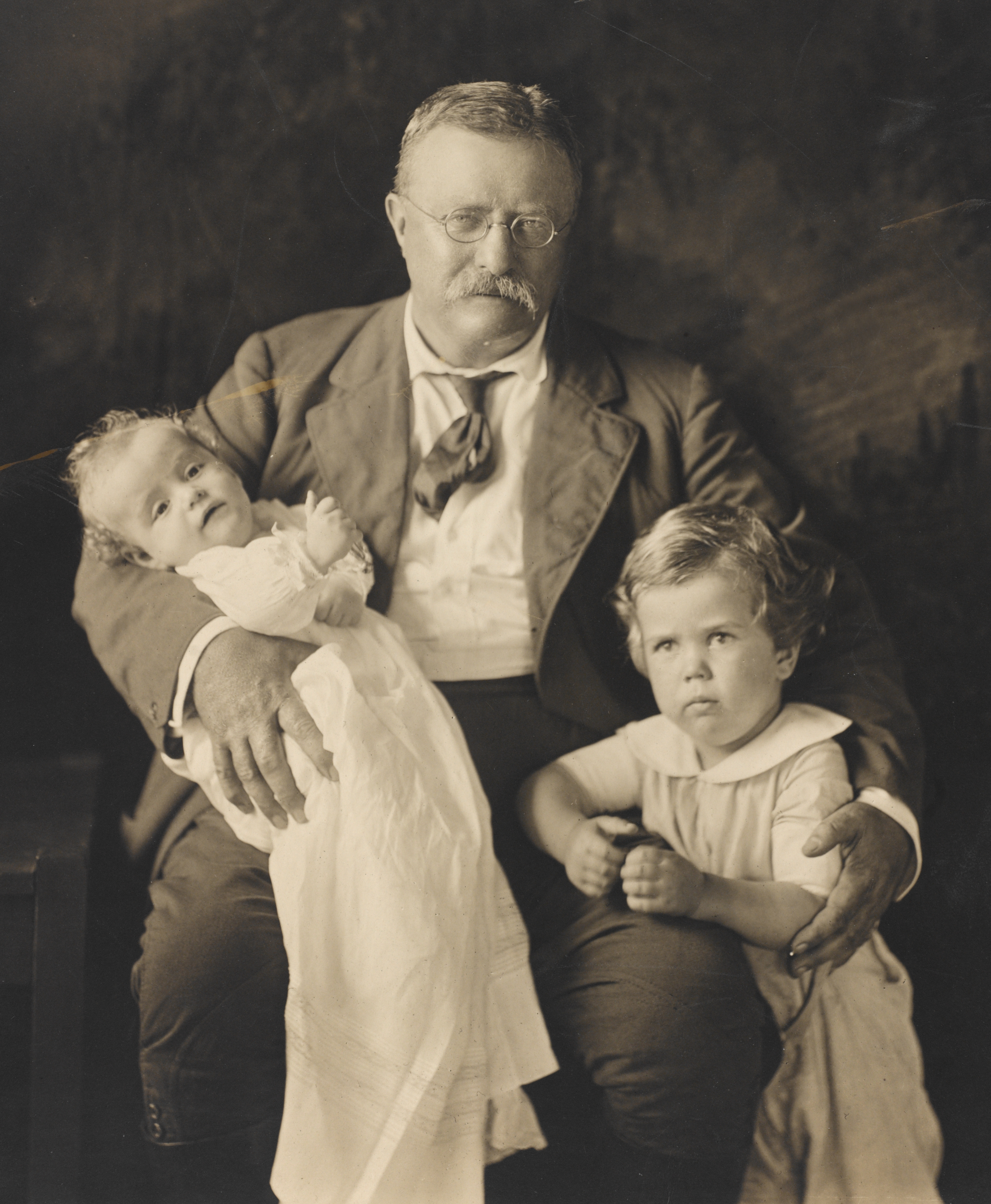
President Theodore Roosevelt with his grandsons Richard Derby (right) and Kermit Roosevelt Jr. (on his lap).

Kermit Roosevelt Jr. was born to Kermit Roosevelt Sr., son of U.S. president Theodore Roosevelt, and Belle Wyatt Roosevelt (née Willard) in Buenos Aires in 1916. At the time, Kermit Roosevelt Sr. was an official for a shipping line and then a manager of the Buenos Aires branch of the National City Bank. The Roosevelt family returned to the United States, and Kim, his two brothers, Joseph Willard and Dirck, and his sister, Belle Wyatt, grew up in Oyster Bay, New York, a homestead near Sagamore Hill, the Long Island home of the Roosevelt clan.

Kim attended Groton School as a young man. He graduated from Harvard University in 1937, a year ahead of his class. After graduating from Harvard, Roosevelt taught history at Caltech.

== Intelligence career ==
=== OSS ===
With the outbreak of World War II, Roosevelt joined the Office of Strategic Services (OSS), the forerunner to the CIA. On June 4, 1943, when Kim was 27, his father, Kermit Sr., committed suicide at Fort Richardson in Alaska where he was posted. Roosevelt Jr. remained with the OSS after the war and wrote and edited its history.

=== Postwar period ===
Roosevelt went on to serve on the advisory board of a largely Arab organization, the Institute of Arab American Affairs, a New York City-based organization, and Roosevelt wrote an essay in 1948 about his views on American Zionism and the partition of Palestine. In February 1948, Roosevelt joined more than 100 like-minded individuals to form a "Christian group" to aid the fight of the largely rabbinical American Council for Judaism to reverse the ongoing partition of Palestine into separate Jewish and Arab states. The Committee for Justice and Peace in the Holy Land (CJP) was founded on March 2, 1948, with Dean emeritus Gildersleeve serving as CJP chair, former Union Theological Seminary president Henry Sloane Coffin as vice-chair, and Roosevelt as executive director.

In 1951, Roosevelt, Virginia Gildersleeve, Dorothy Thompson, and a further group of 24 American educators, theologians, and writers (including Harry Emerson Fosdick) founded the American Friends of the Middle East (AFME), a pro-Arab organization often critical of U.S. support for Israel. The CJP, which Roosevelt had helped form in 1948, was subsumed into the AFME in 1951, and Roosevelt served for a time as the AFME executive secretary for the group of intellectuals and spokespersons. The historians Robert Moats Miller, Hugh Wilford, and others have stated that, from its early years, AFME was a part of an Arabist propaganda effort within the US that was "secretly funded and to some extent managed" by the CIA, with further funding from the oil consortium ARAMCO.

=== Cold War and CIA ===
In 1950 the head of the CIA's Office of Policy Coordination (OPC), Frank Wisner, recruited Roosevelt. Assigned to Egypt, Roosevelt impressed his colleagues with Project FF, which encouraged the Free Officers Movement to carry out a coup d'état in 1952, and Roosevelt developed close CIA links to the new leader, Gamal Abdel Nasser.

The historian Hugh Wilford attempts to describe Roosevelt's motivations and views underpinning his intelligence efforts and states:

[Roosevelt Jr.] had this notion of America forming an alliance with the Arab countries as they emerged from under the sway of Britain and France. He was very concerned with backing Arab nationalists in the region. He saw that as the best way of keeping it within the American orbit, as the Cold War was gathering momentum....

The views of the CIA Arabists were not in isolation: Wilford notes that the "Eisenhower administration [including Secretary of State John Foster Dulles, was] initially quite sympathetic towards... Roosevelt's Arabist agenda" and willing to oppose Middle Eastern régimes seen "as backing the Soviet Union rather than the U.S.". Ultimately, the emergence of American public support for Israel and the administration's evolving framework to respond to its principal Cold War adversary, the Soviet Union, would lead to failure of the Arabist agenda of Roosevelt and his colleagues. In discussing Roosevelt's role, Wilford describes him as being among "the most important intelligence officers of their generation in the Middle East."

Roosevelt played a highly important role in Operation Ajax (the 1953 coup d'état) in Iran as the ground operational planner, especially in getting the Shah to issue the firmans, or decrees, dismissing Mossadegh. He established networks of Anglophiles and sympathizers in Iran, who were willing to take part in various aspects of the coup. The tactics aided in dividing and dissolving Mossadegh's political power-base within the National Front, the Tudeh, and the clerics. However, the first attempt at the coup on 15 August 1953 failed, likely because Mossadegh had learned of his impending overthrow. Although the CIA telegraphed Roosevelt to flee Iran immediately, he began work on a second coup and circulated a false account that Mossadegh attempted to seize the throne and bribed Iranian agents. The second coup, a few days later, proved successful and hence was adapted as a model for use in other Third World countries during the Cold War. Eisenhower secretly awarded Roosevelt the National Security Medal in 1954 for his work. In 2014, the National Security Archive released telegrams and accounts of the CIA operation, many of which are revealing as to the part he played in the operation.

Roosevelt, 26 years after the Mossadeq coup, wrote a book about how he and the CIA had carried out the operation, Countercoup. According to him, he had slipped across the border under his CIA cover as "James Lochridge" on July 19, 1953.

Roosevelt submitted his Countercoup manuscript to the CIA for pre-publication approval. The agency proposed various alterations, and in the perspective of a CIA reviewer, "Roosevelt has reflected quite faithfully the changes that we suggested to him. This has become, therefore, essentially a work of fiction." The conclusion allowed the release of the book; a catalog of the actual changes made during the review is available.

A former senior adviser to the Obama administration and Council on Foreign Relations Iran expert, Ray Takeyh, wrote in 2014 that "Contrary to Roosevelt's account [in Countercoup], the documentary record reveals that the Eisenhower administration was hardly in control and was in fact surprised by the way events played out." William Blum wrote that Roosevelt had provided no evidence for his claim that a communist takeover in Iran was imminent but rather "mere assertions of the thesis which are stated over and over." Abbas Milani wrote, "Roosevelt's memoir inflated his own and, in turn, America's centrality to the coup. He tells the story with the relish of a John le Carré knock-off.... Eisenhower, for one, considered reports like this to be the stuff of 'dime novels.'"

After Iran, Roosevelt became assistant deputy director of the Directorate of Plans.

Dulles asked Roosevelt to lead the CIA-sponsored 1954 coup in Guatemala, which deposed the government of Jacobo Árbenz. Roosevelt refused: "AJAX had succeeded, he believed, chiefly because the CIA's aims were shared by large numbers of Iranians, and it was obvious that the same condition did not obtain among Guatemalans." Noting that Árbenz's resignation had been forced largely by rumors "that a full-scale U.S. invasion was imminent," Roosevelt later remarked, "We had our will in Guatemala, [but] it wasn't really accomplished by clandestine means."

Roosevelt left the CIA in 1958 to work for American oil and defense firms. He often visited former operatives and the Shah in Iran.

== Personal life ==
Roosevelt married Mary Lowe "Polly" Gaddis in 1937, and they had four children: Kermit III (father of Kermit IV, who also goes by Kermit III), Jonathan, Mark, and Anne.

== Death ==
Roosevelt died in 2000 at a retirement community in Cockeysville, Maryland. He was survived by his wife, children, a brother, and seven grandchildren.

=== Awards ===
Roosevelt was the recipient of the National Security Medal for his services in Egypt and Iran, which was awarded to him by Dwight D. Eisenhower in a secret ceremony on March 26, 1956.

== Selected bibliography ==
=== Articles ===
- "Propaganda Techniques of the English Civil Wars – and the Propaganda Psychosis of Today." Pacific Historical Review, vol. 12, no. 4 (Dec. 1943), pp. 369–379. doi:10.2307/3634062.

=== Pamphlets ===
- "Partition of Palestine: A Lesson in Pressure Politics." (Pamphlet No. 7). New York (160 Broadway): Institute of Arab American Affairs (Feb. 1948).

=== Books ===
- Arabs, Oil, and History: The Story of the Middle East. London (1948). ISBN 0804605327.
- Countercoup: The Struggle for the Control of Iran. New York: McGraw-Hill (1979). ISBN 0070535906.

== See also ==
- Theodore Roosevelt (grandfather)
- Kermit Roosevelt (father)
- Kermit Roosevelt III (grandson)
