= American Friends of the Middle East =

Pro-Arabist organization in the US

The American Friends of the Middle East (AFME) was an American international educational organization, formed in 1951. It was founded by columnist Dorothy Thompson, Kermit Roosevelt, Jr., Harry Emerson Fosdick, and 24 other American educators, theologians, and writers. The predecessor organization, with many of the same founders as the Committee for Justice and Peace in the Holy Land. The AFME organization was later linked to the Central Intelligence Agency (CIA). It existed as a pro-Arabist organization often critical of U.S. support for Israel.

== History ==
In 1948, Virginia Gildersleeve, Kermit Roosevelt, Harry Fosdick, and others had founded a similarly oriented Committee for Justice and Peace in the Holy Land, which was subsumed into the new organization.

Kermit Roosevelt, Jr. served as executive secretary of the AFME group of intellectuals and spokespersons for a time. In appealing for funds from American supporters "free from political pressure and racial and religious discrimination," the AFME is reported to have stated that "most Americans… never had an accurate picture of Middle East." The organization was active during the Cold War, and worked to place gifted international students in American universities. The mission of the organization was to "foster a nurturing connection" and "promote mutual understanding" between cultures. The group believed peace could happen through education and building human relationships. While students were living in the U.S., the AFME attempted to improve their experience with the establishment of student groups on campuses, and they had four key groups including the Organization of Arab Students, the Confederation of Iranian Students, and groups for Pakistani and Afghani students.

In 1952, the AFME co-founded (alongside the Iranian embassy) the Confederation of Iranian Students group. The first Iranian student organization was based at Lafayette College, under the supervision of Reverend Charles R. Hulac. In 1953, the AFMA opened up an office in Tehran in order to place Iranian students in "proper Protestant colleges and universities" in the United States, during a period of the Abadan Crisis. Hulac and his organization had ties to the earlier Protestant missionary work done in Iran.

=== CIA involvement ===
In 1967, Ramparts magazine disclosed a relationship between AFME and the CIA. Historians R.M. Miller, Hugh Wilford, and others have argued that from its early years, AFME was a part of an Arabist propaganda effort within the U.S., "secretly funded and to some extent managed" by the CIA, with further funding from the oil consortium Aramco. Anecdotal and first-hand accounts referenced by historians, in the absence of declassified intelligence documentation, have suggested that the American intelligence community used the AFME partially as a vehicle for establishing its intelligence network in the Middle East after World War II.

== Critical response ==
The Jewish Telegraphic Agency noted that the organization "does not include a single Jew among its charter members, but has among them numerous outspoken Anti-Zionists," and reported on a full page ad taken by the new organization in "the New York press" on June 27, 1951.

== See also ==
- American Board of Commissioners for Foreign Missions
- Confederation of Iranian Students
