= Dorothy Fosdick =

American foreign policy expert (1913–1997)

Dorothy Fosdick (April 17, 1913 – February 5, 1997) was an American foreign policy expert.

== Early life and education ==
She was the daughter of Harry Emerson Fosdick, who was the first pastor of the Riverside Church in New York City. She graduated from Smith College in 1934 and received a Ph.D. from Columbia University in 1939, subsequently returning to Smith College to teach for four years.

== Career ==
In 1942 Dr. Fosdick joined the United States Department of State, taking a membership position on the Policy Planning Staff of the Department of State from 1948 to 1953, and becoming the first woman to hold a prominent policy position in the State Department. Fosdick had also been a speech writer for Adlai Stevenson, with whom she had a brief romantic relationship.

Dr. Fosdick served as a professional assistant and foreign and defense policy adviser to Senator Henry M. Jackson from 1955 until Senator Jackson's death in 1983. In this capacity Dr. Fosdick served in Special Assistant and Staff Director positions on the Subcommittee on National Policy Machinery (1959–1962), Subcommittee on National Security, Staffing and Operations (1962–1965), Subcommittee on National Security and International Operations (1965–1973), Permanent Subcommittee on Investigations (1973–1981), and took over the post of Special Assistant for National Security Affairs in 1979. After Senator Jackson's death Dr. Fosdick posthumously edited two compilations of speeches by Senator Jackson, Henry M. Jackson and World Affairs: Selected Speeches, 1953-1983 and Staying the Course: Henry M. Jackson and National Security. Dr. Fosdick served as a member of the Board of Governors of the Henry M. Jackson Foundation, as well as the Visiting Committee of the University of Washington Henry M. Jackson School of International Studies, Seattle, Washington. Dr. Dorothy Fosdick died at her home in Washington, D.C., on February 5, 1997.

== Views ==
Contrary to the beliefs of her father, Harry Emerson Fosdick, Dr. Dorothy Fosdick immediately took to the political outlook of Reinhold Niebuhr and his concept of Christian realism, advocating for a continuum between the way in which the United States conducts domestic and world affairs. In 1955 Fosdick published Common Sense and World Affairs, a publication that pushed for what she saw as a common sense approach to international relations. Among the main points Fosdick covered she highlighted twelve major ones:

1. To know when to be scared is the beginning of wisdom.
2. Whoever says he has the solution to our problems speaks too soon.
3. To make a fine choice, yet decline to pay for it, is folly.
4. Fashioning your methods in the light of your end is prudence.
5. Sometimes to let things alone is sound sense.
6. Stealing a march on trouble is foresight.
7. To believe you are more generous than you really are is hazardous.
8. Asking only for immediate and tangible rewards is shortsighted.
9. Some things can only be good if the occasion is ripe.
10. Safety lies in acting on the truth of the matter, rather than the imagination of it.
11. To talk as well as you perform makes sense.
12. To do the good that is straight under your nose is vigilant.

== Bibliography ==
- Fosdick, Dorothy. 1939. What is liberty? A study in political theory. New York: Harper and Bros.
- Fosdick, Dorothy. 1955. Common sense and world affairs. New York: Harcourt, Brace, and Co.
- Fosdick, Dorothy, ed. 1987. Staying the course: Henry M. Jackson and national security. Seattle: University of Washington Press.
- Fosdick, Dorothy, ed. 1990. Henry M. Jackson and world affairs: selected speeches, 1953-1983. Seattle: University of Washington Press.
- Kaufman, Robert G. 2000. Henry M. Jackson: a life in politics. Seattle: University of Washington Press.
- Ognibene, Peter J. 1975. Scoop: the life and politics of Henry M. Jackson. New York: Stein and Day.
- Prochnau, William W. and Richard W. Larsen. 1972. A certain democrat: Senator Henry M. Jackson; a political biography. Englewood Cliffs, N.J.: Prentice-Hall, Inc.
- The Fosdick Family Papers, including the papers of Dorothy Fosdick are at the Sophia Smith Collection, Smith College.
