= Harry Castlemon =

American writer (1842 – 1915)

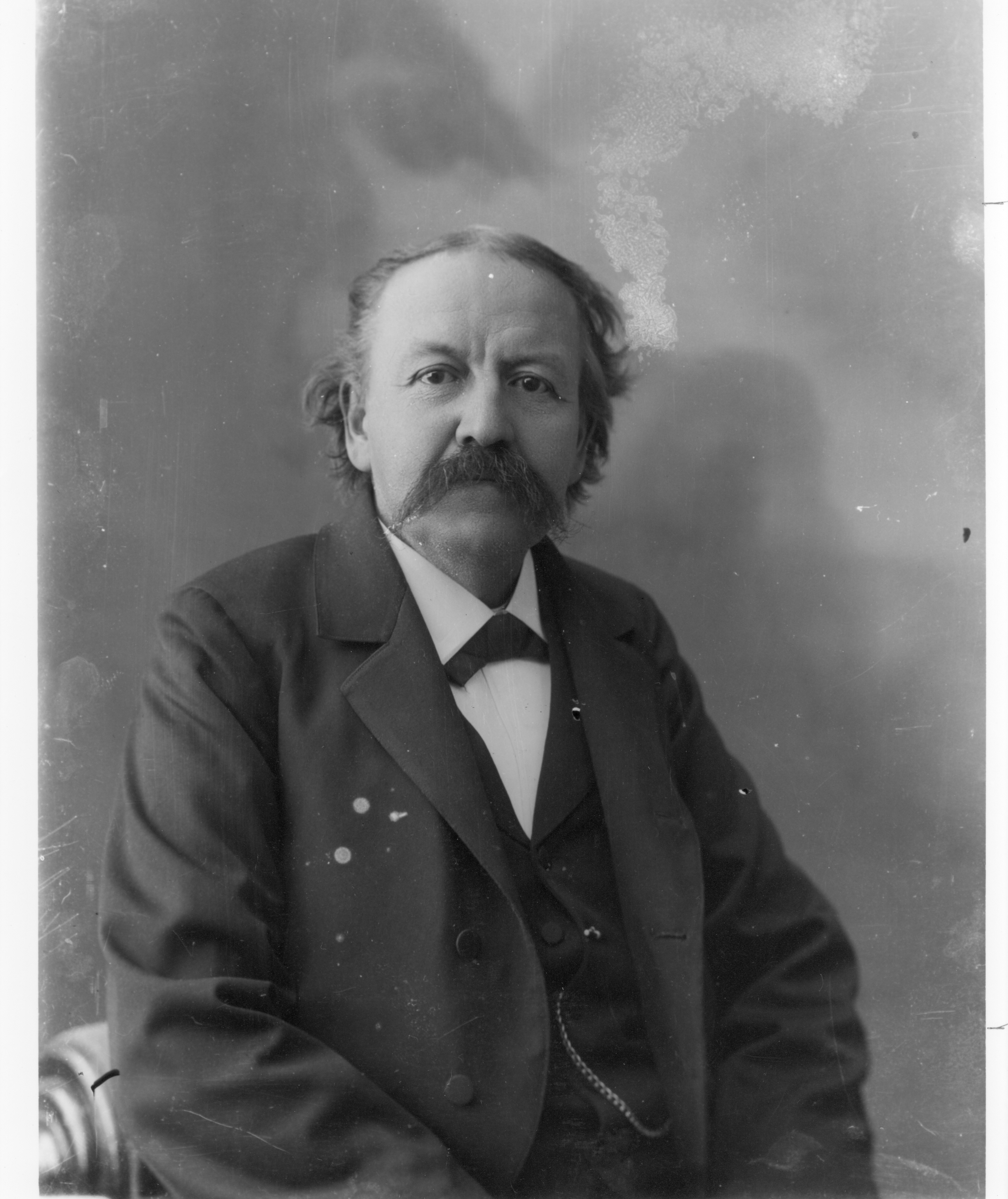
Charles Austin Fosdick, courtesy of the Patterson Library, Westfield, New York

Charles Austin Fosdick (September 6, 1842 – August 22, 1915), better known by his nom de plume Harry Castlemon, was a prolific writer of juvenile stories and novels, intended mainly for boys. He was born in Randolph, New York, and received a high school diploma from Central High School in Buffalo, New York. He served in the Union Navy from 1862 to 1865, during the American Civil War, acting as the receiver and superintendent of coal for the Mississippi River Squadron. Fosdick had begun to write as a teenager, and drew on his experiences serving in the Navy in such early novels as Frank on a Gunboat (1864) and Frank on the Lower Mississippi (1867). He soon became the most-read author for boys in the post-Civil War era, the golden age of children's literature.

Fosdick once remarked: "Boys don't like fine literature. What they want is adventure, and the more of it you can get in two-hundred-fifty pages of manuscript, the better fellow you are." Fosdick served up a lot of adventure in such popular book series as the Gunboat Series, the Rocky Mountain Series, the Roughing It Series, the Sportsman's Club Series, and The Steel Horse, or the Rambles of a Bicycle.

He was "Uncle Charlie" to famed liberal Baptist minister, Harry Emerson Fosdick, whose writings reflected fondly on the time spent as a boy visiting Fosdick at his home in Westfield, New York.

Fosdick married Sarah Elizabeth Stoddard in 1873, and they spent most of their married life in Westfield. They are buried beside each other in the Westfield Cemetery.

== Works include ==
- The Gun-boat Series
  - Frank, the Young Naturalist, 1864
  - Frank on a Gun-boat, 1864
  - Frank Before Vicksburg, 1864
  - Frank in the Woods, 1865
  - Frank on the Lower Mississippi, 1867
  - Frank on the Prairie, 1869
- The Rocky Mountain Series
  - Frank in the Mountains, 1864
  - Frank Among the Rancheros, 1865
  - Frank at Don Carlos' Rancho, 1868
- The Boy Trapper Series
  - The Buried Treasure, or, Old Jordan's Haunt, 1877
  - The Boy Trapper, or, How Dave Filled the Order, 1878
  - The Mail Carrier, 1879
- The War Series
  - True To His Colors, 1889
  - Rodney The Partisan, 1891
  - Rodney, The Overseer, 1892
  - Marcy The Blockade Runner. 1891
  - Marcy The Refuge
  - Sailor Jack, The Trader, 1893
- The Houseboat Series
  - The Mystery of Lost River Canyon, 1896
  - The Young Game Warden, 1896
- Roughing It Series
  - George in Camp, or, Life on the Plains, 1868
  - George at the Wheel, or, Life in the Pilot-house, 1881
  - George at the Fort, or, Life Among the Soldiers, 1882
- The Sportsmen Club Series
  - The Sportsman's Club: In the Saddle, 1873
  - The Sportsman's Club Afloat, 1874
  - The Sportsman's Club Among the Trappers, 1874
- The Go-Ahead Series
  - No Moss, or, The Career of a Rolling Stone, 1868
  - Go-ahead, or, The Fisher-boy's Motto, 1868
  - Tom Newcombe, or, The Boy of Bad Habits, 1896
- Afloat and Ashore Series
  - A Rebellion in Dixie, 1897
  - A Sailor in Spite of Himself, 1898?
- Frank Nelson Series
  - Snowed Up, or, The Sportsman’s Club in the Mountains, 1876
  - Frank Nelson in the Forecastle, or, the Sportsman's Club Among the Whalers, 1876
  - The Boy Traders, or, The Sportsman Club Among the Boers, 1877
- Rod and Gun Series
  - Don Gordon's Shooting Box, 1883
  - The Young Wild-fowlers, 1885
  - Rod and Gun Club, 1883
- Non-series books
  - Elam Storm, The Wolfer, or, The Lost Nugget, 1895
  - Joe Wayring at Home, or, The Adventures of a Fly-rod, 1886
  - Our Fellows, or, Skirmishes with the Swamp Dragoons, 1872
  - The Steel Horse, or, The Rambles of a Bicycle, 1888
  - A Struggle for a Fortune, 1902
  - Two Ways of Becoming a Hunter, 1892
  - Julian Mortmer, A Brave Boy's Struggle for Home and Fortune, 1887?
  - Oscar in Africa 1882, 1894
  - The Camp in the Foot-Hills, 1893
  - Guy Harris, The Runaway, 1887
  - A Ten Ton Cutter, 1897
  - Carl the Trailer, 1899
  - The First Capture, or, Hauling Down the Flag of England, 1900?
  - The Haunted Mine, 1915?
  - The Missing Pocketbook, or, Tom Mason's Luck, 1895
  - The Pony Express Rider, 1898?
  - Snagged and Sunk, or, The Adventures of a Canvas Canoe, 1888
  - The White Beaver, 1899?
  - Winged Arrow's Medicine, or, The Massacre at Fort Phil Kearny, 1901?
  - The Camp in the Foothills, or, Oscar on Horseback, 1893
  - Five Hundred Days in Rebel Prisons, 1887?
