= Kermit Roosevelt =

American explorer and U.S. Army officer (1889–1943)

Kermit Roosevelt MC
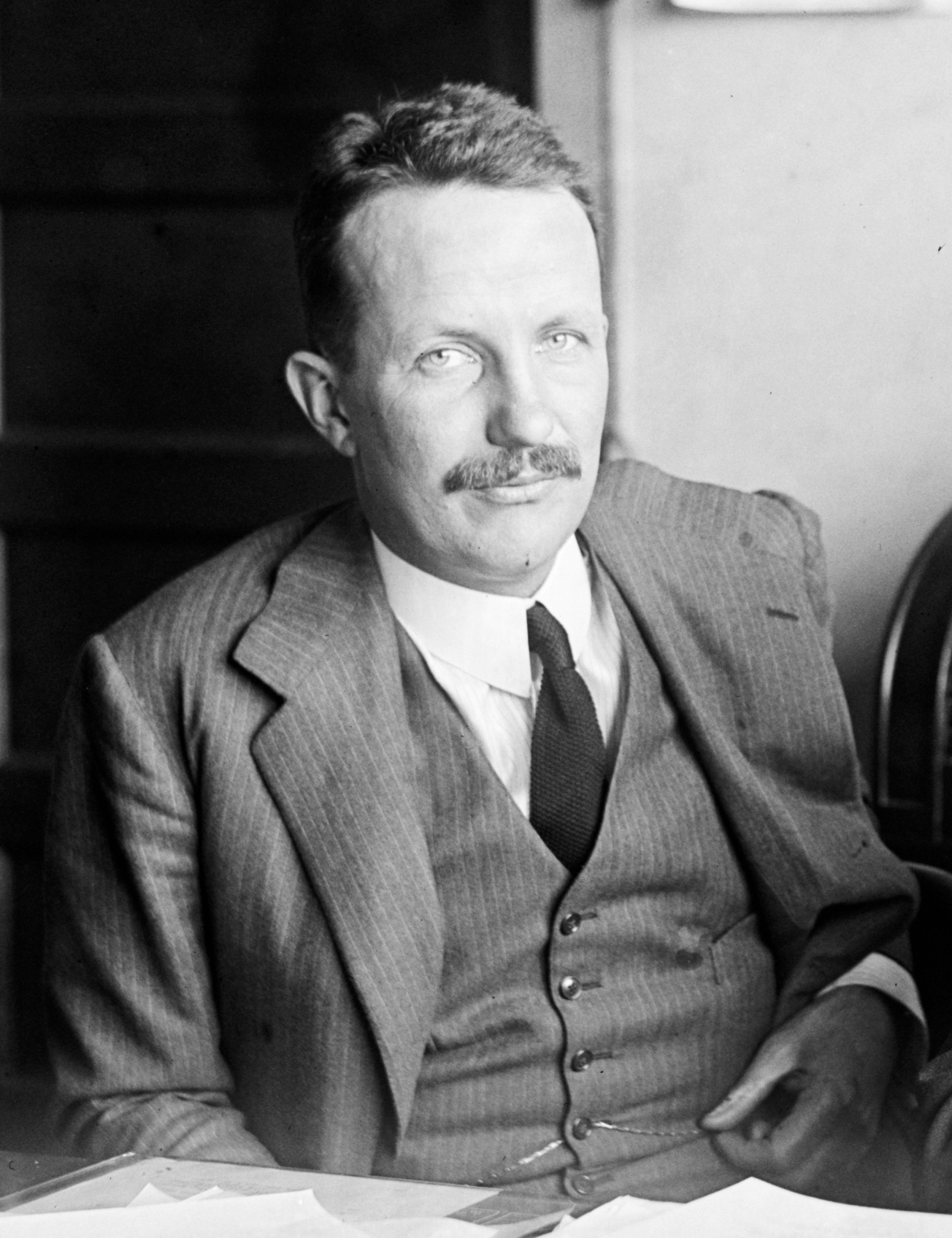
- Roosevelt in 1926
- Born: October 10, 1889; Oyster Bay, New York, U.S.
- Died: June 4, 1943 (aged 53); Fort Richardson, Alaska, U.S.
- Cause of death: Suicide by gunshot
- Education: Harvard University
- Occupations: Soldier, businessman, writer, explorer
- Spouse: Belle Wyatt Willard (m. 1914)
- Children: Kermit Jr.; Joseph; Belle; Dirck
- Parent(s): Theodore Roosevelt; Edith Roosevelt
- Family: See Roosevelt family

Kermit Roosevelt MC (October 10, 1889 – June 4, 1943) was an American businessman, soldier, explorer, and writer. A son of Theodore Roosevelt, the 26th President of the United States, Kermit graduated from Harvard College, served in both World Wars (with the British and U.S. Armies), and explored two continents with his father. He fought a lifelong battle with depression and died by suicide while serving in the US Army in Alaska during World War II.

== Childhood and education ==
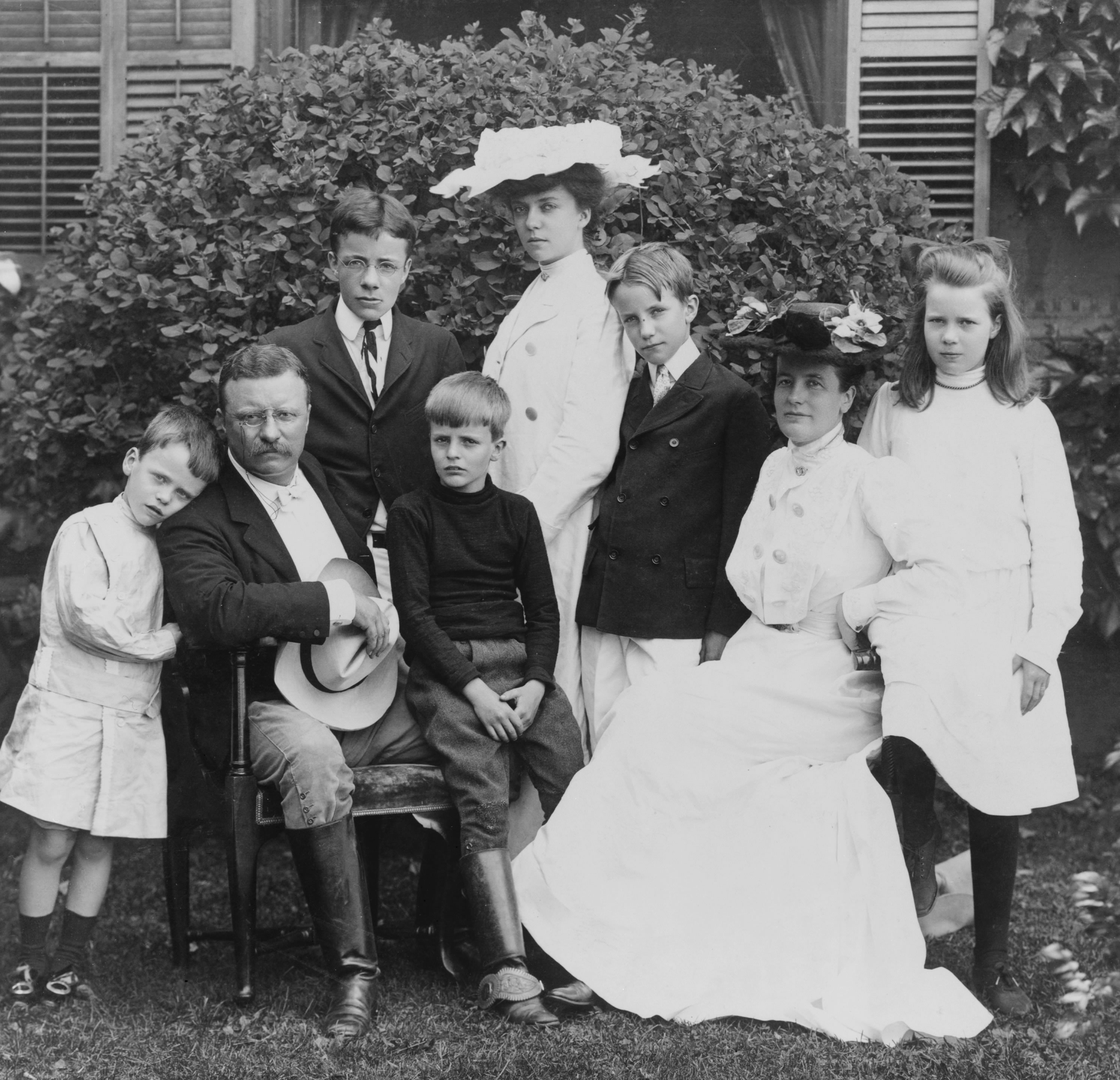
The Roosevelt family in 1903 with Quentin on the left, Theodore, Theodore III, Archie, Alice, Kermit, Edith, and Ethel

Kermit was born in 1889 at Sagamore Hill, the family estate in Oyster Bay, New York, the second son of Theodore Roosevelt, (1858–1919) and Edith Kermit Carow (1861–1948). He had an older half-sister Alice Lee Roosevelt (1884–1980), from his father's first marriage to Alice Hathaway Lee (1861–1884), an elder brother, Theodore III (1887–1944), a younger sister, Ethel Carow Roosevelt (1891–1977), and two younger brothers; Archibald Bulloch "Archie" Roosevelt (1894–1979) and Quentin Roosevelt (1897–1918).

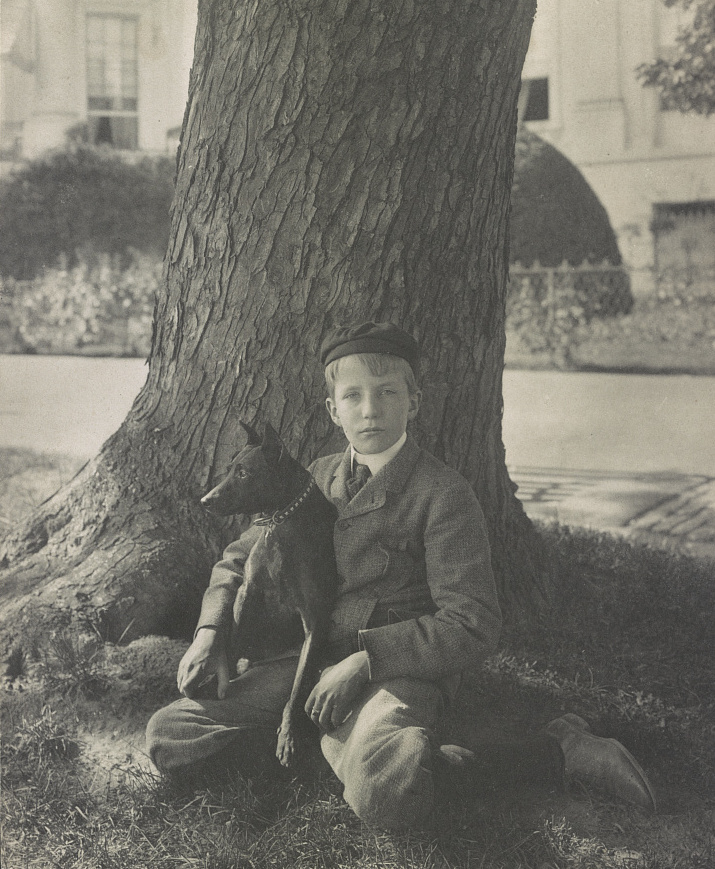
Kermit Roosevelt and his dog Jack, 1902

As a child, he had little resistance to illness and infection. He had a flair for language, however, and read avidly. He showed a writing talent that led to his recording his experiences in World War I in a book.

After attending the Groton School, he enrolled at Harvard College. In 1909, as a freshman, he and his father (recently out of office as president)—both of whom loved nature and outdoor sports—went on a year-long expedition in Africa funded by the Smithsonian Institution. After this trip and a swing through Europe, Roosevelt returned to Harvard and completed four years of study in two and a half years, graduating with the Class of 1912. Like his father, while at Harvard he was a member of the Porcellian Club, a student social organization.

Roosevelt became active in the Boone and Crockett Club, a wildlife conservation organization that had been co-founded by his father. One commentator wrote that Kermit embodied the ideals of the club perhaps more purely than anyone, including his father.

== River of Doubt South American expedition ==
Kermit Roosevelt grew a beard during the trip while he and his father fought loss of equipment, disease, drowning and murder during their 1913 expedition down the River of Doubt in the Amazon Basin.

One of Theodore Roosevelt's most popular books, Through the Brazilian Wilderness, recounted the expedition into the Amazon Basin Brazilian jungle in 1913–14. The father and son went on what would become known as the Roosevelt-Rondon Scientific Expedition, exploring the Brazilian jungle with explorer Colonel Cândido Rondon. During this expedition, they explored the River of Doubt, later renamed Roosevelt River in honor of the president, as well as a branch of that river named the Rio Kermit. The source of the river had been discovered by Rondon earlier, but it had never been fully explored or mapped.

At the time of the expedition, Kermit Roosevelt was newly engaged to Belle Wyatt Willard, daughter of the U.S. ambassador to Spain. His mother Edith, however, was concerned about her husband Theodore's health and the difficulties of a new expedition, and asked Kermit to accompany his father. He did so, reluctantly delaying his marriage.

The scope of the expedition expanded beyond the original plans, leaving the participants inadequately prepared for a trip tracing the River of Doubt from its source through hundreds of kilometers of uncharted rainforest. The climate and terrain, inadequate gear and food, and two deaths (one drowning, the other murder) turned a scientific expedition into an ordeal. Roosevelt's father contracted malaria and a serious infection resulting from a minor leg wound, weakening him to the point that he considered taking a fatal dose of morphine rather than being a burden to his companions. The younger Roosevelt told his father that he was bringing him back literally "dead or alive": so if he died, he would be an even bigger burden on the expedition. Although Kermit contracted malaria as well, he downplayed his sickness to save quinine for TR, nearly dying himself before the physician insisted on giving him the medication by injection. Kermit Roosevelt's determination and his rope- and canoe-handling skills were instrumental in saving his father's life, though TR would in later life be plagued by flareups of malaria and inflammation so severe that they required hospitalization.

Although Kermit and TR faced skepticism about their claims of navigating a completely uncharted river over 1000 km long, they eventually silenced their critics through TR's oratory and his popular book, Through the Brazilian Wilderness. The 1913–14 expedition was later recounted in the book The River of Doubt by Candice Millard (Doubleday 2005).

== Marriage and children ==
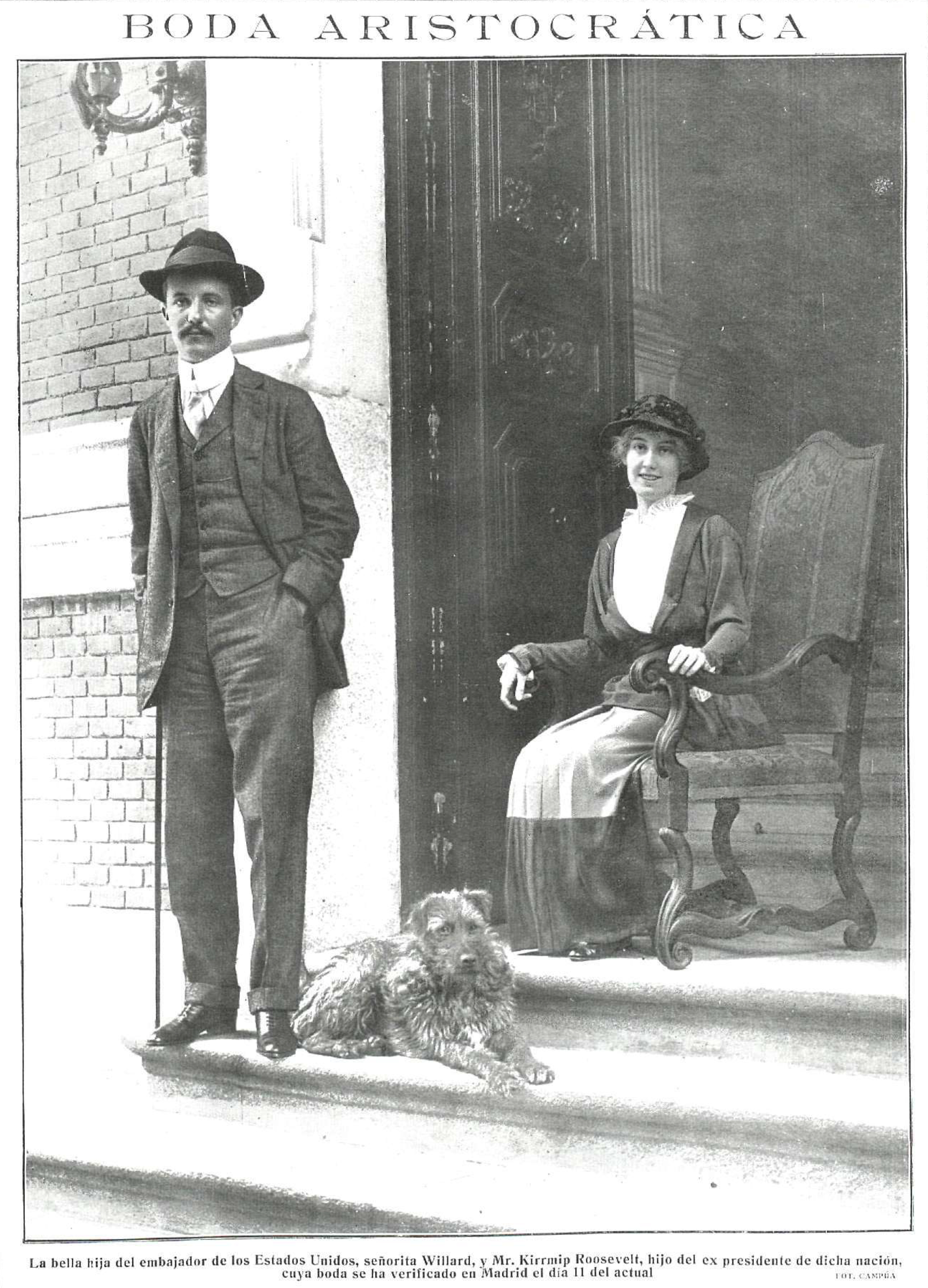
Kermit and Belle Roosevelt in Madrid, 1914

After the Amazon trip, in 1914 Kermit married Belle Wyatt Willard, daughter of the U.S. Ambassador to Spain, Joseph Edward Willard. They had four children: Kermit Roosevelt Jr., Joseph Willard Roosevelt, Belle Wyatt "Clochette", and Dirck. His daughter, Clochette Roosevelt, married John Gorham Palfrey, who was dean of Columbia College and a member of the United States Atomic Energy Commission.

== Military service in World War I ==
From 1914 to 1916, Roosevelt was assistant manager for National City Bank in Buenos Aires.

Kermit Roosevelt – John Singer Sargent's sketch from the cover of his book on his wartime experiences in Mesopotamia called War in the Garden of Eden.

In 1917, as he was about to be transferred to a Russian branch, the U.S. entered the World War. He attended the Plattsburg School for officers from May to July 1917 but resigned from the U.S. Army to join the British Army. On August 22, 1917, Roosevelt was appointed an honorary captain in the British Army. He saw hard fighting in the Near East, later transferring to the United States Army. While his other brothers had had summer training at Plattsburgh, New York, Roosevelt had missed out on this training.

Roosevelt joined the British Army to fight in the Mesopotamian campaign of World War I. He was attached to the 14th Light Armoured Motor Battery of the Machine Gun Corps, but the British High Command decided they could not risk his life and so they made him an officer in charge of transport (Ford Model T cars). Within months of being posted to Mesopotamia, he mastered spoken as well as written Arabic and was often relied upon as a translator with the locals. He was awarded a Military Cross on August 26, 1918.

Roosevelt relinquished his British commission on April 28, 1918, and was transferred to the American Expeditionary Force in France. In 1918, he learned that his youngest brother Quentin, a pilot, had been shot down over France and had been buried by the Germans with full military honors.

He was commissioned a captain in the United States Army on May 12, 1918, and commanded Battery C, 7th Artillery of the 1st Division. He participated in the Meuse-Argonne Offensive near the end of the war. He returned to the United States on March 25, 1919, and was discharged from the Army two days later.

== Between the wars ==
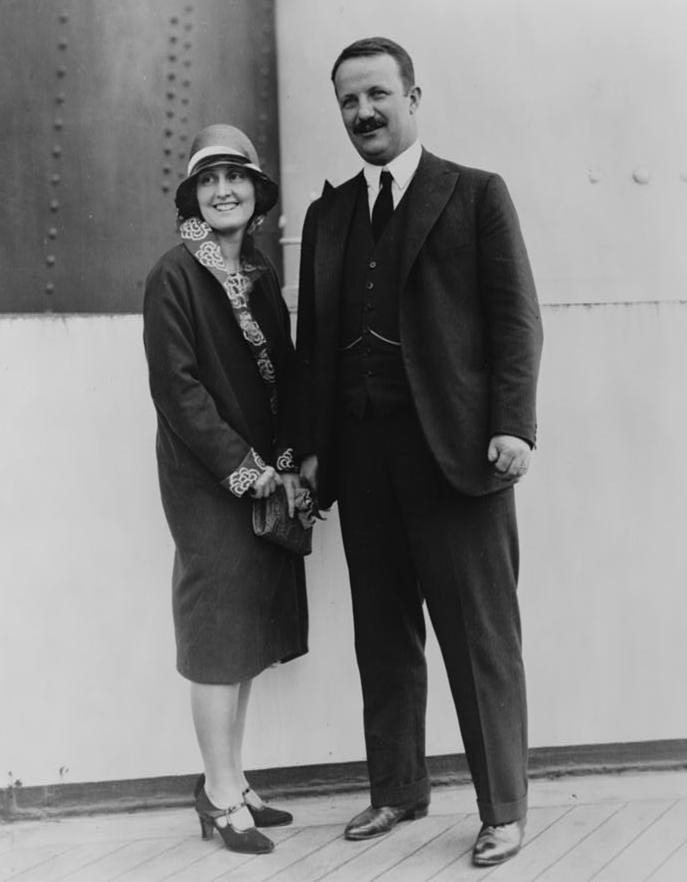
Belle and Kermit Roosevelt in 1928

After the war, Roosevelt went into business; he founded the Roosevelt Steamship Company and the United States Lines. He continued to enjoy outdoor activities with his brothers. In 1919, he joined the Empire State Society of the Sons of the American Revolution, to which both his father and elder brother belonged.

In 1925, Roosevelt accompanied his brother Ted on a hunting expedition across the Himalayas, over uncharted mountain passes rising from the Vale of Kashmir through the ancient Silk Route into China, in search of the legendary bighorn wild sheep called Ovis poli. He and his brother Ted documented the trip in their book East of the Sun and West of the Moon. Several trophies collected during this expedition are on display in the Field Museum of Natural History in Chicago. This expedition, financed by Field Museum trustee James Simpson, is sometimes called the "James Simpson-Roosevelt Asiatic Expedition of the Field Museum of Natural History".

In 1928–1929, Kermit Roosevelt and his brother Ted were members of the Kelley-Roosevelts Asiatic Expedition. The Roosevelt brothers told the story of their part in the expedition in their book Trailing the Giant Panda, in which they shot and killed a rare giant panda, which at the time was thought to be extinct. The discovery of the animal turned the panda into a big-game animal prized by hunters and a target for those seeking to steal cubs to display in American zoos. By the late 1930s, the panda species faced extinction and the last live pandas were poised to disappear.

Partly out of regret for the consequences of the panda hunt, Roosevelt and his brother Ted began working to shift attitudes in the scientific community. Where once scientists hunted and killed endangered animals in the name of biological discovery, Ted and Kermit advocated for reformed practices. Kermit was president of the Audubon Society from 1935 to 1937, where he argued for the preservation of bison and for the protection of a grove of Sitka spruce near the entrance to Yellowstone National Park. He also served as vice president of the New York Zoological Society from 1937 to 1939.

Kermit Roosevelt strengthened the relationship between the Republican and Democratic branches of the Roosevelt Family through maintaining a strong friendship with Franklin Delano Roosevelt. Between 1933 and 1935 Kermit and Franklin were traveling companions on five cruises aboard Vincent Astor's yacht Nourmahal.

== Service in World War II ==
By October 14, 1939, when Britain was at war with Germany, Roosevelt had negotiated a commission as a Second Lieutenant in the Middlesex Regiment with the assistance of his friend Winston Churchill, who was by then First Lord of the Admiralty. His first task was to lead a contingent of British volunteers for the Winter War in Finland. According to a contemporary story published in Picture Post, he had resigned from the British Army to lead the expedition. Among those photographed in the article are John Hurman and Edward Graham. Hurman describes himself as half-Irish and half-English and going as a pilot. His friend, using the pseudonym Edward Graham, also a pilot, was White Russian emigre Prince Emanuel Galitzine, the son of Prince Vladimir Galitzine. However, before the expedition could be launched, Finland made peace with Russia. Roosevelt served with distinction in a raid into Norway and was later sent to North Africa, where there was little action at the time. While in Norway, he was injured during the Battle of Narvik. He resumed drinking and was debilitated by an enlarged liver complicated by a resurgence of malaria. At the end of 1940, he returned to England and was discharged from the army on health grounds on May 2, 1941, by which time he had once again reached the rank of captain. Roosevelt appealed this discharge all the way to the British Prime Minister, Winston Churchill, who upheld the medical discharge.

When he returned to the US, he turned to drinking to forget his problems. His wife enlisted the help of his cousin, President Franklin Delano Roosevelt, who ordered the FBI to track him down, and he was brought back to his family. In late April 1942, his brother Archibald sought to have him committed to a sanitarium for a year; instead, he agreed to a four-month stay at an institution in Hartford. To extricate him from his current situation, the President gave him a commission as a major in the United States Army, and had him transferred and posted to Fort Richardson, Alaska, where he worked as an intelligence officer and helped establish a territorial occupation militia of Inupiat and Aleut individuals. He was a member of Veterans of Foreign Wars Post 1685 in Anchorage, Alaska.

== Death ==
Roosevelt died by suicide in Alaska on June 4, 1943, in his room at Fort Richardson, from a gunshot to the head. He was discovered by Dr. Sanford Couch Monroe, who later filed the autopsy report. His death was reported to his mother, Edith, as a heart attack. He was interred in Fort Richardson National Cemetery near Anchorage, where a memorial stone gateway was erected in his honor in 1949.

== Legacy ==
Three towns in the United States are named for Kermit Roosevelt: Kermit, Texas (he had visited Winkler County, Texas, a few months earlier to hunt antelope), Kermit, West Virginia, and Kermit, North Dakota.

The Luzon-class repair ship USS Kermit Roosevelt (ARG-16) was named in his honor.

There is also an annual lecture series—given in the United States by a British Army general officer and in the United Kingdom by a U.S. Army general officer—named in memory of Kermit Roosevelt.

== Awards ==
=== United States ===
- World War I Victory Medal
- Army of Occupation of Germany Medal
- Asiatic-Pacific Campaign Medal
- World War II Victory Medal

=== Foreign decorations ===
- Military Cross (United Kingdom)
- Montenegro War Cross

=== Foreign medals ===
- British War Medal (United Kingdom)
- Victory Medal (United Kingdom)
- 1939-1945 Star (United Kingdom)
- Africa Star (United Kingdom)
- War Medal 1939–1945 (United Kingdom)

== In fiction ==
Kermit Roosevelt appears as a minor character in the Wilbur Smith novel Assegai on safari in East Africa with his father.

Kermit Roosevelt appears in the second episode of 1992's The Young Indiana Jones Chronicles television series.

He also appears fleetingly (in a dream) in William Boyd's novel An Ice-Cream War.

The book Roosevelt's Beast by Louis Bayard is a fictitious story of the Rondon-Roosevelt expedition, narrated by Kermit Roosevelt.

Kermit Roosevelt appears as a main character in the James Ross historical fiction Hunting Teddy Roosevelt about the safari in East Africa with his father.

Kermit Roosevelt appears in the fiction book The President's Daughter by Kimberly Brubaker Bradley which is based on Kermit's sister Ethel Roosevelt Derby and their time in the White House.

== Works ==
- War in the Garden of Eden: memoirs from World War I.
- The Happy Hunting Grounds. New York, C. Scribner's sons. 1920.
- Trailing the Giant Panda (with Theodore Roosevelt Jr.).
- Quentin Roosevelt: A Sketch with Letters. New York, C. Scribner's Sons. 1921.
- The Boy Scout's Book of True Adventure, Fourteen Honorary Scouts, with Foreword By Theodore Roosevelt and Biographical Notes By James E. West. Published by G. P. Putnam's Sons, New York (1931) – Essays include: "Adventurous Hunting" by Kermit Roosevelt, "Scouting Against the Apache" by Frederick R. Burnham, "How I Learned to Fly" by Orville Wright, "An Arctic Mirage" by Donald B. MacMillan, "In the Arctic" by Lincoln Ellsworth, "A Tobacco Trade" by George Bird Grinnell, "The Black Ghosts of the Tana River" by James L. Clark, "My Flight Over the Atlantic" by Richard Evelyn Byrd, "In the Jungles of Cochin-China" by Theodore Roosevelt, "Shipwreck" by Robert A. Bartlett, "Written in the Air" by Charles Lindbergh, "Tiger! Tiger!" by Merian C. Cooper, "The First Crossing of the Polar Sea" by Lincoln Ellsworth, "Bandits" by Clifford H. Pope, and "Adventure" by Stewart Edward White. The book contains 13 photo plates of the honorary Scouts: all fourteen are present, both Roosevelts appear in the same photo.
- East of the Sun and West of the Moon (with Theodore Roosevelt Jr).
- The Long Trail, 1921, Charles Scribner's Sons, New York.

== See also ==
- Kermit Roosevelt, Jr. (son)
- Kermit Roosevelt III (grandson)
