= USS Kermit Roosevelt =

Luzon-class ship

USS Kermit Roosevelt (ARG-16)
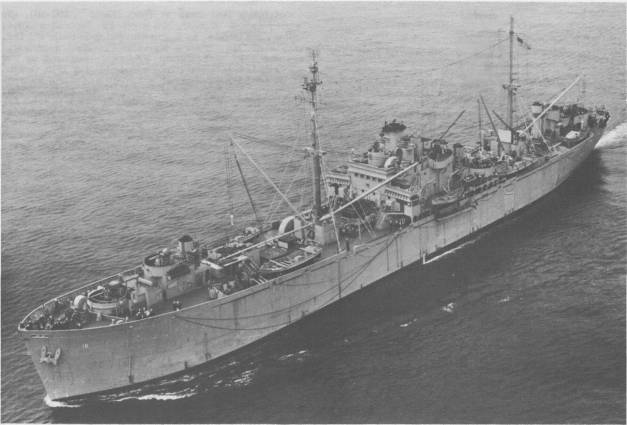
- USS Kermit Roosevelt (ARG-16) c.1945

History

United States
- Namesake: Kermit Roosevelt
- Builder: Bethlehem-Fairfield Shipyard, Inc., Baltimore, Maryland
- Laid down: 30 August 1944
- Launched: 5 October 1944
- Commissioned: 31 May 1945
- Decommissioned: 31 October 1959
- Stricken: 1 January 1960
- Motto: Facta Non Verba; (Deeds, not words)
- Honours and awards: 3 battle stars (Korea)
- Fate: Sold for scrapping, 25 August 1960

General characteristics
- Type: Luzon-class internal combustion engine repair ship
- Displacement: 5,159 long tons (5,242 t) light; 8,700 long tons (8,840 t) full
- Length: 441 ft 6 in (134.57 m)
- Beam: 56 ft 11 in (17.35 m)
- Draft: 23 ft (7.0 m)
- Propulsion: Reciprocating steam engine, single shaft
- Speed: 12.5 knots (14.4 mph; 23.2 km/h)
- Complement: 401 officers and enlisted
- Armament: 1 × 5"/38 caliber gun; 3 × 3"/50 caliber guns; 4 × 40 mm guns; 12 × 20 mm guns

USS Kermit Roosevelt (ARG-16) was a Luzon-class internal combustion engine repair ship that saw service in the United States Navy during World War II. She was the only U.S. Naval vessel to be named for Kermit Roosevelt I, the second son of President Theodore Roosevelt and a soldier who served in two world wars.

Originally built as SS Deal Island, a Maritime Commission type (EC-2-S-C1) hull, under Maritime Commission contract (MCE 2680) at the Bethlehem-Fairfield Shipyard, Inc. in Baltimore, Maryland, keel was laid down 30 August 1944; she was renamed USS Kermit Roosevelt (ARG-16) on 29 September 1944; launched on 5 October; sponsored by Mrs. Kermit Roosevelt (Roosevelt's widow); acquired by the Navy 21 October; and commissioned on 31 May 1945.

== Service history ==
After shakedown along the Virginia coast, Kermit Roosevelt departed Norfolk, Virginia, on 21 July for duty in the Pacific Ocean. Steaming via Pearl Harbor and Okinawa, she arrived Qingdao, China, on 16 October and began service as a station repair ship. A unit of ServRon 10, she supported U.S. Naval forces aiding the Nationalist government in mainland China. She departed Qingdao 11 March 1946 and arrived Hong Kong on 16 March for five months of similar duty. Thereafter serving briefly at Guam and Saipan, she returned to Bremerton, Washington, on 3 February 1947.

Clearing San Pedro Bay 21 April, Kermit Roosevelt returned to Qingdao 4 September and provided ship repair services there until 28 February 1949. Then she continued operations in the Philippines and the Pacific until departing Kwajalein Atoll in the Marshall Islands for the West Coast 8 June. Steaming via Pearl Harbor, she reached San Diego, California, on 24 July. On 23 January 1950 she sailed for the Central Pacific; and, before returning to San Diego 12 June, she provided repair facilities at Kwajelein and Majuro in the Marshall Islands, Truk in the Caroline Islands, and Nauru in the Gilbert Islands. Between 10 July 1950 and 23 October 1953 Kermit Roosevelt made four deployments to the Far East. Operating out of Sasebo, Japan, she repaired ships engaged in the Korean War and in the Strait of Formosa. From 10 October to 27 November 1950 she supported Task Group 95.6 at Wonsan, Korea, and during 13–23 December she performed similar duty at Hungnam for ships of Task Group 79.2. And while operating out of Pusan from 7 August to 16 September 1953, she helped salvage SS Cornhusker Marine.

Kermit Roosevelt returned to Long Beach, California, on 23 October 1953 and operated along the West Coast until she again sailed for the Far East 6 October 1954. Between then and 30 April 1956 she made two more deployments to the Western Pacific, where she provided important repair services for the Seventh Fleet. After returning to the United States in 1956, Kermit Roosevelt operated out of Long Beach until she departed 1 October 1959 for Bremerton, Washington arriving 7 October. She decommissioned on 31 October and entered the Pacific Reserve Fleet, Bremerton. Her name was struck from the Naval Vessel Register on 1 January 1960, and she transferred to the Maritime Administration 23 June. On 25 August 1960 she was sold to Zidell Explorations, Inc. for scrap.

Kermit Roosevelt received three battle stars for Korean War service.
