= Harry Emerson Fosdick =

American pastor and controversialist (1878–1969)

The Reverend Harry Emerson Fosdick
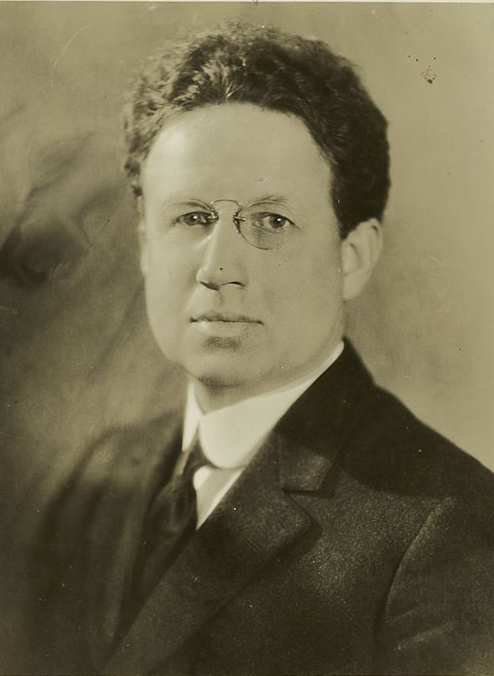
- Born: May 24, 1878; Buffalo, New York, U.S.
- Died: October 5, 1969 (aged 91); Bronxville, New York, U.S.
- Education: BA, Colgate University, 1900 studied at Colgate Seminary, 1900–1901; BD, Union Theological Seminary, 1904; MA, Columbia University, 1908
- Occupation: Protestant Christian minister
- Spouse: Florence Allen Whitney
- Children: Elinor Fosdick Downs, Dorothy Fosdick
- Parent(s): Frank Sheldon Fosdick, Amy Inez Fosdick

Ecclesiastical career
- Church: Baptist
- Ordained: November 18, 1903
- Congregations: First Baptist Church, Montclair, NJ, 1904–15; First Presbyterian Church ("Old First" of Manhattan), New York City, NY, 1918–25; Park Avenue Baptist Church/Riverside Church, New York City, NY, 1925–30/1930–46
- Offices held: Pastor, associate pastor

Harry Emerson Fosdick (May 24, 1878 – October 5, 1969) was an American Mainline Protestant pastor. Fosdick became a central figure in the fundamentalist–modernist controversy within American Protestantism in the 1920s and 1930s and was one of the most prominent liberal ministers of the early 20th century. Although a Baptist, he was called to serve as pastor, in New York City, at First Presbyterian Church in Manhattan's West Village, and then at the historic, inter-denominational Riverside Church in Morningside Heights, Manhattan.

== Career ==
Born in Buffalo, New York, Fosdick graduated from Colgate University in 1900 and from Union Theological Seminary in 1904. While attending Colgate University he joined the Delta Upsilon fraternity. He was ordained a Baptist minister in 1903 at Madison Avenue Baptist Church at 31st Street, Manhattan.

He was called as minister to First Baptist Church, Montclair, New Jersey, in 1904, serving until 1915. He supported US participation in the First World War (later describing himself as a "gullible fool" in doing so), and in 1917 volunteered as an Army chaplain, serving in France.

In 1918, he was called to First Presbyterian Church, and on May 21, 1922, he delivered his famous sermon Shall the Fundamentalists Win?, in which he defended the modernist position. In that sermon he presented the Bible as a record of the unfolding of God's will, not as the literal "Word of God". He saw the history of Christianity as one of development, progress, and gradual change. Fundamentalists regarded this as rank apostasy, and the battle-lines were drawn.

Fosdick's sermon prompted a response from the Rev. Clarence Edward Macartney of Arch Street Presbyterian Church in Philadelphia on July 13, 1922, with a sermon entitled "Shall Unbelief Win?". Like Fosdick's sermon, Macartney's sermon was published and sent to church leaders across America. "There are not a few," said Macartney, "who do not think of themselves as either 'Fundamentalists' or 'Modernists', but as Christians, striving amid the dust and the confused clamor of this life to hold the Christian faith and follow the Lord Jesus Christ, who will read this sermon with sorrow and pain."

The national convention of the General Assembly of the old Presbyterian Church in the USA in 1923 charged his local presbytery in New York to conduct an investigation into Fosdick's views. A commission began an investigation, as required. His defense was conducted by a lay elder, John Foster Dulles (1888–1959, future Secretary of State under President Dwight D. Eisenhower in the 1950s), whose father was a well-known liberal Presbyterian seminary professor. Fosdick escaped probable censure at a formal trial by the 1924 General Assembly by resigning from the First Presbyterian Church (historic "Old First") pulpit in 1924. He was immediately called as pastor of a new type of Baptist church ministry at Park Avenue Baptist Church, whose most famous member was the industrialist, financier and philanthropist John D. Rockefeller Jr. Rockefeller then funded the famed ecumenical Riverside Church (later a member of the American Baptist Churches and United Church of Christ denominations) in Manhattan's northwestern Morningside Heights area near Columbia University, where Fosdick became pastor as soon as the doors opened in October 1930.

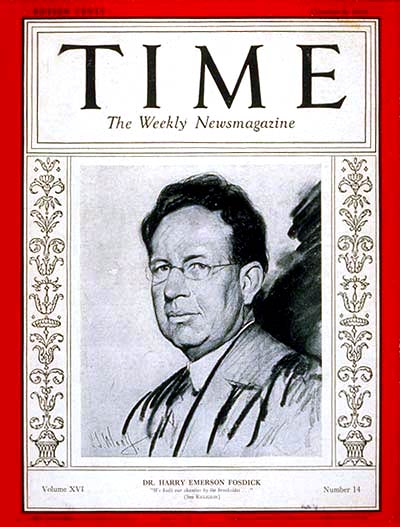
Time from October 6, 1930

This prompted a Time cover story on October 6, 1930 (pictured), in which Time said that Fosdick:

proposes to give this educated community a place of greatest beauty for worship. He also proposes to serve the social needs of the somewhat lonely metropolite. Hence on a vast scale he has built all the accessories of a community church—gymnasium, assembly room for theatricals, dining rooms, etc. ... In ten stories of the 22-story belltower are classrooms for the religious and social training of the young

Fosdick was the preacher for NBC Blue's National Vespers from 1927 to 1946.

Fosdick outspokenly opposed racism and injustice. Ruby Bates credited him with persuading her to testify for the defense in the 1933 retrial of the infamous and racially charged legal case of the Scottsboro Boys, which tried nine black youths before all-white juries for allegedly raping white women (Bates and her companion, Victoria Price) in Alabama.

Fosdick was a guest preacher at Central Congregational Church in Providence, Rhode Island.

== Sermons and publications ==
Fosdick's sermons won him wide recognition. His 1933 anti-war sermon, "The Unknown Soldier", inspired the British priest Dick Sheppard to write a letter that ultimately led to the founding of the Peace Pledge Union. His Riverside Sermons was printed in 1958, and he published numerous other books. His radio addresses were nationally broadcast by the BBC; he also wrote the hymn "God of Grace and God of Glory".

Fosdick's book A Guide to Understanding the Bible traces the beliefs of the people who wrote the Bible, from the ancient beliefs of the Hebrews (which he regarded as practically pagan) to the faith and hopes of the New Testament writers.

Fosdick was an advocate of theistic evolution. He defended the teaching of evolution in schools and rejected creationism. He was involved in a dispute with the creationist William Jennings Bryan.

Fosdick reviewed the first edition of the book Alcoholics Anonymous: The Story of How More Than One Hundred Men Have Recovered from Alcoholism in 1939, giving it his approval. Members of Alcoholics Anonymous (AA) point to this review as significant in the development of the AA movement.

Fosdick was an active member of the American Friends of the Middle East, a founder of the Committee for Justice and Peace in the Holy Land, and an active "anti-Zionist".

He was a major influence on Martin Luther King Jr. who said that Fosdick was "the greatest preacher of this century." King drew on Fosdick's writings and sermons for some of his own sermons.

== Works ==
- The Second Mile (1908)
- The Assurance of Immortality (1913)
- The Manhood of the Master (1913)
- The Meaning of Prayer (1915)
- The Meaning of Faith (1917)
- The Challenge of the Present Crisis (1918)
- The Meaning of Service (1920)
- Shall the Fundamentalists Win? (1921) (Reprinted by CrossReach Publications, 2015)
- Christianity and Progress (1922)
- Evolution and Mr. Bryan (1922)
- Twelve Tests of Character (1923)
- Science and Religion. Evolution and the Bible (1924)
- The Modern Use of the Bible (1924)
- Adventurous Religion, and Other Essays (1926)
- A Pilgrimage to Palestine (1927)
- What Religion Means to Me (1929)
- As I See Religion (1932)
- The Hope of the World; Twenty-Five Sermons on Christianity Today (1933)
- The Secret of Victorious Living (1934)
- The Power to See it Through (1935)
- Successful Christian Living (1937)
- A Guide to Understanding the Bible: The Development of Ideas Within the Old and New Testaments (1938)
- Living Under Tension; Sermons on Christianity Today (1941)
- On Being a Real Person (1943)
- A Great Time to be Alive; Sermons on Christianity in Wartime (1944)
- On Being Fit to Live With; Sermons on Post-War Christianity (1946)
- The Man from Nazareth, as His Contemporaries Saw Him (1949)
- The Meaning of Prayer (1950)
- Rufus Jones Speaks to Our Time; An Anthology (1951)
- Great Voices of the Reformation (1952)
- A Faith for Tough Times (1952)
- Sunday Evening Sermons; Fifteen Selected Addresses Delivered before the noted Chicago Sunday Evening Club with Alton Meyers Meyers (1952)
- What is Vital in Religion; Sermons on Contemporary Christian Problems (1955)
- Martin Luther (1956)
- The Living of These Days; An Autobiography (1956)
- A Book of Public Prayers (1959)
- Jesus of Nazareth (1959)
- Dear Mr. Brown (1961)
- The Life of Saint Paul (1962)
- The Meaning of Being a Christian (1964)
- The Secret of Victorious Living (1966)
- Harry Emerson Fosdick's Art of Preaching; An Anthology (1971)

Works with a contribution by Fosdick

- Seeing the Invisible by Harold Cooke (Introduction by Harry Emerson Fosdick) (1932)
- You and Yourself by Albert George Butzer (Introduction by Harry Emerson Fosdick) (1933)
- The Complete Sayings of Jesus; The King James Version of Christ's Own Words. by Arthur Hinds (Introduction by Harry Emerson Fosdick) (1942)
- A Rauschenbusch reader, the Kingdom of God and the social Gospel Fosdick contributed a chapter (1957)
- Riverside Sermons (1958)

== Extended family ==
Fosdick's brother, Raymond Fosdick, was essentially in charge of philanthropy for John D. Rockefeller Jr., running the Rockefeller Foundation for three decades, from 1921. Rockefeller funded the nationwide distribution of Shall the Fundamentalists Win?, although with a more cautious title, The New Knowledge and the Christian Faith. This direct-mail project was designed by Ivy Lee, who had worked since 1914 as an independent contractor in public relations for the Rockefellers.

Fosdick's daughter, Dorothy Fosdick, was foreign policy adviser to Henry M. ("Scoop") Jackson, a United States Senator from Washington state. She also authored a number of books.

He was the nephew of Charles Austin Fosdick, a popular author of adventure books for boys, who wrote under the pen name Harry Castlemon.

== See also ==
- List of covers of Time magazine (1920s)
