= Kermit Roosevelt III =

American writer and lawyer

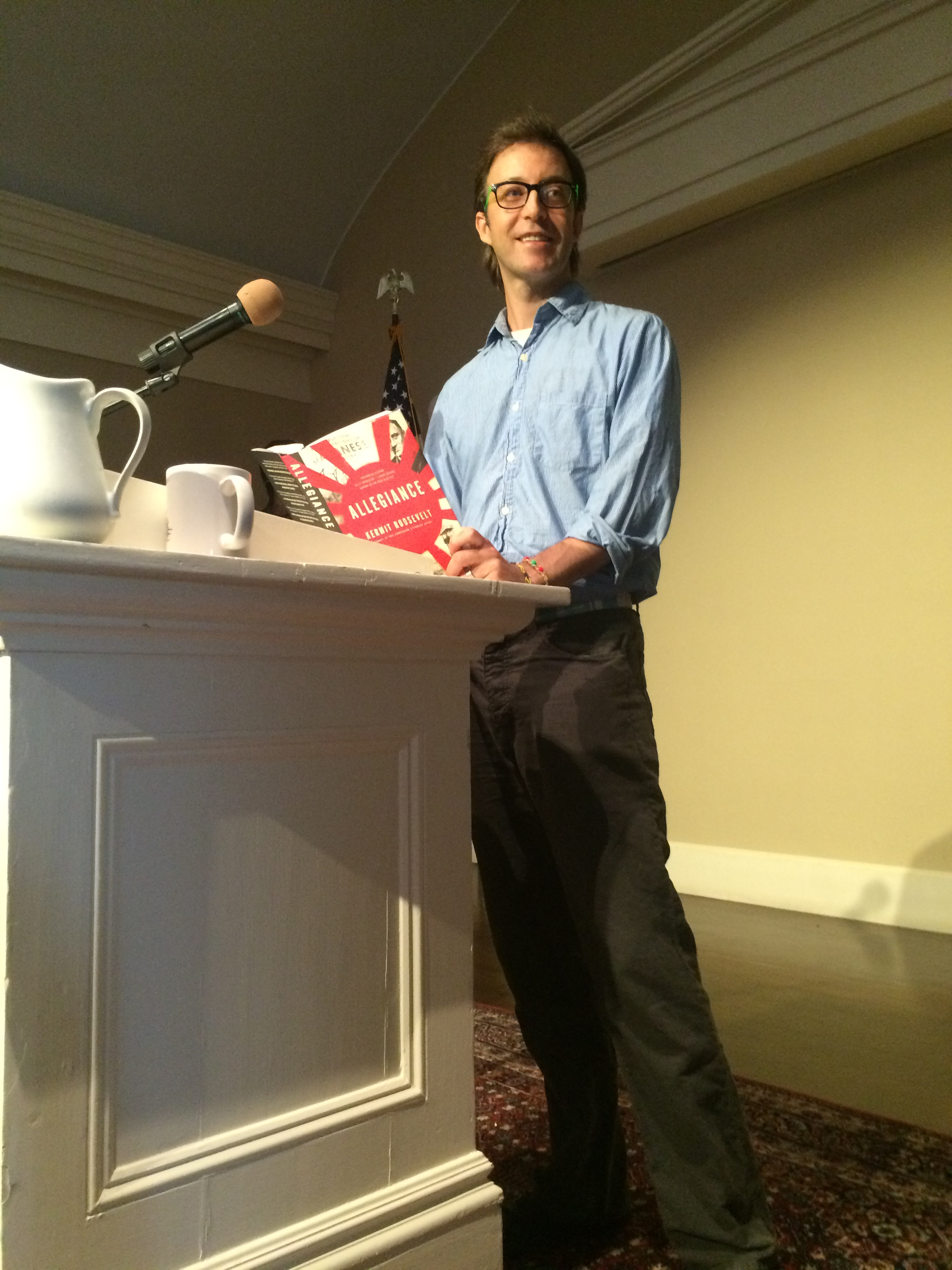
- Roosevelt reading at the Nantucket Atheneum (August 2015)
- Born: July 14, 1971 (age 55); Washington, D.C., U.S.
- Education: Harvard University (AB); Yale University (JD)
- Political party: Democratic
- Relatives: See Roosevelt family

Kermit Roosevelt III (born July 14, 1971) is an American author, lawyer, and David Berger Professor for the Administration of Justice at the University of Pennsylvania Law School. He was a law clerk for U.S. Supreme Court Justice David Souter in 1999–2000, and has specialized in his academic work in constitutional law and conflict of laws.

He is a great-great-grandson of U.S. President Theodore Roosevelt and a distant cousin of President Franklin D. Roosevelt.

== Early life and education ==
Roosevelt was born in Washington, D.C., on July 14, 1971. His father, also named Kermit, was a son of Kermit Roosevelt Jr. and a great-grandson of President Theodore Roosevelt. He graduated from St. Albans School (where he was a Presidential Scholar), Harvard University, and Yale Law School. He was a law clerk for Judge Stephen F. Williams of the D.C. Circuit, and then clerked for at the US Supreme Court for Justice David Souter.

== Career ==
Roosevelt worked as a lawyer with Mayer Brown in Chicago from 2000 to 2002 before joining the Penn Law faculty in 2002. He was an assistant professor, from 2002 to 2007, and Professor of Law (Conflict of Laws, Constitutional Law), from 2007 to 2021, when he was appointed as David Berger Professor for the Administration of Justice.

Roosevelt's areas of academic interest include conflicts of law and constitutional law. His articles have been cited twice by the United States Supreme Court and numerous times by state and lower federal courts. His scholarly publications include "Resolving Renvoi: the Bewitchment of Our Intelligence by Means of Language," University of Notre Dame Law Review (2005).

Roosevelt has also written two novels, both of which dramatize legal issues.

He gave a TEDx talk in June 2016 entitled "Myth America: The Declaration, the Constitution, and Us."

== Activities ==
In May 2016, Roosevelt and Karen Korematsu (daughter of a prominent American opponent of Japanese-American internment during World War 2) were featured speakers at a National Constitution Center program. It is the first time a member of the Roosevelt family and a member of the Korematsu family appeared in a public forum.

Roosevelt is a Distinguished Research Fellow of the Annenberg Public Policy Center at the University of Pennsylvania and a member of the American Law Institute. In November 2014, the American Law Institute announced that Roosevelt had been selected as the Reporter for the Third Restatement of Conflict of Laws.

== Novels ==
Roosevelt's first novel, In the Shadow of the Law, had generally positive reviews. It was a Christian Science Monitor Best Book of the Year. Alan Dershowitz, writing in The New York Times, said that the book "suffers from the showoffy-ness of an aspiring artiste" but recommended it "with real enthusiasm" because its critique of legal firms "rings true of all too many corporate law factories."

Roosevelt's second novel, Allegiance, published in 2015, was a Harper Lee Prize finalist. It received favorable reviews in The Wall Street Journal ("well worth reading") and The Richmond Times-Dispatch ("splendid, troubling, and authoritative") and a starred review from Publishers Weekly. The story examines U.S. national security policies during World War II, focusing on President Franklin D. Roosevelt's Executive Order 9066, which authorized the internment of Japanese Americans.

== Books ==
=== Nonfiction ===
- Kermit Roosevelt III (2006). The Myth of Judicial Activism: Making Sense of Supreme Court Decisions. Yale University Press. ISBN 0-300-11468-0.
- Kermit Roosevelt III (2010). Conflict of Laws. Foundation Press/Thomson Reuters. ISBN 978-1-59941-788-2.
- Kermit Roosevelt III (2022). The Nation That Never Was. University of Chicago Press. ISBN 978-0-226-81761-3. OCLC 1268257035.

=== Fiction ===
- Kermit Roosevelt III (2006). In the Shadow of the Law: A Novel. Farrar, Straus and Giroux. ISBN 978-1-4299-3149-6.
- Kermit Roosevelt III (2015). Allegiance: A Novel. Regan Arts. ISBN 978-1-941393-90-1.

== See also ==
- List of law clerks for the third seat of the Supreme Court of the United States
