= Palfrey (surname) =

Palfrey is an occupational surname, denoting a person responsible for the maintenance and provision of saddle horses. Notable people with the surname include:

- Daf Palfrey (born 1973), Welsh television, film and video director, producer and writer
- Deborah Jeane Palfrey (1956–2008), operated an escort agency in Washington, D.C., convicted in 2008 of racketeering, money laundering, etc.
- Francis Winthrop Palfrey (1831–1889), American historian, born in Boston, Massachusetts son of J. G. Palfrey
- John G. Palfrey (1796–1881), American clergyman and historian who served as a U.S. representative from Massachusetts
- John Palfrey (born 1972), faculty co-director of the Berkman Center for Internet & Society at Harvard Law School
- Judith Palfrey (born 1943), the T. Berry Brazelton Professor of Pediatrics at Harvard Medical School
- Lisa Palfrey, Welsh television actress best known for playing the character of Rhiannedd Frost in the Welsh soap Pobol y Cwm
- Mianne Palfrey, American tennis player
- Polly Palfrey Woodrow (1906–1997), American tennis player
- Quentin Palfrey (born 1974), American lawyer
- Sarah Palfrey Cooke (1912–1996), female tennis player from the United States
- Sean Palfrey (born 1968), Welsh professional darts player who currently plays in the Professional Darts Corporation
- Simon Palfrey, English Scholar at Oxford University and a Fellow in English at Brasenose College, Oxford University
- Stephen Palfrey Webb (1804–1879), 3rd & 12th mayor of Salem, Massachusetts (1842–1845, 1860–1862) and 6th mayor of San Francisco (1854–1855)
- Thomas Palfrey (born 1953), currently (as of 2007) the Flintridge Professor of Economics and Political Science at the California Institute of Technology
- William Palfrey (1741–1780), American Patriot born in Boston, Massachusetts
- Yolande Palfrey (1957–2011), British actress

== See also ==
- Mr. Palfrey of Westminster, British television drama which ran in 1984–85
- Mrs. Palfrey at the Claremont, 2005 comedy-drama film made by Claremont Films
