= Hooper House =

Hooper House may refer to:

- Hooper House (Baltimore County, Maryland), historic house in the Bauhaus style by architect Marcel Breuer
- James E. Hooper House, Baltimore, Maryland, listed on the NRHP
- Hooper House (Swansea, Massachusetts), historic house
- Bevard House, also known as Hooper House in Bradshaw, Maryland

== See also ==
- Hooper-Eliot House, Cambridge, Massachusetts, listed on the NRHP in Massachusetts
- Hooper–Lee–Nichols House, Cambridge, Massachusetts, listed on the NRHP in Massachusetts
- Robert "King" Hooper Mansion, Marblehead, Massachusetts, listed on the NRHP in Massachusetts
- Hooper–Bowler–Hillstrom House, Belle Plaine, Minnesota, listed on the NRHP in Minnesota
- Nash-Hooper House, Hillsborough, North Carolina, listed on the NRHP in North Carolina
- Dr. D. D. Hooper House, Sylva, North Carolina, listed on the National Register of Historic Places in Jackson County, North Carolina
- Jessie Jack Hooper House, Oshkosh, Wisconsin, listed on the National Register of Historic Places in Winnebago County, Wisconsin
