= Scannebago =

The Scannebago concept can be attributed to Emily Gore, currently the Director for Content for the Digital Public Library of America. The premise behind the "Scannebago" is to work with donors and other funders to create a group of mobile scan centers that would enable the digitization of collections from small, local cultural heritage institutions that may not otherwise have access to these services.

== Origin ==
The idea was conceived during Gore's time as Project Manager for NC ECHO, the former statewide digitization collaborative in North Carolina. To travel the state of North Carolina, "from Murphy to Manteo," takes 9 hours, and North Carolina's terrain varies greatly from the mountains to the sea. The NC ECHO staff found during a multi-year survey of cultural heritage institutions that many of these institutions did not trust their valuable materials to be digitized by others outside of the cultural heritage agency's watchful eye. As a result, the Scannebago was conceptualized to meet the needs of these agencies. Gore's dream for the concept is to see it realized, potentially as part of a national initiative. She has shared her vision widely in hopes of this dream becoming a reality.

Gore envisioned potentially working with Winnebago Industries to develop these mobile scanning units that would be able to house scanning equipment capable of digitizing materials found in multiple formats, satellite connections for upload and an affordable, comfortable place for staff to sleep while on the road.

== Potential implementation ==
The Scannebago concept and project were recently included as an exemplar concept in John Palfrey's "What is the DPLA" video about visions for the Digital Public Library of America. Per Palfrey, the Digital Public Library of America project will "incorporate all media types and formats but will likely concentrate initially on the written record—books, pamphlets, periodicals, manuscripts, and digital texts—expanding into audio-visual materials in concert with existing repositories." Additional content will be added to DPLA over time, allowing institutions to help build and grow the larger DPLA while being able to use tools and services of the DPLA to "facilitate both the digitization and presentation of digital content and broad public access to this content." In this discussion, Palfrey argued that "you could create a DPLA for a town or for a historic society. You could imagine it also taking the form of mobile scanning operations. So you could imagine a project I like the name of—the Scannebago—...driving Winnebagoes across certain areas, going to historical societies, going to local libraries and helping people to scan materials that might be of local interest; having them fold up into the DPLA but also be curated locally as part of a local collection that otherwise might not get put into a digital collection." The idea might involve library students, active librarians, and retired librarians, as well as those who work in other cultural heritage institutions, driving the Scannebago around the country.
