= Lawrence Chamberlain =

Lawrence Chamberlain may refer to:

- Joshua Chamberlain, born Lawrence Joshua Chamberlain, American college professor, politician and Union Army general
- Lawrence Henry Chamberlain, American political scientist and academic administrator
