= John Gorham Palfrey (academic) =

American law professor, 1919–1979

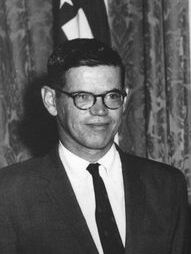
- Palfrey in 1962

Dean of Columbia College
- In office 1958–1962
- Preceded by: Lawrence H. Chamberlain
- Succeeded by: David B. Truman

Personal details
- Born: March 12, 1919 Beacon Hill, Boston, U.S.
- Died: October 28, 1979 (aged 60) Boston, Massachusetts, U.S.
- Spouse: Clochette Roosevelt
- Relations: John G. Palfrey (great-grandfather); Francis Winthrop Palfrey (grandfather); Kermit Roosevelt (father-in-law); Sarah Palfrey Cooke (sister); Mianne Palfrey (sister); Polly Palfrey Woodrow (sister); Judith Palfrey (daughter-in-law); John Palfrey (grandson); Quentin Palfrey (grandson)
- Education: Harvard University (BA, JD)

John Gorham Palfrey Jr. (March 12, 1919 – October 28, 1979) was an American academic, administrator, and government official. He was a professor at law at Columbia University and served as dean of Columbia College from 1958 to 1962. He also served on the United States Atomic Energy Commission from 1962 to 1966.

== Early life ==
Palfrey was born in Beacon Hill, Boston on March 12, 1919. He was a son of Methyl Gertrude (née Oakes) Palfrey and John Gorham Palfrey Sr., a prominent Boston attorney. John and his sisters were avid tennis players, with all five of his sisters winning a national junior title, including Sarah Palfrey Cooke, who won two singles, nine women's doubles, and four mixed doubles titles at the U.S. National Championships.

He was a great-grandson of John G. Palfrey, a Massachusetts Congressman and the first dean of Harvard Divinity School. His grandfather, Francis Winthrop Palfrey, was an American historian and Civil War officer. His family is descended from William Palfrey, who served in the American Revolutionary War as aide-de-camp to George Washington.

Palfrey graduated from Milton Academy and Harvard College in 1940, where he was classmates with John F. Kennedy. He also studied at Harvard Law School before his studies were interrupted by World War II, during which he served in the Army Signal Corps and with the military intelligence at The Pentagon, retiring as a first lieutenant.

== Career ==
After law school, he served on the staff of the Atomic Energy Commission's general counsel for three years and spent two years at the Institute for Advanced Study in Princeton, New Jersey.

Palfrey joined the Columbia faculty in 1952, becoming a full professor in 1956. He was appointed dean of the undergraduate liberal arts college before being appointed by President Kennedy to serve on the Atomic Energy Commission, and remained in that position under President Lyndon B. Johnson.

After concluding his term at the commission, Palfrey served as a fellow at the Harvard Institute of Politics, Woodrow Wilson International Center for Scholars, and the Brookings Institution.

== Personal life ==
In December 1942, Palfrey married Belle Wyatt "Clochette" Roosevelt (1919–1985) in Fairfax, Virginia. She was a granddaughter of President Theodore Roosevelt and a daughter of Kermit Roosevelt. Their wedding was attended by Franklin D. Roosevelt and Eleanor Roosevelt. Together, they were the parents of:

- John "Sean" Gorham Palfrey III, who married Judith Swann Sullivan, both whom were professors of medicine at Boston University School of Medicine and Harvard Medical School, respectively.
- Antonia "Tonia" Ford Palfrey (1954–2022), a poet, photographer and painter who was named for her ancestress Antonia Ford. She was engaged to photographer Richard Allan Perrini in 1982.

He died on October 28, 1979, at age 60 in Boston.

=== Descendants ===
His grandson, John Palfrey, served on the faculty of Harvard Law School and was the head of school of Phillips Academy. He is currently the President of the MacArthur Foundation. Another grandson, Quentin Palfrey, currently serves as Deputy General Counsel at the United States Department of Commerce and was a Democratic candidate in the 2018 Massachusetts election for lieutenant governor.

Academic offices
Preceded by Lawrence Henry Chamberlain	Dean of Columbia College; 1950–1958	Succeeded by David B. Truman
