= Palfrey (disambiguation) =

Palfrey was a light riding horse common in the Middle Ages.

Palfrey may also refer to:

- Palfrey (surname), people with the surname Palfrey
- Palfrey, West Midlands, a locality in the town of Walsall
- Palfrey Island, part of the Lizard Island Group 270 km north of Cairns, Queensland, Australia

== See also ==
- Mr. Palfrey of Westminster, 1980s British television series
