= Francis Winthrop Palfrey =

American Civil War officer (1831–1889)

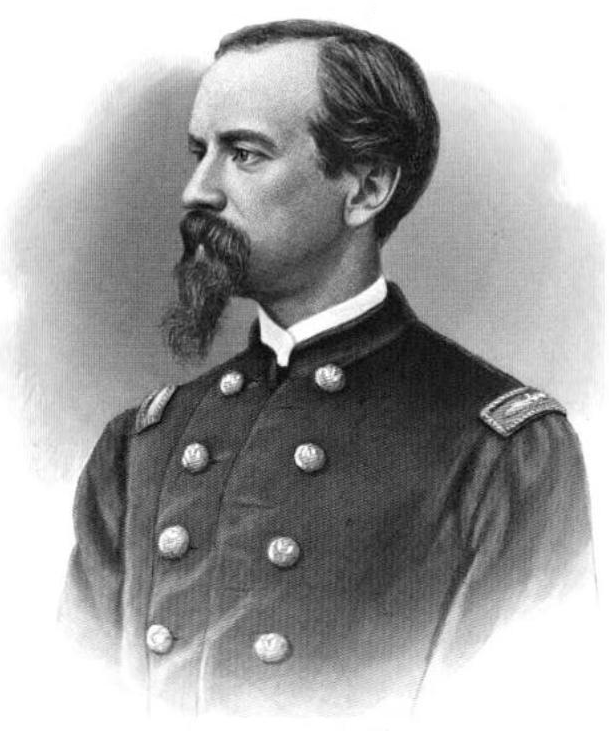
- Born: April 11, 1831; Boston, Massachusetts, U.S.
- Died: December 5, 1889 (aged 58); Cannes, France
- Education: Harvard University; Harvard Law School
- Occupations: Historian, military officer
- Spouse: Louisa Caroline Bartlett (m. 1865)
- Children: 3

Signature
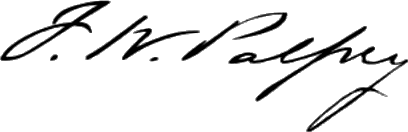

Francis Winthrop Palfrey (1831–1889) was an American historian and Civil War officer.

== Early life ==
Palfrey was born in Boston, Massachusetts on April 11, 1831, the son of John G. Palfrey (1796–1881) and Mary Ann (née Hammond) Palfrey (1800–1897). His father was a Harvard graduate (1815) who served in the Massachusetts State House of Representatives, as a United States Congressman from Massachusetts, and postmaster of Boston. He was also an unsuccessful Free Soil Party candidate for Governor of Massachusetts in 1851.

He graduated at Harvard in 1851 and at the Law School two years afterward. His great-grandfather was William Palfrey.

== Civil War ==
Initially, Palfrey was a first lieutenant in the 4th Battalion of the Massachusetts Militia. Not long after, he was made a lieutenant colonel in the 20th Massachusetts Volunteer Infantry, known as the "Harvard Unit" due to the number of graduates in this group. He would serve under William Raymond Lee, and alongside Henry Livermore Abbott, Oliver Wendell Holmes Jr., and Paul Joseph Revere. He was severely injured at the Battle of Antietam. Following Lee's discharge in December 1862, Palfrey was promoted to Colonel of the unit, a rank he would hold until his own discharge in April 1863 due to lingering health effects.

He married Louisa Caroline Bartlett on March 29, 1865, and they had three daughters.

On May 4, 1866, President Andrew Johnson nominated Palfrey for the award of the honorary grade of brevet brigadier general, to rank from March 13, 1865, for gallant and meritorious services during the war, The U.S. Senate confirmed the award on May 18, 1866. In 1872 he was appointed register in bankruptcy. He published A Memoir of William F. Bartlett (1879); Antietam and Fredericksburg, in the "Campaigns of the Civil War Series" (1882); and contributed to the first volume of Military Papers of the Historical Society of Massachusetts and to the North American Review.

== Other family ==
Palfrey's younger brother, John Carver Palfrey, was an 1857 graduate of the United States Military Academy and also served in the Civil War, eventually reaching the rank of Brevet Brigadier General. John's grandson, John Gorham Palfrey III, married Belle Wyatt Roosevelt, daughter of Kermit Roosevelt, sister of Kermit Roosevelt, Jr., aunt of Mark Roosevelt, great-aunt of Kermit Roosevelt III, granddaughter of 26th President of the United States Theodore Roosevelt, 1st cousin once removed of First Lady Eleanor Roosevelt, and distant cousin of 32nd President of the United States Franklin D. Roosevelt. Palfrey and Roosevelt had a son, Sean, who is married to Judith Palfrey. They have two sons: John Palfrey and Quentin Palfrey, who was a candidate for Massachusetts Lieutenant Governor in 2018.

Francis Winthrop Palfrey died in Cannes, France on December 5, 1889.

== See also ==
- List of American Civil War brevet generals (Union)
- List of Massachusetts generals in the American Civil War
- Massachusetts in the American Civil War
