= DLPA =

DLPA may refer to:

- DL-Phenylalanine, a nutritional supplement used for its purported analgesic and antidepressant properties.
- Digital Public Library of America, an online digital library providing free public access to digitized materials from libraries, archives, and museums across the United States.
