= IPL2 =

IPL2 or ipl2 may refer to:

- 2009 Indian Premier League, the second season of the Indian Premier League
- IGN Pro League season 2
- Internet Public Library, following its merger with the Librarians' Internet Index
