= Bevard =

Bevard is a surname. Notable people with the surname include:

- Herbert Bevard (born 1946), American bishop
- Samuel S. Bevard (died 1940), American politician

== See also ==
- Bevard House
