= Fanny Curtis =

American tennis player

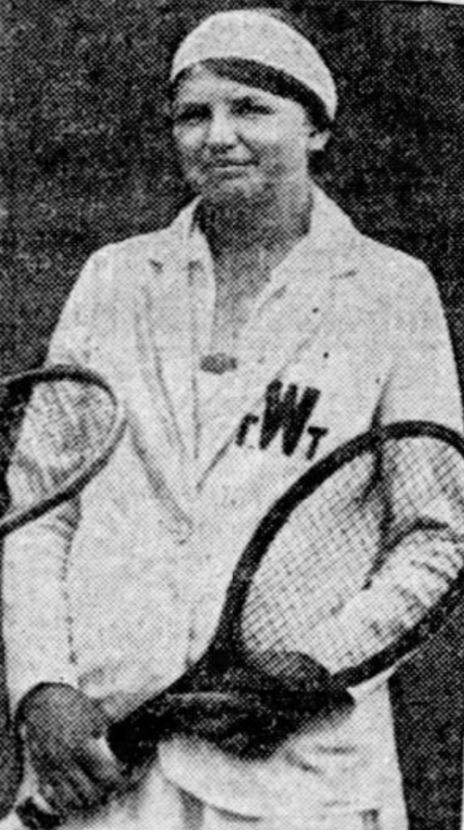
- Fanny Curtis, from a 1925 newspaper
- Born: Fanny Chapin Curtis; January 11, 1908; New York, New York, U.S.
- Died: May 1, 2003 (aged 95); San Juan Island, Washington, U.S.
- Other name: Fanny C. Ham
- Occupation: Sportswoman
- Relatives: Greely S. Curtis (grandfather); Edward W. Hooper (grandfather); Margaret Curtis (aunt); Harriot Curtis (aunt)

Fanny Chapin Curtis Ham (January 11, 1908 – May 1, 2003) was an American sportswoman from Boston. She won the national Junior Doubles tennis championship in 1924 and 1925. with Polly Palfrey and Lee Palfrey as her partners. She also competed in field hockey and badminton tournaments.

== Early life and education ==
Curtis was born in New York City, the daughter of Greely Stevenson Curtis and Fanny Hooper Curtis. She was raised in a socially prominent family in Brookline and Marblehead, Massachusetts. Her paternal grandfather Greely S. Curtis was a Union Army brigadier general during the American Civil War. Her maternal grandfather Edward William Hooper was treasurer at Harvard University. Her aunts Margaret Curtis and Harriot Curtis were both athletes, with national championships in women's golf, tennis, and skiing. Her birth was mentioned in a personal letter from Henry James to her aunt, his sister-in-law, Louisa Hooper.

Curtis graduated from Smith College in 1930.

== Career ==
Curtis won the national Junior Doubles championship in 1924, with Polly Palfrey as her partner. The pair also won the Massachusetts state Junior Doubles championship that year, and Curtis won the Massachusetts Junior singles title as well. In 1925, she won a singles tournament in Massachusetts, and won the Junior Singles and Junior Doubles championships, with Palfrey's sister, Lee, as her doubles partner. In 1927, she competed in a women's tennis tournament at the Montserrat Club in Beverly. She played at the college level in 1929, in both singles and doubles games, again with Polly Palfrey as her partner. In 1930, she and Polly Paltrey lost in the second round of doubles at the annual Essex County women's invitational tennis tournament. Also in 1930, she competed in tennis singles at a tournament in Swampscott.

Curtis played left fullback on an All-Boston field hockey team in 1929. She won a badminton tournament of the Women's Interclub Bandminton League in 1933, and was seeded second as a singles and doubles player at a New England badminton tournament in 1935.

Curtis worked with journalist Edward R. Murrow in New York as a young woman. Later in life, Ham was active in the League of Women Voters (LWV) in Brookline and in Hanover, New Hampshire. While living in Cleveland, she co-chaired a 1959 LWV study on post-secondary education, and was a trustee of Cuyahoga Community College from 1962 to 1972. She co-chaired another LWV study in 1974, on recreational opportunities in Hanover.

== Personal life ==
Curtis married physician and medical researcher Thomas Hale Ham in 1936; Polly Palfrey was one of her attendants at the wedding. They had a son, Thomas, and daughters Margaret (Polly) and Josephine. Her son died in 1963, and her husband died in 1987. She died in 2003, at the age of 95, on San Juan Island in Washington State.
