= Pelfrey =

Pelfrey is a surname. Notable people with the surname include:

- Doug Pelfrey (born 1970), American football player
- Mike Pelfrey (born 1984), American baseball player and coach
- Ray Pelfrey (1928–2017), American football player

== See also ==
- Palfrey (surname)
