= Polly Palfrey Woodrow =

American tennis player

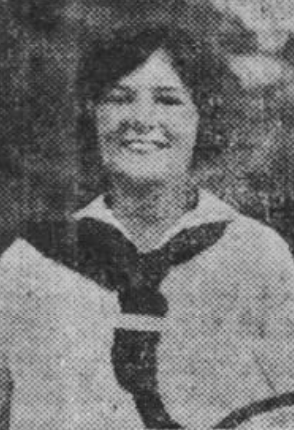
- Polly Palfrey (later Woodrow), from a 1924 newspaper
- Born: Margaret Germaine Palfrey; October 7, 1906; Boston, Massachusetts, U.S.
- Died: August 26, 1997 (aged 90); Santa Clara, California, U.S.
- Occupation: Tennis player
- Spouse: Charles A. Woodrow (m. 1936; died 1981)
- Children: 1
- Relatives: Sarah Palfrey Cooke (sister); Mianne Palfrey (sister); John Palfrey (brother); Jerome Alan Danzig (brother-in-law); Francis Winthrop Palfrey (grandfather); John G. Palfrey (great-grandfather)

Margaret Germaine "Polly" Palfrey Woodrow (née Palfrey; October 7, 1906 – August 26, 1997) was an American tennis player from Boston, active in the 1920s and 1930s.

Palfrey won the Massachusetts and national Junior Doubles championships in 1924, with Fanny Curtis as her partner.

== Early life and education ==
Palfrey was born in Boston, the eldest daughter of John Gorham Palfrey and Methyl Gertrude Oakes Paltrey. Her father was a lawyer. She graduated from Smith College in 1929. At Smith, she was president of the Student Government Association.

== Career ==
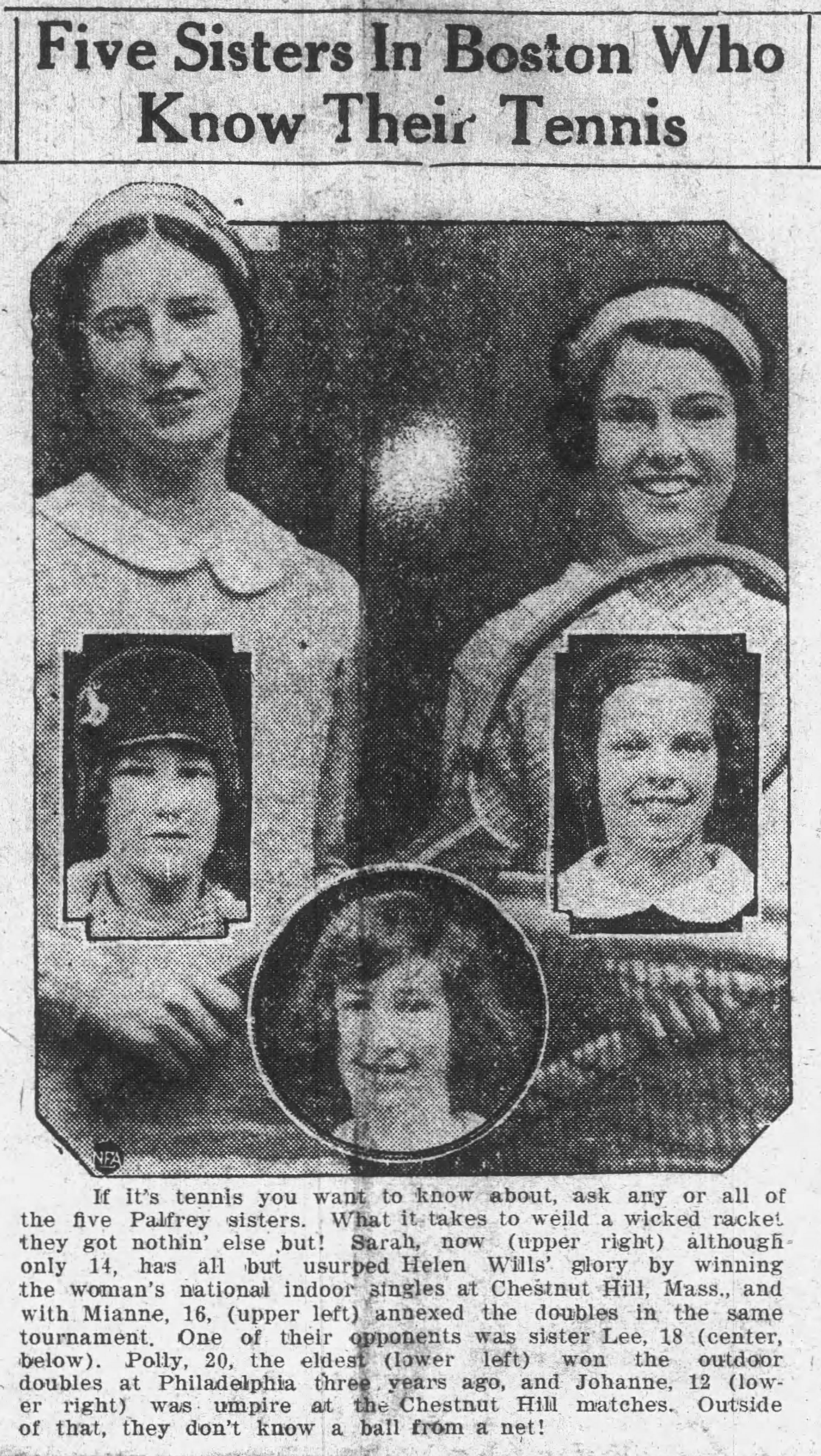
"Five Sisters in Boston Who Know Their Tennis" The Messenger (April 6, 1927); a newspaper feature about Palfrey and her sisters

Palfrey and her siblings, including John Palfrey, Sarah Palfrey Cooke and Mianne Palfrey, all competed in tennis at the national level. Polly Palfrey won the Massachusetts and national Junior Doubles championships in 1924, with Fanny Curtis as her partner. She also played doubles with younger sister Elizabeth, also known as Lee, as her partner. In 1929, she played in both singles and doubles games at a tournament in Cohasset, and in a college tournament in 1929, partnered with Curtis again. She played in doubles and mixed doubles games at a tournament in Swampscott in 1930, and as a singles player at a 1931 tournament in Chestnut Hill. She was seeded second at a 1935 tournament at Longwood Country Club, but lost in the second round. In 1940, in her thirties, she lost to Helen Jacobs at Germantown Cricket Club near Philadelphia.

Palfrey was also an avid golfer, and she was president of the Schenectady Junior League in the 1940s. She taught English at Bryn Mawr College and at Skidmore College.

== Publications ==
- "Read to Me" (The Atlantic, 1948)

== Personal life ==
Palfrey married civil engineer Charles A. Woodrow in 1936. They had a daughter, Joanna. Her husband died in 1981, and she died in 1997, at the age of 90, in Santa Clara, California.
