= Born Digital =

Born Digital: Understanding the First Generation of Digital Natives
- Author: John Palfrey and Urs Gasser
- Subject: Sociology
- Publisher: Basic Books
- Publication date: 2008, 2016
- Pages: 375
- ISBN: 978-0-465-00515-4
- OCLC: 176895002
- Dewey Decimal: 302.23/10835 22
- LC Class: HM851 .P34 2008

Born Digital: Understanding the First Generation of Digital Natives is a book by John Palfrey and Urs Gasser exploring the consequences of the wide availability of internet connectivity to the first generation of people born to it, whom Palfrey and Gasser refer to as "digital natives". Issues addressed include shifts in the concept of identity, privacy, content creation, activism, and music piracy.

Born Digital has been called "a landmark sociological study of today's early adults." Born Digital was also reviewed in Science and The Washington Post. Library Journal named Born Digital one of its top Science and Technology books for 2008, the only computer science book named to the prestigious list. Two reviews in the British press (The Guardian and The Independent) have also compared the book with Nicholas Carr's The Shallows.

The book has been criticized for its use of the term "digital natives," among other things.

The book was re-issued by Basic Books in a revised and expanded version in 2016, with a new subtitle. The 2016 edition was entitled Born Digital: How Children Grow up In a Digital Age. A review by Bill Shribman for the "Geek Dad" blog in 2016 said of the new edition: "The new edition brings us up to speed on everything from Snapchat to Black Lives Matter. It’s a great primer for any parent who wants a thoughtful look at just what lies ahead for any kid with a smartphone in their back pocket."

== See also ==
- Born-digital
- Digital native
- Born Digital book presentation at Google D.C. office
