= Hooper House (Swansea, Massachusetts) =

Historic house in Massachusetts, United States

- U.S. National Register of Historic Places
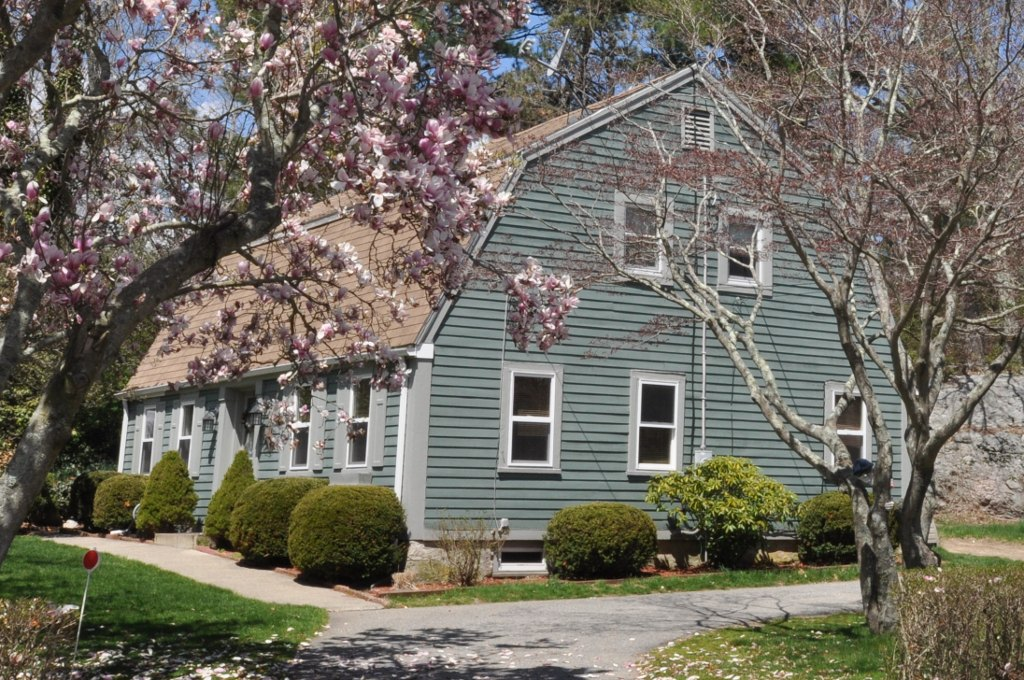

- Location within Massachusetts Location within the United States
- Location: 306 Hortonville Rd., Swansea, Massachusetts
- Coordinates: 41°45′30″N 71°11′49″W
- Area: 2 acres (0.81 ha)
- Built: c. 1790
- Architectural style: Federal
- MPS: Swansea MRA
- NRHP reference No.: 90000074
- Added to NRHP: August 8, 1990

The Hooper House is a historic house located in Swansea, Massachusetts.

== Description and history ==
The 1 1/2-story, gambrel-roofed, wood-framed house was built in about 1790, and is located on what was once a major route from the Gardner's Neck area to Rehoboth. It is a well-preserved example of a 19th-century farmhouse. The main facade is five bays wide, with a recessed center entrance flanked by sidelights and pilasters, and topped by an entablature. The property includes an early two-car garage (c. 1920s), an 1890 barn, and a stone wellhouse (c. 1920).

The house was listed on the National Register of Historic Places on August 8, 1990.

== See also ==
- National Register of Historic Places listings in Bristol County, Massachusetts
