= Digital Public Library of America =

US digital library project

- Abbreviation: DPLA
- Founded: April 18, 2013
- Type: Nonprofit
- Tax ID no.: 46-1160948
- Legal status: 501(c)(3) project
- Headquarters: Boston, Massachusetts, U.S.
- Executive director: John Bracken
- Website: dp.la

The Digital Public Library of America (DPLA) is a US project aimed at providing public access to digital holdings in order to create a large-scale public digital library. It officially launched on April 18, 2013, after two-and-a-half years of development.

== Overview ==
The DPLA is a discovery tool, or union catalog, for public domain and openly licensed content held by the United States' archives, libraries, museums, and other cultural heritage institutions. It was started by Harvard University's Berkman Center for Internet & Society in 2010, with financial support from the Alfred P. Sloan Foundation, and has subsequently received funding from several foundations and government agencies, including the National Endowment for the Humanities and the Bill & Melinda Gates Foundation.

DPLA "aims to unify such disparate sources as the Library of Congress, the Internet Archive, various academic collections, and presumably any other collection that would be meaningful to include. ... They have yet to ... decide such issues as how near to the present their catalog will come. There is an ongoing dispute regarding so-called 'orphan works' and other questions of copyright." John Palfrey, co-director of the Berkman Center, stated in 2011: "We aspire to establish a system whereby all Americans can gain access to information and knowledge in digital formats in a manner that is 'free to all.' It is by no means a plan to replace libraries, but rather to create a common resource for libraries and patrons of all types.”

The DPLA links service hubs, including twelve major state and regional digital libraries or library collaborations, as well as sixteen content hubs that maintain a one-to-one relationship with DPLA.

=== The Banned Book Club ===
In July 2023, in response to the considerable number of books banned or challenged in the United States, the DPLA launched The Banned Book Club. The online resource allows readers to check out books banned by local libraries. The service uses GPS to determine a user's location and allows them to freely access the exact books that have been banned in their local area. In May 2024, The Banned Book Club started a new social media campaign called, The Banned Book of the Week, where their curation team will select a new title every week to post on various social media applications. John S. Bracken, the executive director of the DPLA, said they created The Banned Book Club to ensure every American has access to books they want to read: "Today book bans are one of the greatest threats to our freedom".

== Board of directors ==
In September 2012, an inaugural Board of Directors was appointed to guide the DPLA: Cathy Casserly, CEO of Creative Commons; Paul Courant, Dean of Libraries and Professor of Information at the University of Michigan; Laura DeBonis, Former Director of Library Partnerships for Google Book Search; Luis Herrera, City Librarian for San Francisco; and John Palfrey, Head of School at Phillips Academy Andover, who served as board chairman. In 2015, Palfrey was succeeded as chairman by Amy Ryan of the Boston Public Library and Jennifer 8. Lee became a board member.

Daniel J. Cohen was appointed as the founding executive director in March 2013.

== History ==
=== 2012 Project Steering Committee ===
A steering committee led the planning phase of the DPLA initiative from inception through its launch in 2013. Members of the project's Steering Committee included Harvard University's Robert Darnton, Maura Marx, and John Palfrey; Paul Courant of University of Michigan, Carla Hayden then of Baltimore's Enoch Pratt Free Library and subsequently the Librarian of Congress, Charles J. Henry of the US Council on Library and Information Resources, Luis Herrera of San Francisco Public Library, Susan Hildreth of the US government Institute of Museum and Library Services (who stepped down from the Steering Committee to avoid a conflict of interest related to funding from IMLS), Brewster Kahle, Michael A. Keller of Stanford University, Carl Malamud, consultant Deanna B. Marcum, Jerome McGann, Dwight McInvaill of Georgetown County Library in South Carolina, Peggy Rudd of the Texas State Library and Archives Commission, Amy Ryan of the Boston Public Library, David Spadafora of the Newberry Library in Chicago, and Doron Weber of the Sloan Foundation. Others working on the project included Harvard University's David Weinberger.

=== Critiques ===
Critiques of the project during its planning phase included its vagueness, lack of internal cohesion, potentially redundant overlap with similar efforts (such as Project Gutenberg), and potential to redirect financial support away from existing public libraries. It has been suggested that in contrast to the brick-and-mortar public library, a digital public library may not be suitable for providing adult literacy training or fostering young children's cognitive development.

Concern that the project would harm funding for traditional public libraries was acknowledged in the statement of Peggy Rudd, a member of the Steering Committee, that "the Chief Officers of State Library Agencies passed a resolution at their May 11, 2011 meeting asking the steering committee to reconsider the name Digital Public Library of America, fearing that the inclusion of the word 'public' would have the unintended consequence of giving local governments the excuse to reduce public library funding".

=== Projects discussed in planning phase ===
Participants in the planning phase of the DPLA established a publicly accessible wiki which outlines "workstreams" ("Audience and Participation", "Content and Scope", "Financial/Business Models", "Governance", "Legal Issues," "Technical Aspects") and corresponding listserves. A proposed future project of the DPLA is the idea of the Scannebago, a mobile scanning unit that would travel the United States in order to digitize and curate local historical materials. Harvard University staff, led by project's managing director Maura Marx and principal investigator John Palfrey, coordinated a broad-based team that built the DPLA's digital library platform, which launched on April 18, 2013.

In June 2013, the DPLA announced a partnership with HathiTrust to provide access to the latter's digital materials.

== See also ==
- DigitalNZ
- Europeana
- Internet Public Library (1995–2015)
- Miami-Dade Public Library System Digital Collections
- Stanford Digital Library Project
- Trove, the Australian equivalent
- World Digital Library
- Digital public infrastructure
