= South Asian American Digital Archive =

- Location: Pennsylvania, United States of America
- Type: Digital Library
- Established: 2008

Collection
- Items collected: letters, photographs, newspapers, magazines, videos, websites, oral histories, etc.
- Size: over 5,200 items digitized

Access and use
- Access requirements: Open to anyone

Other information
- Budget: $1M+
- Director: Samip Mallick
- Employees: 6
- Funding: donations
- Website: www.saada.org

SAADA (South Asian American Digital Archive) is a 501(c)(3) not-for-profit organization that preserves and shares stories and materials associated with the history of South Asian Americans.

== History ==
SAADA was established in 2008 to preserve, document, and share the relatively unknown history of the South Asian American experience. SAADA is the only digital repository for materials related to the South Asian community in the United States. SAADA's digital-only approach to archives presents a major re-conceptualization of traditional archival functions. In this innovative, post-custodial approach to archives, original archival documents remain with the institutions or individuals from which they originate, while digital access copies are available online. In the summer of 2012, the archive added a visual browsing mode, allowing visitors to browse the archive without needing to choose any certain subject, source, time period, etc.

== Organizational structure ==
SAADA is a 501(c)3 recognized not-for-profit organization registered in Illinois and based in Philadelphia, Pennsylvania. Financial support is provided through individual donations with grant funding from the Mellon Foundation, Institute of Museum and Library Services, and National Endowment for the Humanities, among others. During the summer of 2012, SAADA launched a fundraising campaign entitled "Foundation for the Future". The campaign's purpose is to create a sustainable organization to raise awareness and preserve the historical and cultural stories of the South Asian American community.

== Collections ==
SAADA's Collection Development Policy defines South Asian American to include all those who trace their heritage to Bangladesh, India, Nepal, Pakistan, Sri Lanka, and the many South Asian diaspora communities across the globe. The archive collects digital files of materials in all formats that relate to the diverse history of South Asians in the United States, including written documents, newspapers, photographs, audio and video recordings, oral histories, pamphlets, websites, and digital files.

- Pre-1965 immigrants and visitors
- The Bellingham Riots
- South Asian American political involvement and activism
- Professional associations and labor organizations
- Regional and community organizations
- Religious organizations and places of worship
- Community newspapers
- Student organizations
- Prominent South Asian American artists, filmmakers, writers, musicians and intellectuals

Current SAADA collections include materials about Dalip Singh Saund, the first congressperson of Indian heritage, the Gadar Party, Fazlur Rahman Khan, Bhai Bhagwan Sing Gyanee and the Kerala Catholic Association of Southeast Michigan.

== Projects ==
From the archive, SAADA has launched several projects to promote visual art and oral histories within the South Asian American community.

- Where We Belong: Artists in the Archive is SAADA project supported by the Pew Center for Arts & Heritage. This project aims to organize a cohort of South Asian artists for a year long dialogue on how to use art and the archives to fight against symbolic erasure of immigrant and minority communities. The artists involved in the Where We Belong Project include Rudresh Mahanthappa, Chiraag Bhakta, Joti Singh, Chitra Ganesh, and Zain Alam.
- First Days Project is a SAADA project launched in 2013 that aims to collect and share stories of immigrants' first experiences in the United States. The website presents oral and written histories of immigrants' stories of what their first days were like in the United States. The First Days Project collects stories from all immigrant communities and currently has more than 600 stories in its collection.
- Tides is the SAADA's online magazine that publishes stories based on materials from the archive. The magazine intends to showcase the diversity of experiences in the South Asian American community.
- Our Stories: An Introduction to South Asian America is a book published by SAADA in 2021. The book is meant to serve as an introduction to South Asian American history with essays about South Asian American experience. The book is authored by scholars of South Asian American history in collaboration with artists, activists, and practitioners.
- Election Stories is a project presenting the evolution of South Asian American emotional impact between the 2016 and 2020 election, based on five open-ended questions and one binary question. Users can browse entries by submission or by question.

== Awards ==
- The First Days Project was awarded Roy Rosenzweig Prize Recipient by the American Historical Association in 2015.
- SAADA was awarded the Philip M. Hamer–Elizabeth Hamer Kegan Award by the Society of American Archivists in 2016.

== See also ==
- Densho
- Digital Library of India
- Nehru Memorial Museum & Library
- Panjab Digital Library
- Tamil Heritage Foundation
