= Internet Public Library =

US non-profit website, 1995–2015

- Revenue: Non-profit
- Website: ipl.org
- Launched: March 17, 1995; 31 years ago
- Current status: Defunct (as of June 30, 2015; 11 years ago)

The Virtual library (IPL, ipl2) was a non-profit, largely student-run website managed by a consortium, headed by Drexel University. Visitors could ask reference questions, and volunteer librarians and graduate students in library and information science formed collections and answered questions. The IPL opened on March 17, 1995. On January 1, 2010 it merged with the Librarians' Internet Index to become ipl2. It ceased operations completely on June 30, 2015.

The digital collections on the site were divided into five broad categories, and include Resources by Subject, Newspapers & Magazines, Special Collections Created By the ipl2, and Special Collections for Kids and Teens. As of March 2011 it had about 40,000 searchable resources. As of 2020 IPL has been purchased by Barnes and Noble Education and the above layout has been replaced; it now resembles an essay repository for students.

== History ==
The IPL originated at the University of Michigan’s School of Information. Michigan SI students almost exclusively generated its content. They also managed the Ask a Question reference service. In 2006 the University of Michigan opened up management of the IPL to other information science and library schools. They stopped hosting the IPL and moved the servers and staff positions to Drexel University, and by January 2007 the "IPL Consortium" that ran the IPL comprised a group of 15 colleges, including the University of Michigan. Drexel's College of Computing and Informatics hosted the site. With a grant from the Institute of Museum and Library Services, Drexel also used the site as a "'technological training center' for digital librarians."

In 2009 the Internet Public Library merged with the Librarians' Internet Index, a publicly funded website that until then was managed by the Califa Library group; the new web presence, which continued to be hosted by Drexel University, was dubbed "ipl2".

According to Joseph Janes of the University of Washington, ipl2 would no longer be supported as of the end of 2014. The last ipl2 monthly newsletter was February 2014. All operations officially ended on June 30, 2015.

As of January 2020 the site has reopened with a different design as well as changing its name from IPL2 to simply IPL. Barnes & Noble Education now owns IPL, although this is not obvious at first because it still operates as IPL and the contact email remains support@ipl.org. However, the 'Terms of use' page mentions that it is a subsidiary of BNED since at least November 2019. The tone of the site has changed considerably; it now appears to be an essay mill for high school and undergraduate students.

== Reviews ==
The Internet Public Library was generally highly regarded. It was noted for its "clean design" and depth of resources as well as its reference service that by 2011 had answered more than 100,000 queries.

== Elimination of site suggestions ==
IPL has been closed, with regard to website suggestions from outsiders, since 2010. At that time, the site had more than 21,000 suggestions, of which more than 85% were deemed inappropriate, based on the site's inclusion criteria.

== See also ==
- Digital Public Library of America
- Internet Archive
