= Edward W. Hooper =

Captain Edward W. Hooper
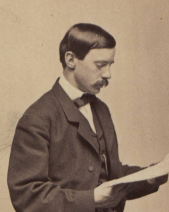
- Born: Edward William Hooper; December 14, 1839; Boston, Massachusetts, US
- Died: June 25, 1901 (aged 61); Belmont, Massachusetts, US
- Resting place: Mount Auburn Cemetery
- Education: Harvard College; Harvard Law School
- Occupations: Union Army; Treasurer, Harvard University
- Employer: Harvard
- Known for: Civil War military service; trustee of Boston's Museum of Fine Arts; manager of the Suffolk Savings Bank in Boston
- Spouse: Fanny Hudson Chapin (m. 1864; died 1881)
- Parents: Ellen Sturgis Hooper; Robert William Hooper
- Relatives: William Sturgis; (grandfather)
- Military career
- Allegiance: United States
- Branch: (United States) Union Army
- Service years: 1860s–1865
- Rank: Captain
- Units: Department of the East; Department of the South

Captain Edward William Hooper (December 14, 1839 – June 25, 1901), known as E. W. Hooper and also colloquially as Ned, was aide-de-camp on the staff of Union Generals Rufus Saxton, Department of the South and John Adams Dix, Department of the East during the American Civil War from 1862 to 1865. Hooper also served as private secretary to General Saxton, during which time he was given the rank of captain. He was also post commander and military governor in the South Carolina Sea Islands. Subsequently, he became steward (from 1872 to 1874) and later treasurer (from 1876 to 1898) of Harvard College.

== Life and family ==
Edward William Hooper was the son of Ellen Sturgis (1812–1848) and Robert W. Hooper (1810–1885) and the grandson of William Sturgis. His siblings were Marian "Clover" Hooper Adams (September 13, 1843 – December 6, 1885) an American socialite, active society hostess and arbiter of Washington, D.C., and accomplished amateur photographer and Ellen Sturgis "Nella" Hooper (1838–1887), who married professor Ephraim Whitman Gurney (1829–1886). The Hooper family was wealthy and prominent. Hooper's birthplace and childhood home in Boston was at 114 Beacon Street, Beacon Hill. When he was nine years old, his mother, a Transcendentalist poet, died. Hooper attended Harvard College and after graduating in the class of 1859, he entered Harvard Law School and receiving the degree of LL.B. in 1861. Hooper married Fanny Hudson Chapin (1844–1881) on July 6, 1864; their daughter Ellen Sturgis Hooper (born 1872) married John Briggs Potter in 1908.

Early in the American Civil War he enlisted in the army, serving on the staffs of Generals Saxton and Dix. He was sent to Port Royal, South Carolina in March 1862 as part of a contingent of teachers & school administrators from the New England Freedmen's Aid Society, of which his father was vice-president. He served on the staff of Gen. Saxton in the Department of the South as a Captain from March 13, 1865. He later served on Gen. Dix's staff in the Department of the East in New York and was given a promotion to Brevet Major on Jan 15, 1866. After the war, Hooper returned to Boston opened an office and lived in Cambridge, Massachusetts, at the Hooper-Eliot House, a Stick style house built in 1872 for Hooper.

In 1872, he became steward of Harvard College, an office he held for two years. He was chosen as the treasurer of Harvard in 1876, and continued in that position until 1898. His administration of the financial affairs of the college was noted to be remarkable for its skill and success "...in spite of adverse conditions and troublous times." On his retirement from Harvard in 1899, he received the degree of LL.D. After his retirement, Hooper devoted his time to the care of large trust properties and was one of the original trustees of the Boston Museum of Fine Arts. He was also one of the managers of the Suffolk Savings Bank in Boston. He died of pneumonia at McLean Hospital in Belmont, Massachusetts, on June 25, 1901, after a short illness.

== Documentation ==
His papers, dated from 1862 to 1866, relating to military service in South Carolina and New York during the Civil War are in the collection of the Houghton Library at Harvard University. They consist of 2 boxes (1 linear ft.) of documents and were a gift of Mrs. John B. Potter in 1962. The papers primarily consist of financial reports, invoices, receipts, and other documents relating to Hooper's term of service. Some letters are included in the collection; among them are three from Edward L. Pierce to Salmon P. Chase, Secretary of the Treasury, concerning the Port Royal Experiment. Captain Hooper was serving on the staff of General Saxton during the Port Royal Experiment. A letter, dated February 23, 1863, from Captain Edward W. Hooper to Henry W. Foote is in the collection of the Louis Round Wilson Special Collections Library at the University of North Carolina at Chapel Hill.

When he testified before the American Freedmen's Inquiry Commission, Hooper said:

I came to this department without any knowledge of the negro character, prepared to meet a race of savages not only thirsting for 'the horrors of a servile insurrection,' but quite ready to tear me limb from limb unless I could succeed in making myself agreeable to them. I have since found them, as a very general rule, gentle and ready to obey reasonable orders—almost too gentle in many cases to stand up for their own rights.

— E.W. Hooper, Captain and Aide-de-Camp to General Saxton – Beaufort, South Carolina, January 6, 1863.
