= Quentin Palfrey =

American lawyer (born 1974)

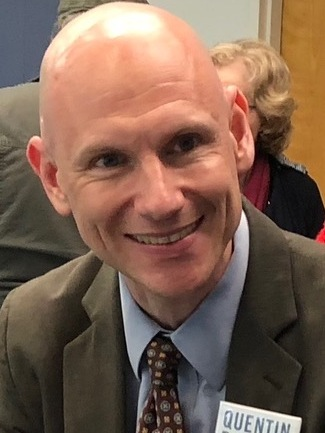
- Palfrey in 2018

Director of Federal Funds and Infrastructure of Massachusetts
- Incumbent
- Assumed office March 20, 2023
- Preceded by: Position established

Personal details
- Born: April 29, 1974 (age 52)
- Party: Democratic
- Relatives: Judith Palfrey (mother); John Palfrey (brother); John Gorham Palfrey (grandfather)
- Education: Harvard University (BA, JD)
- Website: quentinpalfrey.com

Quentin Palfrey (born April 29, 1974) is an American lawyer, policymaker, and politician. He currently serves as Director of Federal Funds and Infrastructure in the Massachusetts Executive Office for Administration and Finance. He previously served as the Executive Director of the Abdul Latif Jameel Poverty Action Lab (J-PAL) and is the Co-Director of the Global Access in Action project at the Berkman Klein Center for Internet & Society.

During President Obama’s first term, Palfrey worked as Senior Advisor for Jobs & Competitiveness in the White House Office of Science and Technology Policy. In that role, he served as lead policy staffer on reform efforts and also coordinated White House input into a report to Congress on the national strategy for innovation and competitiveness. He has written and spoken widely on innovation, poverty, and evidence-based policy.

Palfrey was the Democratic candidate in the 2018 Massachusetts election for lieutenant governor, running with gubernatorial candidate Jay Gonzalez against the incumbents, Governor Charlie Baker and Lieutenant Governor Karyn Polito of the Republican Party. The Baker/Polito ticket won the November general election by a margin of 1,781,341 votes to 885,770 cast for the Democrats.

== Early life and education ==
Palfrey grew up in Southborough, Massachusetts. His parents, Judith Palfrey (née Sullivan) and Sean Palfrey, are pediatricians who work in Boston. He has one brother, John Palfrey, who works as an educator, and one sister, Katy, who works in nonprofit conservation. Palfrey is the great-great-grandson of United States President Theodore Roosevelt.

Palfrey attended Phillips Exeter Academy, and graduated from Harvard College in 1996 and Harvard Law School in 2002.

== Career ==
After graduating from law school, Palfrey served as a law clerk for Judge Max Rosenn on the U.S. Court of Appeals for the Third Circuit. After a brief stint as a litigation associate at the New York office of Cravath, Swaine & Moore, Palfrey returned to Boston to serve as an Assistant Attorney General and later as the first Chief of the Health Care Division in the Office of the Massachusetts Attorney General. During Barack Obama's 2008 Presidential campaign, Palfrey served as the campaign's voter protection director in Ohio.

Palfrey also served as Deputy General Counsel for Strategic Initiatives at the U.S. Department of Commerce. As the first Chief of the Health Care Division in the Office of the Massachusetts Attorney General, Palfrey oversaw multi-million dollar consumer protection litigation and investigations relating to health insurance, pharmaceuticals, medical devices, healthcare providers and nursing homes. Prior to his Chief position, he was an Assistant Attorney General in the Insurance Division.

=== 2018 Massachusetts lieutenant gubernatorial campaign ===
In September 2017, Palfrey announced his campaign for Lieutenant Governor of Massachusetts, stating that "we need leaders who will fight for good jobs and fair pay, work to reduce inequality and poverty, and stand up against attacks on our diverse and inclusive American values." On June 2, 2018, Palfrey was endorsed at the Massachusetts State Democratic Convention. In the Democratic primary election held on September 4, 2018, Palfrey defeated Jimmy Tingle. Palfrey was defeated by Republican incumbent Karyn Polito in the general election held on November 6, 2018.

=== Biden administration ===
On January 21, 2021, Palfrey was sworn in by President Joe Biden to serve as Deputy General Counsel at the United States Department of Commerce. For some time, he served as acting general counsel while in this position.

=== 2022 Massachusetts attorney general campaign ===
Palfrey sought the Democratic nomination for Massachusetts Attorney General in 2022. He announced his candidacy in February 2022. In June 2022, he won the party's endorsement at its state convention. However, in August 2022, before the primary election, he withdrew his candidacy and endorsed Andrea Campbell.

=== Healey administration ===
On March 20, 2023, Massachusetts Governor Maura Healey and Lieutenant Governor Kim Driscoll announced that they had named Palfrey as Director of Federal Funds and Infrastructure in the Executive Office for Administration and Finance.

== Personal life ==
Palfrey married Anna Tabor in 2008. They have one daughter and two sons, including one named Andrew.

Palfrey's father was born John Gorham Palfrey, III, and is a 1967 graduate of Harvard, as is his mother, born Judith Swarm Sullivan. He had a younger brother who lived for less than a day (December 5, 1946) and a younger sister, Antonia Ford Palfrey.

Palfrey's 3rd great-grandfather is Massachusetts politician John G. Palfrey (1796-1881). His 2nd great-grandfather, John Carver Palfrey (1833-1906), served in the Civil War, as did his 3rd great-uncle, Francis Winthrop Palfrey (1831-1889). His great-grandfather, John Gorham Palfrey II (1875-1945) was an 1896 graduate of Harvard and a lawyer in Boston. His grandfather, John Gorham Palfrey, Jr. or the III (1919-1979), was a 1940 graduate of Harvard, served in World War II, was appointed to the Atomic Energy Commission by President John F. Kennedy, and was a professor at Columbia University from 1952 until his death in 1979 as well as dean of Columbia College from 1958 to 1962.

His grandmother was Belle Wyatt Roosevelt Palfrey (1919-1985), a daughter of Kermit Roosevelt, sister of Kermit Roosevelt Jr., sister of Joseph Willard Roosevelt, granddaughter of Theodore Roosevelt, first cousin, once removed of Eleanor Roosevelt, and fifth cousin, twice removed of Franklin D. Roosevelt. His 2nd great-grandfather was Joseph Edward Willard, lieutenant governor of Virginia and United States Ambassador to Spain.

Through his Roosevelt side, his first cousin, once removed is Mark Roosevelt; his second cousin is Kermit Roosevelt III; and his 2nd great-uncle was Quentin Roosevelt.

== Publications ==
- Expanding Access to Medications & Promoting Innovation: A Practical Approach, 24 Geo. J. on Poverty L. & Pol'y 161 (2017)
- State Judiciary’s Role in Fulfilling Brown’s Promise, 8 Mich. J. Race & Law 1 (2002)
- Federal Housing Subsidies, 37 Harv. J. Legis. 567 (2000)

Party political offices
Preceded by Steve Kerrigan	Democratic nominee for Lieutenant Governor of Massachusetts; 2018	Succeeded by Kim Driscoll
