= Lawrence Henry Chamberlain =

Dean of Columbia College
- In office 1950–1958
- Preceded by: Harry J. Carman
- Succeeded by: John Gorham Palfrey

Personal details
- Born: March 15, 1906 Challis, Idaho, U.S.
- Died: January 29, 1989 (aged 82) Monterey, California, U.S.
- Education: University of Idaho (BA); Columbia University (PhD)

Lawrence Henry Chamberlain (March 15, 1906 – January 29, 1989) was an American political scientist and academic administrator. He was the dean of Columbia College and vice president of Columbia University.

== Biography ==
Chamberlain was born in Challis, Idaho, on March 15, 1906, and taught in the local schools while a student in college. He received a bachelor's and a master's degree from the University of Idaho. He was an assistant professor at his alma mater before joining the faculty of Columbia University in 1941 and received his Ph.D. from Columbia in 1945. During World War II, Chamberlain served as a lieutenant in the United States Navy and served as a director of the United States Naval Reserve Midshipmen's School at Columbia University.

He was also named assistant executive officer of the Third Commission at the United Nations Conference on International Organization in San Francisco in 1945. During that time, he worked with Grayson L. Kirk, who would go on to become president of Columbia University from 1953 to 1968.

Chamberlain became a full professor in 1949 and was named dean of Columbia College in 1950, serving in that position until 1958. After stepping down from his deanship, Chamberlain became the Joseph L. Buttenwieser Professor of Human Relations at the University. He was named vice president of Columbia in 1962 and retired in 1967.

Dwight Eisenhower said of Chamberlain: "No man I have known was more dedicated in enthusiastic commitment to the vocation of teaching than Larry Chamberlain." Under his stewardship, Columbia grew to become one of the leading undergraduate schools in the country.

Chamberlain died on January 29, 1989, in Monterey, California. He was a resident of Pacific Grove, California. He was a member of the Century Association.

The Shanley & Chamberlain Prize, named in the memory of Chamberlain and Columbia alum US Marine Captain James Shanley, is awarded annually at Columbia for the best undergraduate essay in the areas of the American presidency, Congress or public policy.

Academic offices
Preceded by Harry J. Carman	Dean of Columbia College; 1950–1958	Succeeded by John Gorham Palfrey
