= Hooper-Eliot House =

Historic house in Massachusetts, United States

- U.S. National Register of Historic Places
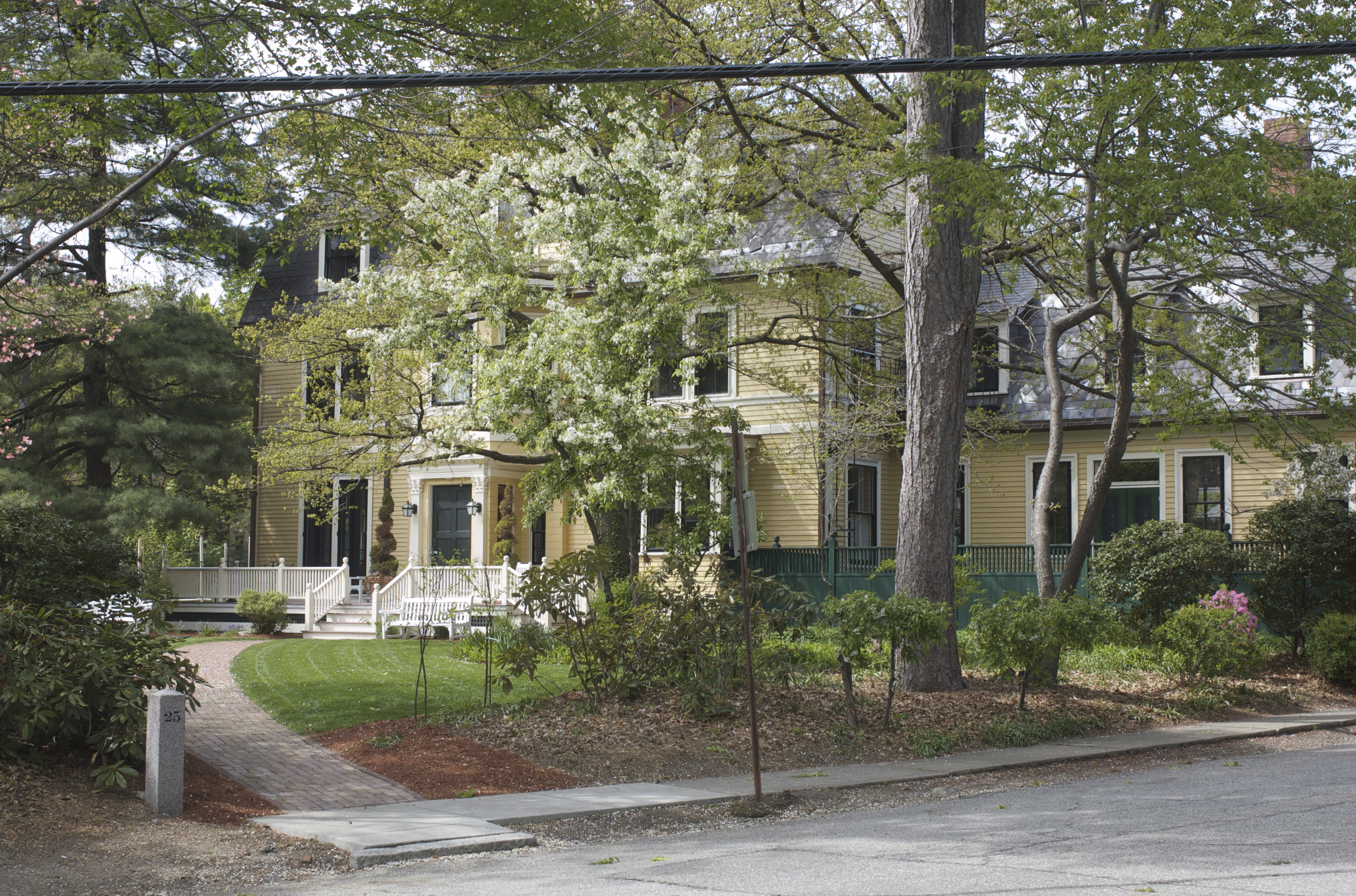

- Location within Massachusetts Location within the United States
- Location: 25 Reservoir Street, Cambridge, Massachusetts
- Coordinates: 42°22′45.1″N 71°8′12.2″W
- Built: 1872
- Architect: Sturgis & Brigham
- Architectural style: Colonial Revival, Stick/Eastlake
- MPS: Cambridge MRA
- NRHP reference No.: 83000809
- Added to NRHP: June 30, 1983

The Hooper-Eliot House is an historic house in Cambridge, Massachusetts. The three-story Stick-style house was built in 1872 for E.W. Hooper to a design by Sturgis & Brigham. The building's five-bay facade and gambrel roof form an early part of the effort by Sturgis to popularize the Georgian Revival. Its original main facade oriented to the north, a new south-facing entry was designed in 1902 by Lois Lilley Howe, featuring a broken scrolled pediment above the porch. The house was purchased by Samuel Atkins Eliot in that same year.

The house was listed on the National Register of Historic Places in 1983.

== See also ==
- National Register of Historic Places listings in Cambridge, Massachusetts
