= Judith Palfrey =

American pediatrician and author

Judith Swann Palfrey (née Sullivan; born 1945) is an American pediatrician and author. She is the T. Berry Brazelton Professor of Pediatrics at Harvard Medical School and the author of Community Child Health: An Action Plan for Today (1995) and Child Health In America: Making A Difference Through Advocacy (2006), and co-editor of Global Child Health Advocacy (2014) and the Disney Encyclopedia of Baby and Childcare (1995). She is also the former Faculty Dean of Adams House at Harvard University along with her husband Sean Palfrey who is also a pediatrician in Boston.

== Early life ==
Judith "Judy" Swann Sullivan was born in Texas in 1945 and grew up in Baltimore, Maryland. She is a daughter of Dr. Maurice Sullivan, who was a professor of dermatology at Johns Hopkins University, She is a granddaughter of Dr. Patrick James Sullivan and St. Clair Adams, all of New Orleans, Louisiana.

She attended the Bryn Mawr School before graduating from Radcliffe College in 1967. She received her MD in 1971 from the Columbia College of Physicians and Surgeons. She completed an internship and residency in pediatrics at Albert Einstein College of Medicine and a fellowship in community child health at Children's Hospital Boston.

== Career ==
Palfrey was chief of the Division of General Pediatrics at Children's Hospital Boston for 22 years. In 2008 she was named President-Elect of the American Academy of Pediatrics for 2009-2010. From September to December 2011, Palfrey was executive director of Michelle Obama's Let's Move! initiative. As of 2013, she is the director of the Global Pediatrics Program at Boston Children's Hospital.

== Personal life ==
In September 1967 Judith was married in Baltimore to Dr. John "Sean" Gorham Palfrey Jr., a son of John Gorham Palfrey, the Dean of Columbia College from 1958 to 1962, and Clochette (née Roosevelt) Palfrey, a granddaughter of President Theodore Roosevelt and a daughter of Kermit Roosevelt. Together, they are the parents of:

- John Palfrey (b. 1972), previously a professor and Vice Dean of Harvard Law School before becoming Head of School at Phillips Academy, is now President of the MacArthur Foundation.
- Quentin Palfrey (b. 1974), who ran for Lieutenant Governor of Massachusetts and is the former Executive Director of J-PAL.
- Katy Palfrey, who is the CEO of the Conservation Centers for Species Survival.

== Major publications ==
- Palfrey J.S. (1995) Community Child Health: An Action Plan for Today ISBN 0275946967
- Katz S.L., New M.I., Palfrey J.S. and Schulman I. (1995) The Disney Encyclopedia of Baby and Child Care ISBN 078688004X
- Palfrey J.S. (2006) Child Health in America. Making a Difference Through Advocacy ISBN 0801884527
- Palfrey, J.S. (editor) (2014) Global Child Health Advocacy ISBN 1581107803
