= Bevard House =

Bevard House (Hooper House)
- Location within Maryland
- 39.431°N 76.396319°W
- Location: 11122 Pfeffers Rd; Bradshaw, Maryland 21087

History
- Built: ca. 1850

The Bevard House, also known as Hooper House, is a historic log home located in Kingsville, in Baltimore County, Maryland. The house was constructed in the 1850s and purchased in 1854 by John Bevard who lived there with his family until 1893. At the time of its designation, the majority of its construction was still intact.

It is documented in the Maryland Inventory of Historic Properties.
