= John Palfrey =

US law professor

- Palfrey in 2023
- Born: John Gorham Palfrey VII; 1972 (age 53–54)
- Education: Harvard University (BA, JD); Pembroke College, Cambridge (MPhil)
- Employer(s): MacArthur Foundation 2019–present Andover 2012–2019; Berkman Center 2002–2008; Harvard Law School 2003–2011
- Notable work: Born Digital
- Spouse: Catherine Carter
- Relatives: Quentin Palfrey (brother); John Palfrey (grandfather); Kermit Roosevelt (great-great-grandfather)
- Family: Roosevelt family

John Gorham Palfrey VII (born 1972) is an American educator, scholar, and law professor. His areas of focus include emerging media, Internet freedom, online transparency and accountability, and child safety. In March 2019, he was named the president of the MacArthur Foundation effective September 1, 2019. Palfrey was the 15th Head of School at Phillips Academy in Andover, Massachusetts, from 2012 to 2019. He was executive director of Harvard's Berkman Center for Internet & Society from 2002 to 2008.

== Early life and education ==
Palfrey graduated from Phillips Exeter Academy in 1990. He attended Harvard College and graduated in 1994, magna cum laude. Palfrey was co-captain of the 1994 undefeated national championship Harvard Crimson men's squash team, winning the team's fourth straight national title. He graduated in 1997 from Pembroke College, Cambridge, with an M.Phil. in history. While there, he was distinguished as a Rotary Scholar. Palfrey returned to Boston and graduated from Harvard Law School in 2001. Palfrey was finance director in Boston for the campaign of Lois Pines for the position of Massachusetts Attorney General.

== Career ==
=== Harvard Law School ===
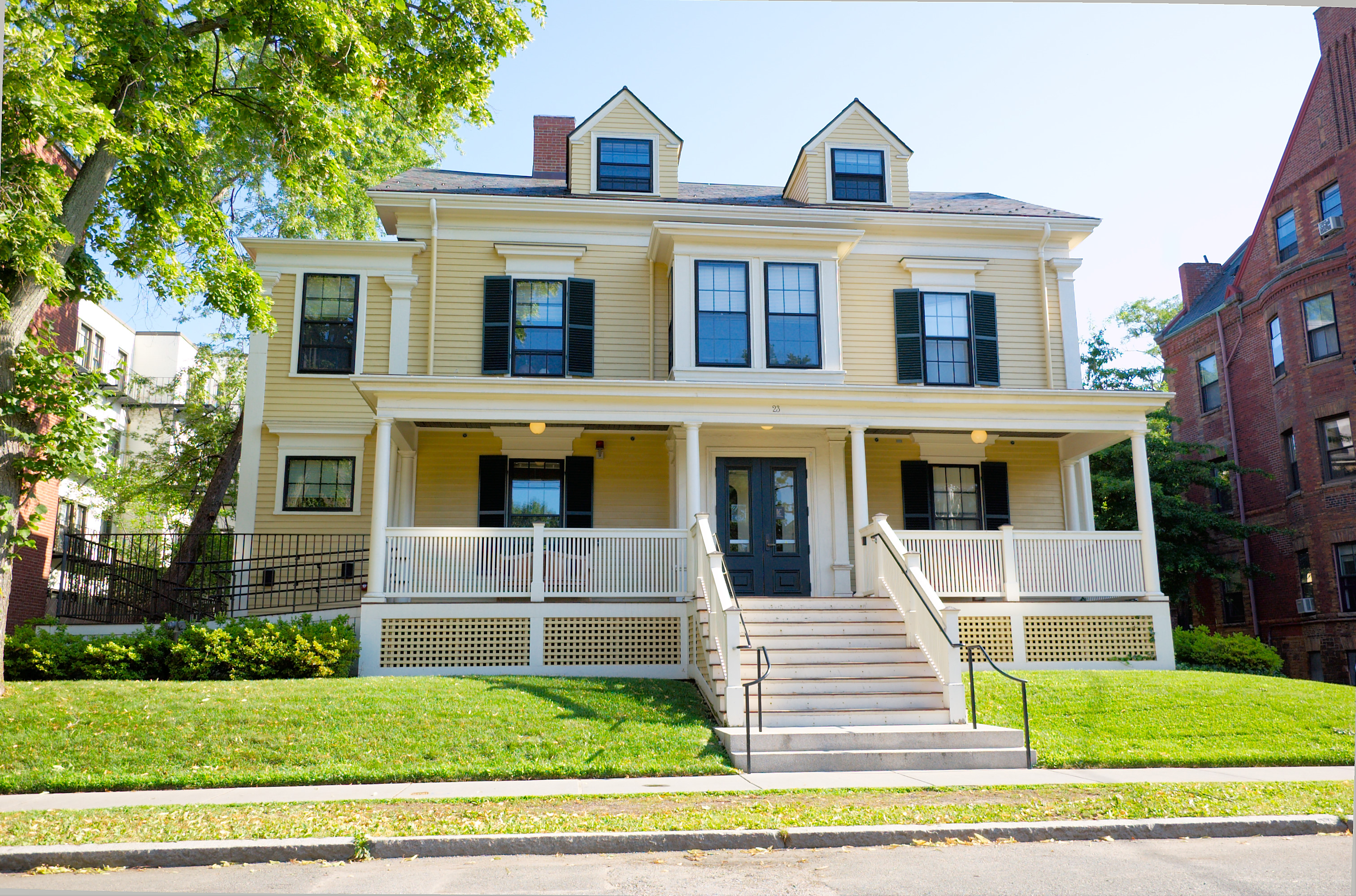
The Berkman Center for Internet and Society at Harvard University

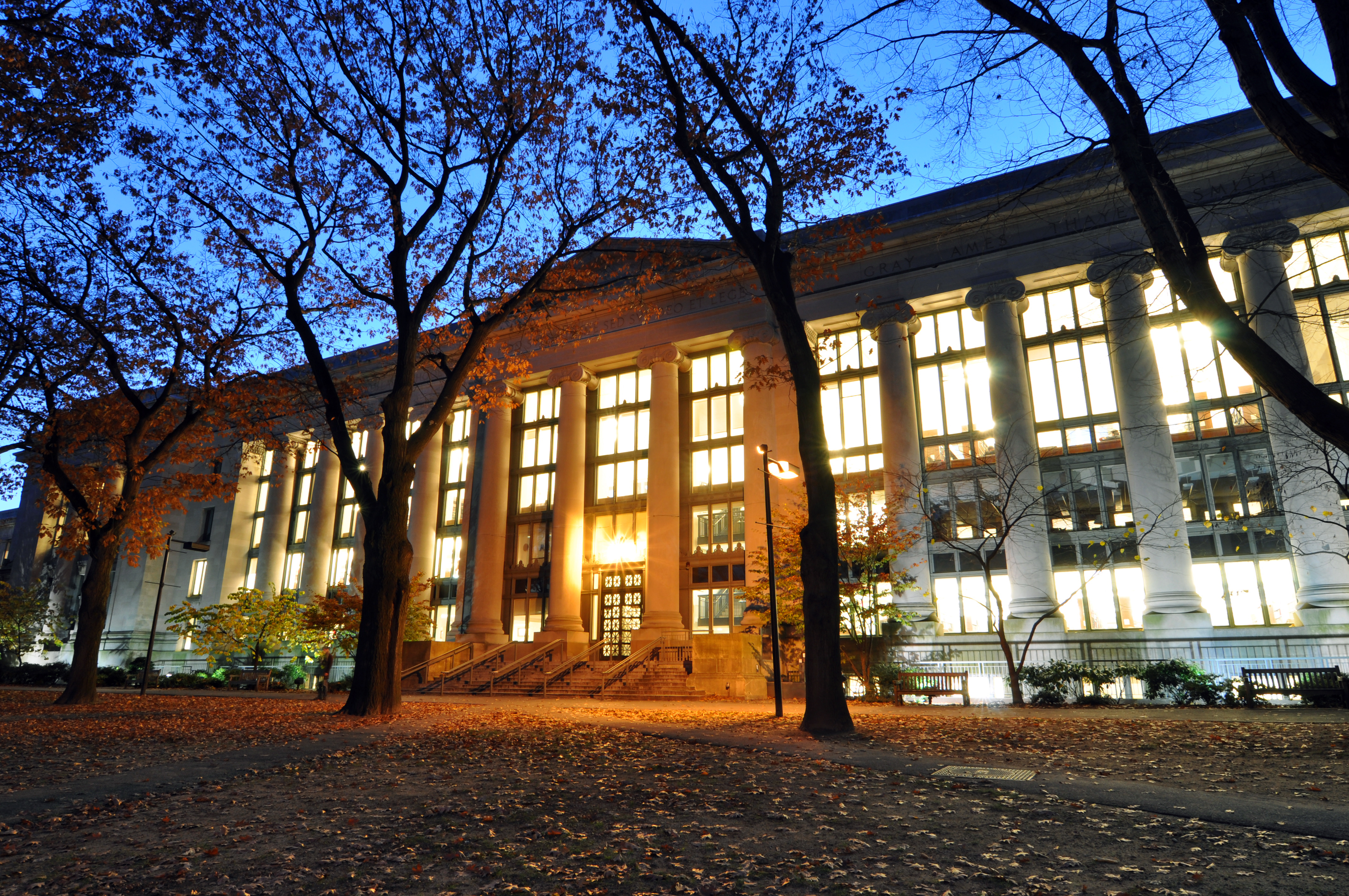
Harvard Law School library

Palfrey was executive director of Harvard University's Berkman Center for Internet and Society. He studied Internet usage and attitudes; according to his assessment, an important aspect of the digital revolution was the "massive generation gap" between those who were "born digital"—i.e., after 1980—and those who were not. Beginning in 2010, he helped promote a Berkman project entitled the Digital Public Library of America, which is an effort funded by the Alfred P. Sloan Foundation and others to enable a large-scale public file-sharing digital library. Palfrey described the online storehouse stocked with millions of digitized books as being one which "will contain everything we can get our hands on." The project began by offering noncopyrighted material but there are efforts to offer copyrighted material in the future with a fee-based arrangement that compensates copyright holders. Palfrey was the founding chairman of the Digital Public Library of America when it became a stand-alone entity, working in that role until 2015. Berkman, under his leadership, also initiated efforts to combat malware, spyware and computer viruses with a program called StopBadware.

In 2003, Palfrey was appointed to the faculty of Harvard Law School, partly hired by Elena Kagan, and his research interests included intellectual property issues such as copyright law, Internet law, and international law. He was a visiting professor of Law and Information at the University of St. Gallen, Switzerland, from 2007 to 2008. He was the vice-dean of library and information services at the Harvard Law School's library, and led a reorganization effort in 2009. He was appointed to the vice-dean post in 2008. He was also awarded tenure at the Harvard Law School in 2008.

=== Andover ===
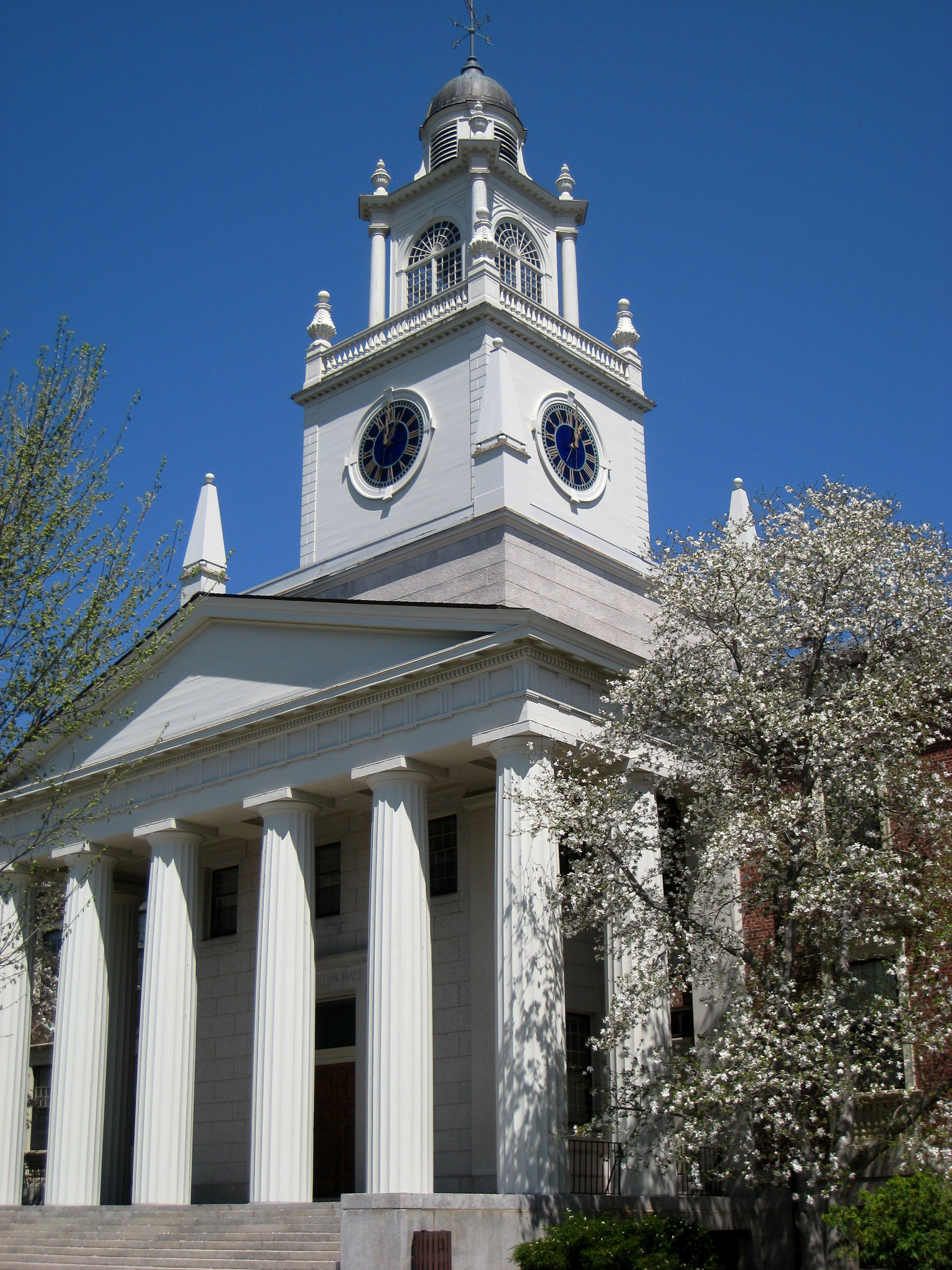
Phillips Academy

In 2012, Palfrey became the head of school at Phillips Academy in Andover, Massachusetts. He was the fifteenth head of school, and his investiture was celebrated on September 26, 2012. While at Andover, he was elected as the chairperson of the Knight Foundation, a charitable organization which focuses on how information can improve democratic institutions. He was profiled in Town and Country magazine in 2015. During his tenure at Phillips Academy, the school was the only one of its kind to maintain need blind admissions and reached a high of 86 per cent admissions yield, setting records both for applications and yield.

Palfrey was elected a member of the American Academy of Arts and Sciences in 2021.

== Internet issues ==
Palfrey is regarded as an authority about how people use technology, including how they relate to information and engage in politics in emerging digital media such as the Internet. According to Palfrey, digital natives (those born after 1980 and who grew up with the Internet) are more likely to "see relationships differently" as well as access information in new ways from previous generations. He is a supporter of information sharing while maintaining copyrights:

We should figure out how to offer legitimate services that enable people to be accountable to one another online, using innovations like Creative Commons licenses, which make sharing legitimately much easier.

— John Palfrey in the Boston Globe, 2004

In 2008, Palfrey was the chair of the Internet Safety Technical Task Force, a year-long national effort to explore how children could "avoid unwanted contact and content" online. He believes digital literacy should be an important public issue in schools so that kids can "sort credible from non-credible information". Palfrey testified before Congress on child safety issues in the digital age. He advocated flexibility in legal solutions for coping with cyberbullying, which happens when "kids treat one another awfully online", and he recommended that laws not be too tied to specific technologies. He is a fan of Wikipedia:

I would use Wikipedia. I think it's a fabulous, fabulous place to turn. Because some of the information is absolutely credible and really useful.

— John Palfrey in The New York Times, 2010

In his book Born Digital, Palfrey and co-author Urs Gasser argued that solutions to bad behavior online could combine parental oversight, public education, responsible behavior by corporations, and only use punitive laws as a last resort. Born Digital was described as "a landmark sociological study of today's early adults". The book was reviewed in the journal Science and the Washington Post. Reviewer Amanda Henry described the authors as "knowledgeable but never pedantic". Library Journal named Born Digital one of its top Science and Technology books for 2008, the only computer science book named to this list. According to one account, Palfrey urged his fellow Harvard Law School professor Lawrence Lessig to run for Congress. Palfrey was a member of a pro bono legal team that helped defend street artist Shepard Fairey in a "fair use" case involving an Associated Press photograph of Barack Obama in his Hope poster.

Palfrey urged Congress to write legislation to discourage prominent Internet firms such as Google, Yahoo, Microsoft, and Cisco Systems from bending to pressure by foreign governments to censor web information or forcing them to reveal the identities of dissidents, as part of the Open Net Initiative. His work on how Internet usage can affect politics within democracies was cited as influential to the dissidents in Iran responsible for the Green Revolution. These references resulted in his being named by the Iranian government, along with colleague Ethan Zuckerman, as a so-called "conspirator" in the trials that took place in Iran in 2009 and 2010. Palfrey commented in the Boston Globe about how political campaigns in the United States were increasingly being carried out in cyberspace.

In 2023, Palfrey highlights the challenges of defining derivative works in copyright law, particularly with AI's evolving role. He suggests that the legal interpretation may become more complex as AI advances. Palfrey also emphasizes the need to reevaluate Section 230 of the Communications Decency Act to address AI-driven deception. He advocates for a more comprehensive regulatory approach in line with international models.

In 2025, Palfrey, together with Eszter Hargittai, published the book Wired Wisdom : How to age better online.

== BiblioTECH: Libraries and Democracy ==
Palfrey emphasizes that for-profit information sources like Google and Amazon serve a different purpose than increasing public access to knowledge, focusing primarily on profit. In his book, BiblioTech: Why Libraries Matter More Than Ever In An Age of Google, Palfrey cites the increasingly dominant "privatized interests" of technology companies, urging libraries and other entities to find "new ways to promote democratic access to information." He describes the book as a "love letter to libraries," arguing that they are essential to the 21st-century information landscape.

In 2015, Inside Higher Ed columnist Barbara Fister reviewed the book, recommending that non-librarians read it.

== Family ==
Palfrey's parents are both professors of medicine with a specialty in pediatrics. His mother, Judith Palfrey, was the chief of general pediatrics at Boston Children's Hospital and is a professor emeritus of pediatrics at Harvard Medical School. His father, Sean Palfrey, is a professor emeritus of clinical pediatrics at Boston University Medical School. Palfrey's parents were faculty deans of Adams House at Harvard College. Palfrey is a great-great-grandson of United States President Theodore Roosevelt. His family has many connections to Harvard University, including through his ancestor, John G. Palfrey, the first dean of the Harvard Divinity School and prominent historian of the 19th century. Palfrey married Catherine Carter in 1998. In 2003, the Palfrey House in Cambridge, MA, which had been built in 1831 by an ancestor, was relocated to Hammond Street.

Palfrey's father was born John Gorham Palfrey, III, and is a 1967 graduate of Harvard, as is his mother, born Judith Swann Sullivan. His father is also considered John Gorham Palfrey, IV or John Palfrey, VI. He had a younger brother who didn't live for a day (December 5, 1946) and a younger sister, Antonia Ford Palfrey, named for their 3rd great-grandmother, Antonia (née Ford) Willard.

John's 2nd great-grandfather, John Carver Palfrey (1833–1906), fought in the United States Civil War, as did his 3rd great-uncle, Francis Winthrop Palfrey (1831–1889). His great-grandfather, John Gorham Palfrey II (1875–1945) was an 1896 graduate of Harvard and a lawyer in Boston. His grandfather, John Gorham Palfrey, Jr. or the III (1919–1979), was a 1940 graduate of Harvard, served in World War II, was appointed to the Atomic Energy Commission by President John F. Kennedy, and was a professor at Columbia University from 1952 until his death in 1979, concurrently dean of Columbia College from 1958 to 1962.

His grandmother was Belle Wyatt "Clochette" Roosevelt Palfrey (1919–1985), a daughter of Kermit Roosevelt.

== Publications ==
- Palfrey, John; Gasser, Urs (2008). Born Digital: Understanding the First Generation of Digital Natives. Basic Books.
- Deibert, Ronald; Palfrey, John; Rohozinski, Rafal; Zittrain, Jonathan (2008). Access Denied: The Practice and Policy of Global Internet Filtering. MIT Press.
- Deibert, Ronald; Palfrey, John; Rohozinski, Rafal; Zittrain, Jonathan (2010). Access Controlled: The Shaping of Power, Rights, and Rule in Cyberspace. MIT Press.
- Palfrey, John (2011). Intellectual Property Strategy. MIT Press.
- Palfrey, John; Gasser, Urs (2012). Interop: The Promise and the Perils of Highly Interconnected Systems. Basic Books.
- Palfrey, John (2015). BiblioTech. Why Libraries Matter More Than Ever in the Age of Google. Basic Books. ISBN 9780465042999.

== See also ==
- Digital native
- Berkman Center for Internet and Society at Harvard University
- StopBadware.org
- Digital Public Library of America

Academic offices
Preceded by Barbara Landis Chase	Head of School of Phillips Academy; 2012-2019	Succeeded by Raynard S. Kington
