= William Palfrey =

American patriot (1741–1780)

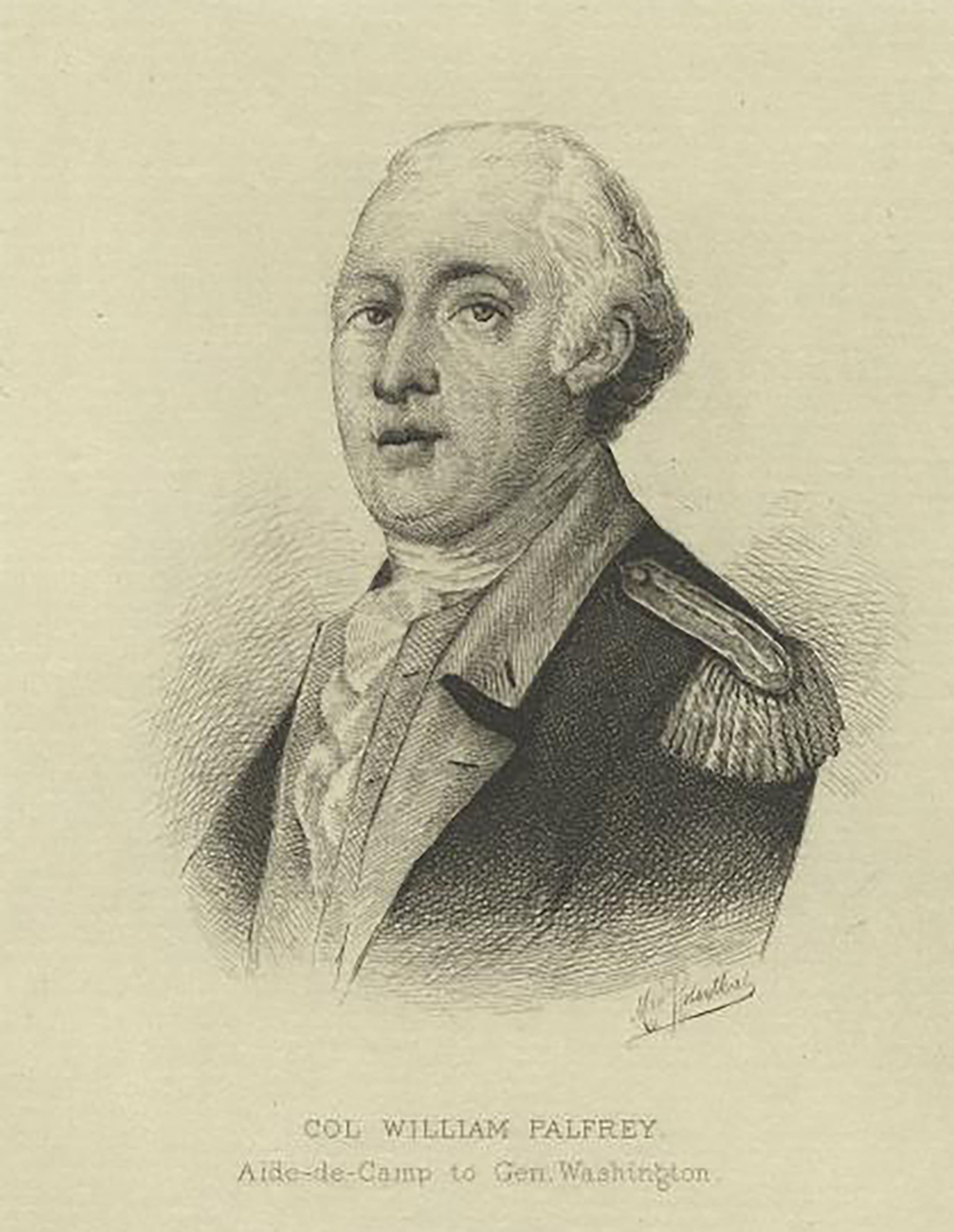
- Born: 1741; Boston, Massachusetts, U.S.
- Died: 1780 (aged 38–39); Atlantic Ocean
- Occupation: Patriot
- Known for: Disappearance at sea

William Palfrey (1741–1780) was an American Patriot.

== Early life ==
William Palfrey was born February 24, 1741, in Boston, Massachusetts.

== Freemasonry ==
In 1769, Palfrey was Substitute Master of the Lodge of St. Andrew, a masonic lodge warranted by the Grand Lodge of Scotland in 1756. Palfrey was Substitute Master when the Master was Joseph Warren and the lodge Secretary was Paul Revere. Member, St. Andrew's Lodge at Boston: EA, December 5, 1760; FC, December 18, 1760; MM, January 27, 1761, and later served as Junior Warden and Senior Warden of this Lodge. Palfrey, with seven others, petitioned the Massachusetts Grand Lodge on May 11, 1770, for new lodge under the title of The Massachusetts Lodge. The charter was granted May 13, 1770, and Palfrey's name is the second one on the charter. He is on record as SW of this lodge on June 1, 1770; elected WM December 3, 1770, and again, December 18, 1778. Elected Grand Secretary of the Massachusetts Grand Lodge December 4, 1778. "It was in all probability through the influence of William Palfrey, Grand Secretary, that the charter (The Massachusetts Lodge) was granted."

== Career ==
Working as John Hancock's chief clerk, he was active in the movements that preceded the American Revolution, and visited England in 1771. During the War of Independence, he served as an aide-de-camp to George Washington in March and April 1776, after which Hancock arranged to have him appointed paymaster-general in the Continental Army, with the rank of lieutenant-colonel. In November 1780, he was appointed consul-general in France by a unanimous vote of Congress, and embarked in a ship for that country, which was never heard of after she had left the capes. He was succeeded as paymaster-general by John Pierce Jr.

== Disappearance ==
Lost at sea in December, 1780, while on special business to France by order of the Continental Congress. His assignment was "consul to reside in France" and "he sailed for his post on the Shillala, an armed ship of 16 guns. The vessel was never heard from after it passed the Delaware capes."

== Legacy ==
His grandson John G. Palfrey was a U.S. Representative from Massachusetts.

== See also ==
- List of people who disappeared mysteriously at sea
