= Information Society Project =

Information Society Project at Yale Law School
- Formation: 1997
- Founder: Jack Balkin
- Type: Technology research center
- Location: Yale Law School, New Haven, Connecticut, United States
- Website: isp.yale.edu

The Information Society Project (ISP) at Yale Law School is an intellectual center studying the implications of the Internet and new information technologies for law and society. The ISP was founded in 1997 by Jack Balkin, Knight Professor of Constitutional Law and the First Amendment at Yale Law School. Jack Balkin is the director of the ISP.

Chinmayi Arun is the executive director of the ISP (2022–present). Previous Executive Directors have included Valerie Belair-Gagnon (2014–22), Margot E. Kaminsky (2011–14), Laura DeNardis (2008–11), and Eddan Katz.

Faculty Fellows have included: Yochai Benkler, Professor of Law; Ian Ayres, William K. Townsend Professor of Law; Robert Post (law professor), David, Boies Professor of Law; Carol Rose, Gordon Bradford Tweedy, Professor of Law and Organization; and Henry Smith, Professor of Law. Fellows have included: Beth Simone Noveck, Mike Godwin, Wendy Seltzer, Peter Suber, and Michael Zimmer.

== History and mission ==
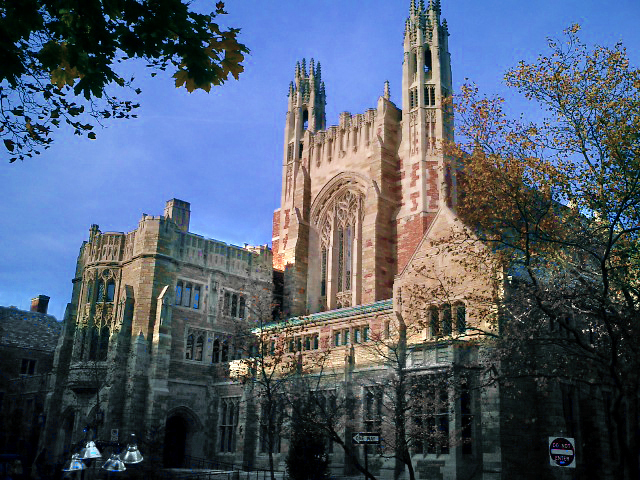
Yale Law School in the Sterling Law Building

The ISP was founded by Yale Law Professor Jack Balkin in 1997 and celebrated its 15th year in 2012. It now hosts a number of initiatives, including the Abrams Institute for Freedom of Expression, the Knight Law and Media Program, the Wikimedia/Yale Law School Initiative on Intermediaries and Information, the Media Freedom Access and Information Clinic, the Program for the Study of Reproductive Justice, and the Thomson Reuters Initiative on Law and Technology. The center is housed on the fourth floor of Baker Hall, located at 40 Ashmun Street in New Haven.

ISP fellows from around the globe come to pursue research and produce scholarship, in the form of books, articles in academic journals and popular publications, blog posts, and policy documents. Yale ISP faculty and fellows have also conducted major public policy reviews of current issues in technology and law, and written amicus briefs for cases appearing before the Supreme Court and US Courts of Appeal.

Yale ISP faculty members, postdoctoral fellows, and law school student fellows engage in research, education, and social activism geared toward promoting global access to knowledge, advocating democratic values in the information society, and protecting and expanding civil liberties in the Information Age. The ISP has contributed to the development of the Access to Knowledge social movement, which aims to build an intellectual framework that will protect access to knowledge both as the basis for sustainable human development and to safeguard human rights. ISP-led courses, projects, a weekly speaker series, and workshops that integrate Yale law students into the exploration of new problems in collaboration with departments across the Yale campus. The ISP also provides advice and education to policy makers, business leaders, nonprofit organizations, and the global legal community. International conferences organized by the ISP have addressed topics such as Access to Knowledge, Cybercrime, Library 2.0, Open ICT Standards, Globalization and Information Flows, and Search Engine Law.

== Projects and initiatives ==
=== Access to Knowledge ===
For several years, the ISP has collaborated on A2K projects with partner institutions in Egypt, Brazil, and other countries. This work has involved several workshops and conferences organized by ISP fellows, and culminated in a series of books, including Access to Knowledge in India: New Research on Intellectual Property edited by Ramesh Subramarian and Lea Shaver, and Access to Knowledge in Brazil: New Research on Intellectual Property edited by Lea Shaver.

=== Floyd Abrams Institute for Freedom of Expression ===
The Institute's mission is both practical and scholarly. It includes a clinic for Yale Law students to engage in litigation, draft model legislation, and advise lawmakers and policy makers on issues of media freedom and informational access. It promotes scholarship and law reform on emerging questions concerning both traditional and new media. The Institute also holds scholarly conferences and events at Yale on First Amendment issues and on related issues of access to information, Internet and media law, telecommunications, privacy, and intellectual property.

The Abrams Institute is a Partnering Organization in Free Speech Week, a yearly non-partisan week-long celebration of Freedom of Speech and Expression.

=== Knight Law and Media Program ===
The program includes courses related to law and media; writing workshops; speakers, conferences and events; and career counseling and support for summer internships. The Program's director is Professor Jack Balkin. The Law School received a grant from John S. and James L. Knight Foundation to support many of these efforts through the Knight Law and Media Scholars Program.

In Fall 2014, the Tow Center for Digital Journalism at Columbia Journalism School and the Information Society Project of Yale Law School have partnered to present this series of 5 lectures as part of the larger Journalism After Snowden project. Journalism After Snowden, funded by The Tow Foundation and the John S. and James L. Knight Foundation is a yearlong series of events, research projects and writing from the Tow Center for Digital Journalism in collaboration with Columbia Journalism Review. Speakers have included Ethan Zuckerman, James Bamford, and Jil Abramson.

=== Foreign Affairs in the Internet Age ===
The initiative studies the ways that foreign policy affects Internet governance, and the ways that the Internet has changed how foreign policy is conducted. It represents a collaboration between the Information Society Project (ISP) and scholars of international law and politics at Yale Law School.

=== Thomson Reuters Initiative on Law and Technology ===
The Thomson Reuters Initiative on Law and Technology supports ISP's "ideas" lunches, and the Thomson Reuters ISP Speaker Series on Information Law and Information Policy. Topics have included copyright and net neutrality.

In March 2014, the Yale Law School Information Society Project hosted a conference on Innovation Law Beyond IP.

=== Program for the Study of Reproductive Justice ===
The ISP's Program for the Study of Reproductive Justice (PSRJ) serves as a national center for academic research and development of new ideas to promote justice with respect to reproductive health issues, provide a supportive environment for young scholars interested in academic or advocacy careers focusing on reproductive rights and justice issues; and provide opportunities for communication between the academic and advocacy communities. Priscilla Smith is the program director of PSRJ.

=== Media Freedom and Information Access Clinic ===
The Media Freedom and Information Access Clinic (MFIA) is dedicated to increasing government transparency, defending the essential work of news gatherers, and protecting freedom of expression through impact litigation, direct legal services, and policy work.

The clinic was established in 2009 by a group of Yale Law School students and, since then, has provided pro bono representation to clients on a diverse array of matters touching on issues of transparency, free speech, and press freedom. Clients include independent journalists, news organizations, public interest as well as advocacy organizations, activists, and researchers. The practice is focused in the state and federal courts of Connecticut and New York, although the clinic has represented clients in many other parts of the country as well.

The clinic is co-taught by Jack Balkin, Knight Professor of Constitutional Law and the First Amendment.

Every year, the clinic hosts a FOIA bootcamp.

MFIA is part of the Abrams Institute for Freedom of Expression, which is affiliated with and administered by the Information Society Project at Yale Law School.

=== Visual Law Project ===
The Yale Visual Law Project produces short documentary films on legal issues to advance public debate. Films include:

The Worst of the Worst (2012), a hard-hitting portrait of Connecticut's Supermax prison, where inmates and COs grapple with extreme isolation.

Alienation (2011) follows the story of two families swept up in the 2007 raid and examines current controversies in immigration law and policy in the United States.

Stigma (2011) explores the dynamic between the community and the police through the eyes of three people who grew up on the streets of New York City.

== Members ==
Notable Fellows include or have included Danielle Citron, Yochai Benkler, Mary Anne Franks, Irin Carmon, Dayo Olopade, Wendy Seltzer, Michael Zimmer, Nabiha Syed, Joan Feigenbaum, Daniel Solove, and Laura DeNardis.

Faculty include Jack Balkin, Emily Bazelon, Logan Beirne, Owen M. Fiss, Linda Greenhouse, Robert C. Post, Scott J. Shapiro, and Reva Siegel.

The center also has active groups of affiliates and alumni who host and participate in their projects each year.

== See also ==
- Berkman Center for Internet & Society at Harvard Law School
- Berkeley Center for Law and Technology at UC Berkeley School of Law
- Canadian Internet Policy and Public Interest Clinic at the University of Ottawa
- Center for Global Communication Studies and the University of Pennsylvania
- Centre for Internet and Society (India)
- Haifa Center for Law & Technology at Haifa University
- NEXA Center for Internet and Society
- Openlaw
- Oxford Internet Institute at Oxford University
