= Francesca Musiani =

Italian internet governance researcher

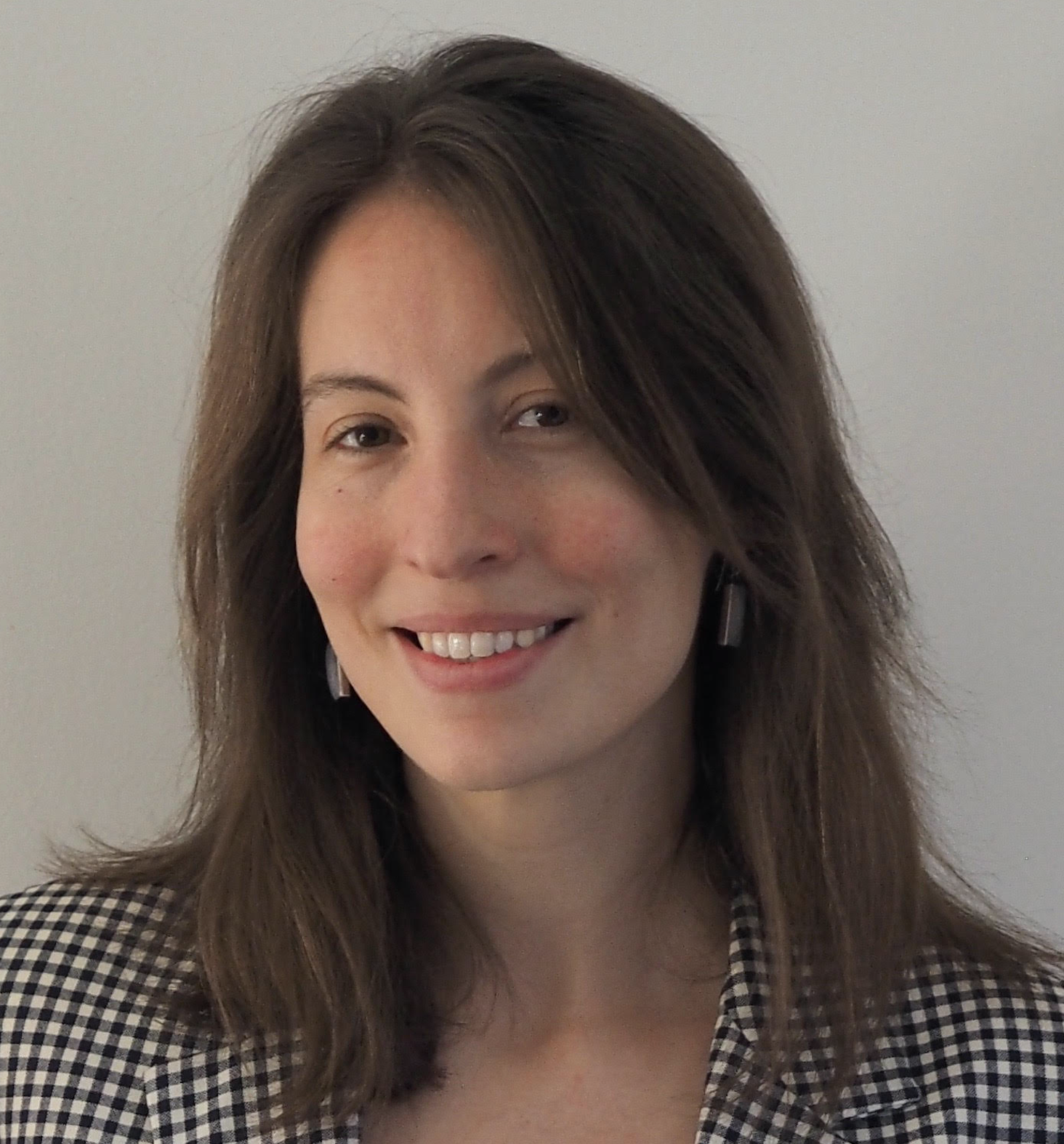
- Francesca Musiani in 2022
- Born: 1984 (age 41–42); Italy
- Citizenship: Italy
- Education: Ph.D. in Socio-Economics of Innovation
- Occupations: Author, Scholar
- Writing career
- Subjects: Internet governance, digital sovereignty, encryption, infrastructure studies
- Notable awards: CNIL Award for Doctoral Research

Francesca Musiani is an Italian author and scholar of internet governance. She is a research professor at the French National Center for Scientific Research (CNRS) and holds the position of the director of the Internet and Society Center.

== Career ==
Musiani was awsrded PhD in socio-economics of innovation in 2012. Her dissertation research focused on features and implications of alternative peer-to-peer technologies, which has been awarded by the French national regulatory body CNIL. After her dissertation, Musiani was a fellow at the Berkman Klein Center at Harvard University.

Next to her appointment at CNRS, Musiani is currently associate researcher at the Center for the sociology of innovation at the interdisciplinary innovation institute (i3) at MINES ParisTech and a Global Fellow at the Internet Governance Lab at the American University in Washington, DC. Musiani has worked closely together with well known internet governance scholars such as Laura DeNardis. She served Chair of Outreach and Partnerships on the Steering Committee of Giganet and is in the international council of the International Association for Media and Communication Research (IAMCR)

Musiani's research focuses on the relation between internet infrastructure, geopolitics, digital sovereignty, encryption, and the rights of internet users.

== Selected academic publications ==
Musiani, Francesca. 2022. "Infrastructuring Digital Sovereignty: A Research Agenda for an Infrastructure-Based Sociology of Digital Self-Determination Practices." Information, Communication & Society, Special Issue AoIR 2021, "Independence," 25 (6): 785–800

Musiani, Francesca. 2016. "Alternative Technologies as Alternative Institutions: The Case of the Domain Name System." In The Turn to Infrastructure in Internet Governance, edited by Francesca Musiani, Derrick L. Cogburn, Laura DeNardis, and Nanette S. Levinson, 73–86. Springer

Musiani, Francesca. 2013. "Governance by Algorithms." Internet Policy Review 2 (3)

== Books ==
Carey Libbrecht, Liz (trans.), Paco Libbrecht (trans.), Françoise Daucé, Benjamin Loveluck, Francesca Musiani. 2025. Digital Authoritarianism in the Making: Repression and Resistance on the Russian Internet. MIT Press.

Perarnaud, Clément, Julien Rossi, Francesca Musiani, and Lucien Castex. 2024. L'avenir d'Internet: unité ou fragmentation. Bordeaux. Eds Le Bord de l'Eau.

Daucé, Françoise, Benjamin Loveluck, and Francesca Musiani. 2023. Genèse d'un autoritarisme numérique. Répression et résistance sur Internet en Russie, 2012-2022. Presses des Mines.

Ermoshina, Ksenia, and Francesca Musiani. 2022. Concealing for Freedom. Mattering Press

Musiani, Francesca, Camille Paloque-Bergès, Valérie Schafer, and Benjamin G. Thierry. 2019. Qu'est-ce qu'une archive du web ? Qu'est-ce qu'une archive du web ? Encyclopédie numérique. Marseille: OpenEdition Press

Musiani, Francesca, Derrick L. Cogburn, Laura DeNardis, and Nanette S. Levinson, eds. 2016. The Turn to Infrastructure in Internet Governance. New York: Palgrave Macmillan

== Non-academic contributions ==
Research report for European Parliament - Perarnaud, Clément, Julien Rossi, Francesca Musiani, and Lucien Castex. 2022. "'Splinternets': Addressing the Renewed Debate on Internet Fragmentation." PE 729.530. Panel for the Future of Science and Technology, Scientific Foresight Unit (STOA). Brussels: European Parliamentary Research Service

== Awards ==
- 2023 : Cyber Researcher Award - French Cybersecurity Women's Circle
- 2023 : Winner, Social Sciences Foundation Prize, Class of 2023-2024 "A world at war?"
- 2013 : French national regulatory body CNIL awarded Musiani with the 'Data Processing and Liberties' Thesis Prize for her research on P2P architectures
