= NEXA Center for Internet and Society =

Italian research center

Coordinates: 45.06461°N 7.65640°E

NEXA Center for Internet & Society
- Formation: 26 November 2006
- Type: Technology research center
- Location: Polytechnic University of Turin, Turin, Italy
- Website: nexa.polito.it

The NEXA Center for Internet & Society is a research center founded at the Department of Control and Computer Engineering of Polytechnic University of Turin. It is an academic research center which studies the Internet with a multidisciplinary approach: technical, legal and economic.

== History, mission and projects ==
The Nexa Center for Internet & Society was founded on 26 November 2006 by professors Juan Carlos De Martin and Marco Ricolfi. Based in Turin (Italy), it coordinated, among other projects, COMMUNIA, the European Thematic Network on the digital public domain (2007-2011), LAPSI, the European Thematic Network on legal aspects of public sector information (2010-2012) and represents Creative Commons in Italy. The Nexa Center also coordinates SeLiLi (Servizio Licenze Libere), a service offering advice on free licenses. A notable software project of the Center is Neubot (the network neutrality bot): a free software Internet botthat gathers network performance data useful to investigatenetwork neutrality.

In April 2012, the Nexa Center has launched the “Digital Revolution” undergraduate course at the Politecnico di Torino, the first full-scale teaching activity entirely planned by a member of the Nexa Center (Nexa co-director Juan Carlos De Martin), focused on Internet & Society, and involving several members of the staff of the Center, as well as prestigious guest lecturers.

The Nexa Center is part of a global network of Internet and Society centers with the Alexander von Humboldt Institute for Internet and Society, the Berkman Center for Internet and Society at Harvard University, the Centre for Internet and Society Bangalore, the Center for Technology & Society at Fundação Getulio Vargas (FGV) Law School, the Internet and Society Laboratory at KEIO University SFC, the MIT Media Lab and The MIT Center for Civic Media. In 2013 the Nexa Center has become part of the Global Network Initiative (GNI), a multi-stakeholder international group devoted to protect and advance freedom of expression and privacy in the ICT sector. In October 2014, the Nexa Center took the role of coordinator of the Global Network of Internet & Society Research Centers. From November 2015, the Nexa Center for Internet & Society is a partner of Lumen, the project of the Berkman Center at Harvard on network transparency.

The Nexa Center works with the European Commission, national and local governments, companies and other institutions. The aim of the center is to broaden the understanding of the main factors characterizing the Internet, their dynamics and their impact on society.

== Members ==
The Nexa Center is run by two co-directors, a board of trustees, staff members and several fellows. Professor Charles Nesson is a member of the NEXA Board of Trustees together with another Berkman Center for Internet and Society co-director, Prof. Yochai Benkler, and also with other well known Italian and foreign personalities as Raffaele Meo and Michelangelo Pistoletto.

== See also ==
- Communia
- Creative Commons
- Berkman Center for Internet & Society
