= Chinmayi =

Chinmayi is a given name. Notable people with the name include:

- Chinmayi Arun, Indian law professor
- Chinmayi Sripada (born 1984), Indian singer and voice actress
