= Alexander von Humboldt Institute for Internet and Society =

German research institute

- Abbreviation: HIIG
- Formation: 2012
- Location: Berlin, Germany
- Official language: German and English
- Website: www.hiig.de/en/

The Alexander von Humboldt Institute for Internet and Society (HIIG) is a research institution in Berlin. Its stated mission is to research “the development of the internet from a societal perspective with the aim of better understanding the accompanying digitalisation of all areas of life.”

The institute was founded by its shareholders – Humboldt Universität zu Berlin (HU), the Berlin University of the Arts (UdK) and the Berlin Social Science Center (WZB) – with the Hans Bredow Institute (HBI) for Media Research in Hamburg as an integrated cooperation partner. The research directorate is made up of Jeanette Hofmann, Björn Scheuermann, Wolfgang Schulz and Thomas Schildhauer.

HIIG, along with the Oxford Internet Institute, the Berkman Klein Center for Internet & Society and other institutes, founded the Global Network of Internet & Society Research Centers (NoC). The HIIG also initiated the European Hub of the NoC.

== Founding initiative ==
The founding institutions and sponsors include Humboldt-Universität zu Berlin, the Berlin University of the Arts and the WZB Berlin Social Science Center. In cooperation with the Hans Bredow Institute for Media Research in Hamburg, which serves as the fourth cooperation partner, the research institute aims to bring together leading academics and stakeholders from all walks of life to research questions about the internet. HIIG's focus is on the topics of innovation and regulation as well as on the specialised fields of information law, media law and constitutional law. It was founded with the aim of better understanding the changes in society brought about by the internet.

The four founding directors are Ingolf Pernice (Humboldt-Universität), Thomas Schildhauer (Berlin University of the Arts) and Jeanette Hofmann (WZB) as well as Wolfgang Schulz (Hans Bredow Institute). Start-up funding of 4.5 million euros over a period of three years was provided by Google Inc. The institute's scientific independence has been safeguarded through its special construction as a research entity and foundation. The research is carried out by the research entity.

The goals and content of the research are decided by an independent research company with oversight provided by the Scientific Advisory Board. The work of the institute began in October 2011.While the institute's work began in 2011, it did not acquire legal form until 2012 . Since then, the Internet and Society Foundation has become a shareholder of HIIG.

== Research programmes and research questions ==
According to its own statements, HIIG's research work aims to deepen research in the field of internet and society, both theoretically and empirically, and thus contribute to a better understanding of digital society. The research programme is particularly concerned with the far-reaching social changes brought about by digitalisation in the area of governance and innovation. Three central research programmes guide HIIG's medium-term research activities. The focus here is on the following central research programmes and questions:

- Research programme 1: The Evolving Digital Society: Which relevant concepts and theoretical approaches are discussed publicly as well as within the scientific community?
- Research programme 2: Data, Actors, Infrastructures: What are the key factors influencing the changes in their relationships to each other?
- Research programme 3: Knowledge & Society: Can new patterns of research and knowledge transfer be observed in the digital age?

The institute's programme-oriented research is flanked by research groups and research projects. The research groups include the AI & Society Lab, the Innovation, Entrepreneurship & Society research area, and the Global Constitutionalism and the Internet group.

Together with the Berkman Klein Center, the Digital Asia Hub and the Leibniz Institute for Media Research | Hans Bredow Institute, the institute runs the “Ethics of Digitalisation” research project under the patronage of German President Frank-Walter Steinmeier. It is funded by the Mercator Foundation.

In 2020, the Institute launched the Digital Urban Center for Ageing & Health (DUCAH) together with the Einstein Center Digital Future and the Internet and Society Foundation. The project aims to research healthcare and digitalisation in the field. To this end, it aims to create a forum where civil society, academia, public administration and politics can engage in exchange.

HIIG served as the as scientific office of the Third Engagement Report. The publication was handed over to the Federal Ministry for Family Affairs, Senior Citizens, Women and Youth (BMFSFJ) in January 2020 and to the German Bundestag in May of the same year.

== Funding ==
The founding of the institute was made possible by a grant from Google. Other sponsors and supporters include the Federal Ministry of Education and Research, the Federal Ministry for Economic Affairs and Energy, the Federal Ministry of Labour and Social Affairs, the Federal Ministry for Family Affairs, Senior Citizens, Women and Youth, the German Research Foundation, the Mercator Foundation, Commerzbank Foundation and H2020.

== Structure and members ==
HIIG's shareholder is the Internet and Society Foundation, consisting of the Founders' Council and the board of directors. The chairperson of the Founders' Council is Otfried Jarren. The members of the Founders' Council are Ursula Noack (WZB), Sabine Kunst (HU), Norbert Palz (UdK), Wieland Holfelder (representative of the Fördergesellschaft GFI gGmbH), Ulrike Guérot (Danube University Krems), Abraham Bernstein (University of Zurich) and Carsten Busch (HTW Berlin). Thomas Schildhauer and Wolfgang Schulz form the board of directors.

The members of the Scientific Advisory Board are:

- Anne Cheung
- William H. Dutton
- Claudia Eckert
- Niva Elkin-Koren (chairperson)
- Oliver Gassmann
- Friedrich W. Hesse
- Kim Lane Scheppele
- Joseph H. H. Weiler

HIIG is under the scientific management of four directors. Postdoctoral fellows, doctoral students, associates, visiting scholars and research assistants conduct research at the institute. Since the founding of HIIG, the executive management has been under the responsibility of Karina Preiß, a media economist.

== Events and knowledge transfer ==
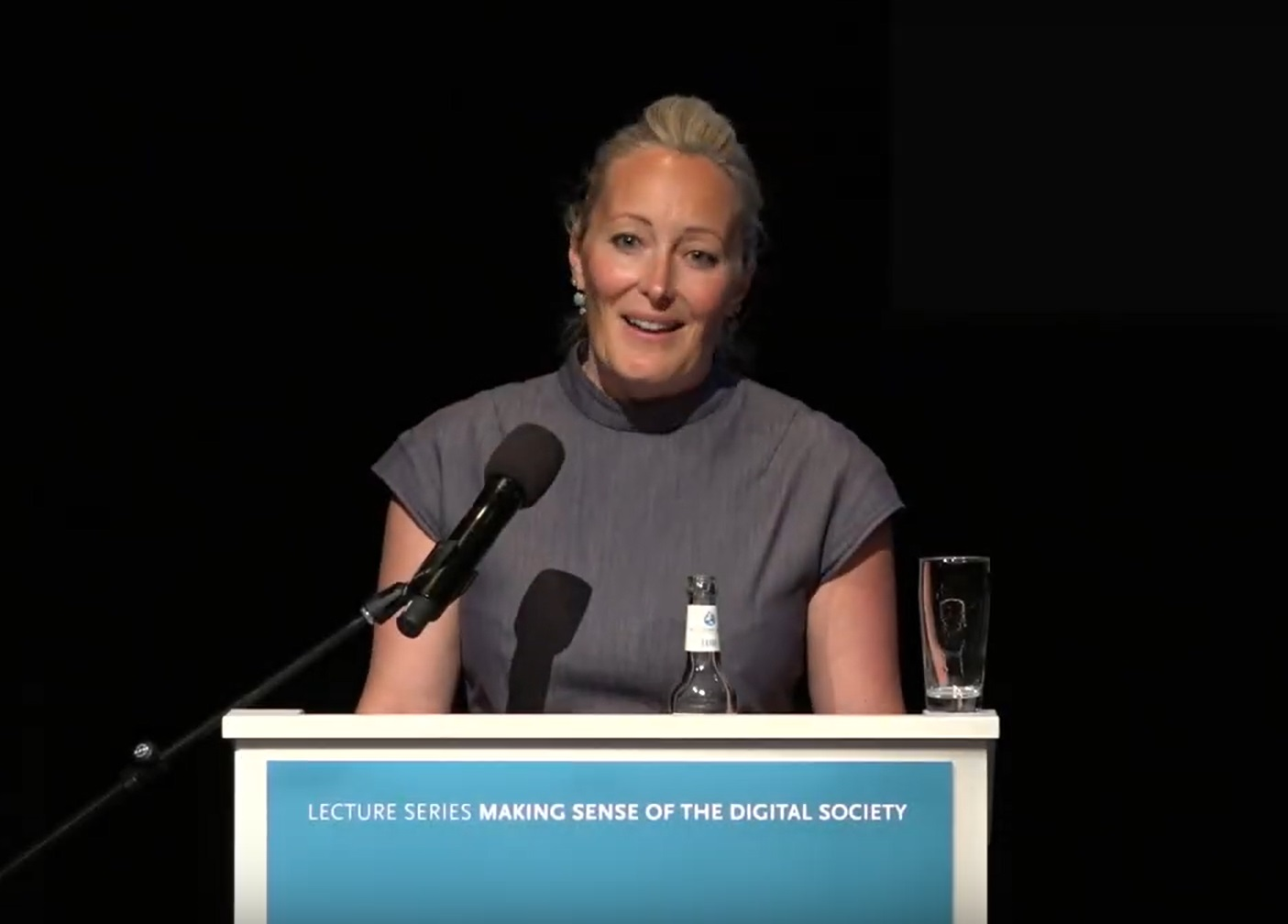
Prof Louise Amoore giving her lecture in the Making Sense of the Digital Society lecture series, 2019

HIIG develops formats for exchange between science, politics, business and civil society. According to its own description, in addition to its approach of interdisciplinarity, it also follows a philosophy of open science: it approaches stakeholders from politics and civil society with the results of its research. In addition to events and workshops, HIIG offers a platform for knowledge transfer through the Digital Society Blog and multimedia formats such as the Exploring Digital Spheres podcast.

Since 2012, the Digitaler Salon event series has been held once a month at the institute and is also broadcast via livestream. Here, experts from a wide range of fields discuss the effects of digitalisation on our society. Since the onset of the COVID-19 pandemic, the events have only been livestreamed. In 2020, HIIG researchers also launched the essay competition twentyforty, which resulted in a freely accessible publication and an exhibition. The institute also publishes the open access journal Internet Policy Review. It also runs channels on Facebook, Twitter, Instagram and YouTube.

In addition, HIIG organises academic conferences, e.g. the Association of Internet Researchers' AoIR 2016, workshops, talks and lecture series. In 2021, HIIG researchers were instrumental in the founding of the Platform Governance Research Network, which also saw the creation of the Platform Governance Archive – this makes major internet platforms' privacy statements and user agreements freely accessible.

In the Making Sense of the Digital Society event series launched in 2017, HIIG, together with the German Federal Agency for Civic Education (bpb), invites European thinkers to share their thoughts on the digital society and thus come to a better understanding of comprehensive transformation processes.

Speakers in the series have included:

- Manuel Castells
- Christoph Neuberger
- Elena Esposito
- Marion Fourcade
- Stephen Graham
- Nick Couldry
- Andreas Reckwitz
- Eva Illouz
- Dirk Baecker
- José van Dijck
- Louise Amoore
- Armin Nassehi
- Soshana Zuboff
- Sybille Krämer
- Philipp Staab
- Iyad Rahwan
- Jan-Werner Müller

== Publications ==
Researchers at HIIG publish publications with varying frequency as part of their research activities. A complete overview of publications can be found on the institute's website. HIIG releases some regular publications:

- The annual magazine encore, the institute's science magazine, including the Research Report, which provides an overview of the institute's research activities, publications and finances.
- The publication series Internet and Society (published by Mohr Siebeck Verlag, edited by Jeanette Hofmann, Matthias C. Kettemann, Björn Scheuermann, Thomas Schildhauer and Wolfgang Schulz).
- The peer-reviewed journal Internet Policy Review is published by HIIG.[22]
- The blog journal Elephant in the Lab is edited by HIIG researcher and programme director Benedikt Fecher.[23]

== Events and science communication ==
The Digital Salon has been held once a month at the institute since 2012 and is broadcast live in cooperation with Cooperative Berlin. In addition, HIIG organises scientific conferences, such as AoIR 2016 of the Association of Internet Researchers, workshops, talks and lecture series. In a series of events launched in 2017, HIIG together with the Federal Agency for Civic Education (bpb) invited “European thinkers” to share their thoughts on the digital society and thus gain a better understanding of comprehensive transformation processes.

HIIG develops various formats for the exchange between science, politics, business and civil society. In addition to numerous events and workshops, HIIG offers a platform for knowledge transfer through the Digital Society Blog and the podcast Exploring Digital Spheres.
