= Musiani =

Musiani is an Italian surname. Notable people with the surname include:

- Francesca Musiani, Italian author and scholar
- Lautaro Musiani (born 1996), Argentine cricketer
- Paola Musiani (1949–1985), Italian singer
