= David Kennedy (jurist) =

American academic and legal scholar (born 1954)

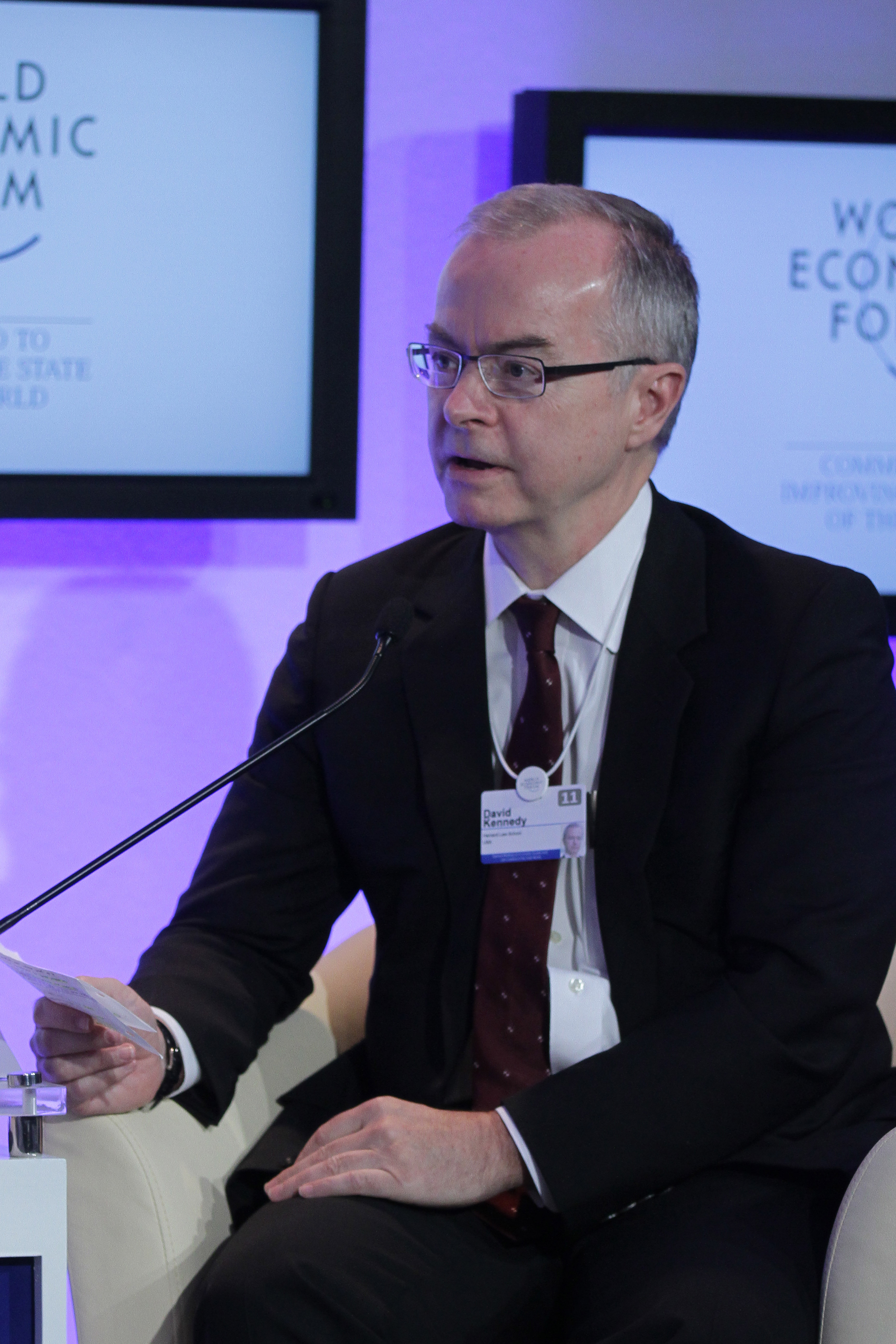
- Born: 1954 (age 71–72)
- Education: Brown University (BA); Tufts University (MA, PhD); Harvard University (JD)
- Scientific career
- Fields: International law
- Workplaces: Brown University

David W. Kennedy (born 1954) is an American academic and legal scholar known for his work on international law. As of 2017, he is the Manley Hudson Professor of Law at Harvard Law School, where he teaches the courses "Global Law and Governance", "Law and Economic Development" and "Expertise and Rulership in Law and Science". He has been a professor at Harvard Law School since 1981, although for a few years he held an appointment at Brown University, as Vice President International Affairs and the David and Marianna Fisher University Professor of International Relations.

== Life and career ==
David Kennedy obtained his B.A. from Brown University in 1976, graduating cum laude. In 1979 he completed a Master of Arts in Law and Diplomacy at the Fletcher School of Law and Diplomacy at Tufts University. He then attended Harvard Law School, where he graduated magna cum laude with a J.D. in 1980, after which he was admitted to the Bar in the District of Columbia. Kennedy returned to the Tufts and the Fletcher school to complete his doctoral studies, obtaining a PhD in international law and organizations, law and economic development in 1984.

In 1981 Kennedy took up a position as lecturer in Law at Harvard. Over the next 25 years Kennedy held a succession of academic appointments at Harvard, progressing through the academic ranks as assistant professor, professor, and faculty director. He is considered a leading figure in international law. He is well known for his article Challenging Expert Rule: The Politics of Global Governance.

He has worked for the United Nations, the European Commission and in private practice. Kennedy is also a member of Council on Foreign Relations, a position held since 2003.

Visiting professorships and scholarships held by Kennedy during his career include at Kiel and Hamburg universities (1980–81), SOAS, University of London, the University of Toronto (1998/99), University of Paris X, Nanterre (multiple appointments from 1995 to 2006), Australian National University (2000), University of Turin (2001/02) and the University of Freiburg (2007/08).

== Research and publications ==
He is one of the leaders of New Stream or New Approaches to International Law movement, which draws from Critical Legal Studies and other methodological sources to engage international law. His book Dark Sides of Virtue: Reassessing International Humanitarianism (2005) offers a critique of the international human rights movement and puts forward an alternative vision of global governance. In addition to dozens of articles on legal history and theory, Kennedy has authored several other books, most recently, The Canon of American Legal Thought (edited with William W. Fisher, 2006), Of War and Law (2006) and "A World of Struggle: How Power, Law, and Expertise Shape Global Political Economy" (2016).
