= Communia =

COMMUNIA is a thematic project funded by the European Commission within the eContentplus framework addressing theoretical analysis and strategic policy discussion of existing and emerging issues concerning the public domain in the digital environment - as well as related topics, including, but not limited to, alternative forms of licensing for creative material; open access to scientific publications and research results; management of works whose authors are unknown (i.e. orphan works).

COMMUNIA effort is aimed at helping to frame the general discourse on and around the public domain in the digital environment by highlighting the challenges arising from the increasingly complex interface between scientific progress, technological innovation, cultural development, socio-economic change on the one hand and the rise and mass deployment/usage of digital technologies in the European information society.

Coordinated by Juan Carlos De Martin of the Politecnico of Torino's NEXA Research Center for Internet and Society, COMMUNIA started its activities on 1 September 2007 and ended on 28 February 2011. The network includes 51 members (initially were 36) - universities, consumer organisations, libraries, archives, non-profit entities, etc. - mostly from the EU, but also from a few overseas countries, such as United States and Brazil, where similar policy discussions are underway.

Among its activities, COMMUNIA is organizing several workshops and three International conferences in EU countries, and will produce and disseminate a final strategic report. Under the title "Global Science and the Economics of Knowledge-Sharing Institutions", the Second COMMUNIA International Conference was held in June 2009 in Torino, Italy. The event addressed the conceptual foundations and practical feasibilities of contractually constructed “commons” and related bottom-up public domain initiatives (joint policy guidelines, common standards, institutional policies, etc.) capable of offering shared access to a variety of research resources, identifying models, needs and opportunities for effective initiatives across a diverse range of research areas. The third and final conference was held on 28–30 June 2010 in Torino, Italy, under the title of Universities & Cyberspace: Reshaping Knowledge Institutions for the Networked Age. In several sessions, workshops and keynote speeches, more than 200 attendees from all over the world discussed such issues as: What can universities contribute to the future of the internet? How can our educational institutions promote ideals of free exchange of information yet cope with the complex intellectual property challenges presented by the Net? Video-recordings, papers and other material related to the conference are fully available on the COMMUNIA website. Also, YouTube hosts several videos, including many video-interviews with Conference speakers.

Along with on-going activities of its five working groups (particularly finalized to the Project's Final Strategic Report), the COMMUNIA network co-hosted the Free Culture Research Conference (October 8–9, 2010) in Berlin.

The COMMUNIA network also drafted the Public Domain Manifesto, a document aimed at "reminding citizens and policy-makers of a common wealth that, since it belongs to all, it is often defended by no-one". The Manifesto has been signed by hundreds of individuals and organizations worldwide, and anybody can sign it.

Another initiative launched within the context of COMMUNIA is Public Domain Day: Every year on New Year's Day, due to the expiration of copyright protection terms on works produced by authors who died several decades earlier, thousands of works enter the public domain (differing in the various countries according to their copyright laws). Several events were also planned for January 1, 2011, to celebrate the role of the public domain in our societies.
