= Reynol Junco =

American psychologist

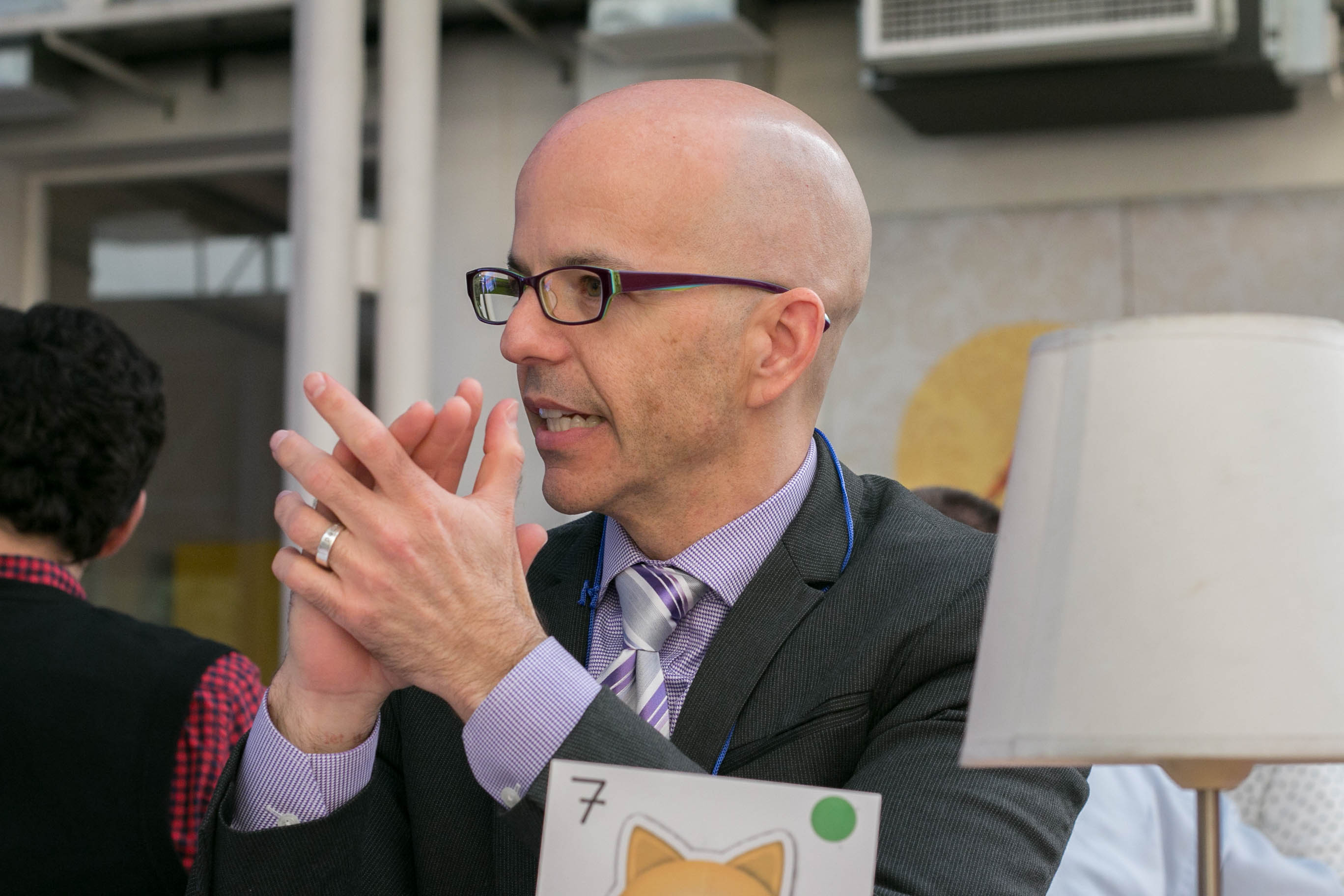
- Rey Junco in 2016
- Born: September 11, 1971 (age 54); Miami, Florida, United States
- Education: University of Florida; Penn State University; Harvard University
- Known for: Social media, psychology, statistics, education
- Scientific career
- Fields: Social Media; Psychology; Education
- Workplaces: Berkman Klein Center for Internet & Society

Reynol ("Rey") Junco (born September 11, 1971) is an American psychologist and education and social media researcher. He is known for his pioneering work on using social technologies in higher education. Rey is also known for his statistics, data science, and analytics skills. He is a former fellow at the Berkman Klein Center for Internet & Society at Harvard University. He is currently in private practice in Concord, Massachusetts.

== Biography ==
Reynol Junco was born of Cuban immigrants on September 11, 1971, in Miami, Florida.

Junco studied psychology at the University of Florida and graduated with a B.S. degree in 1994. He attended graduate school at the Pennsylvania State University and received a M.S. degree in clinical psychology in 1997 and a D.Ed. degree in counselor education in 2002.

== Research ==
Junco's prior research has examined the effects of the generational divide in higher education and investigated how various emerging technologies, especially social technologies, can be used to support and engage college students in their academic course work and psychosocial development, and improve the transitioning of first year students from high school to college. Most of his results are based on quantitative methods. Rey has focused his most recent work in the corporate sector on data science techniques, especially prediction and segmentation. He is a leader in the field of data analytics, which he uses to extract actionable insights for companies. Junco was an early pioneer in using data science techniques to analyze large and complex datasets in order to find "signal in the noise." He has worked with companies such as Hydrow focusing on analyzing product usage data to better understand customer behavior.

== Early work ==
=== Generational divide ===
In Junco and Mastrodicasa 2007, the first large multi-institution survey of student technology use in the U.S., Junco and his co-author studied various attributes of the Net Generation, especially the traits and behaviors related to their greater familiarity with the new technologies, as compared to previous generations which frequently include their college instructors.

Junco and Mastrodicasa also investigated the characteristics of the digital divide, the intra-generational differences with respect to the access to the technologies. They showed, among others, that students with higher incomes are more likely to use computers to conduct research, create projects, and analyze data than students with lower incomes. Junco, Merson and Salter 2010 showed that female gender, Caucasian race and higher income correlate positively with cell-phone ownership, while female gender, African-American race and higher income is positively predictive of the number of text messages sent and the number of time spent talking on cell phone per week.

=== Academic skills ===
One of Junco's main research goals has been to determine whether and how the new media can be harnessed to obtain pedagogical benefits and to improve academic success of university students, and whether those benefits outnumber the potentially detrimental effects of multitasking and the extent to which social media could be distracting to learning. Junco and Mastrodicasa 2007, Junco, Heiberger and Loken 2010 and Junco and Cotten 2010 report current findings.

=== Transferable skills ===
Junco has studied the use of social media for improving students' Transferable skills (non-academic skills such as communication and self-expression, team-working and creation of professional networks, self-confidence, leadership, planning and time management, experience with different points of view, etc.). In Junco and Timm 2008, the authors showed that blogs can be successfully used for improving students’ writing and marketing skills. The Twitter users that Junco and his co-workers studied in Junco, Heiberger and Loken 2010 became more extroverted when encouraged to communicate through social media and were more likely to ask questions in class. They were also more likely to meet outside class and become friends in real life than students who did not use Twitter.

=== Motivation ===
Junco's research has shown that the new technologies can be used to increase student attainment and engagement with academic course work and to improve retention (Junco and Timm 2008, Junco, Heiberger and Loken 2010).

=== Transitioning to college ===
Junco has also investigated how social media can be used to improve the transitioning of first year students from high school to college (Junco 2005).

=== Discussion ===
Most of Junco's work sides with the generation of the "digital natives" and recommends to close the existing gap in the use of technologies by introducing the new modalities and media into teaching, establishing student affairs and course blogs, wikis and chat rooms, adopting more experiential teaching methods and restructuring work environments to include multitasking skills and teamwork. Although some opponents have asked for a more balanced perspective and questioned whether the use of new technologies actually entails a positive qualitative change in learning, Junco's recent research (Junco, Heiberger and Loken 2010, the first controlled study of its kind) has shown that the use of social media such as Twitter in college classroom settings can significantly improve student performance. Even when social media is initially used more for information sharing that is not work-related, such use highlights the potential and benefits of the medium as a teaching tool. Other, related studies, support those findings.

== Notable work ==
- Junco, R. (2005). Technology and today’s first-year students. In M. L. Upcraft, J. N. Gardner, B. O. Barefoot and Associates (Eds.), Meeting challenges and building support: Creating a climate for first-year student success . San Francisco: Jossey-Bass, 221–238.
- Junco, R. and Mastrodicasa, J. (2007). Connecting to the Net.Generation: What higher education professionals need to know about today’s students. Washington, DC: NASPA.
- Junco, R. and Timm, D. (2008). Using emerging technologies to enhance student engagement. New directions for student services, 124. San Francisco: Jossey-Bass.
- Junco, R., Heiberger, G., and Loken, E. (2010). The effect of Twitter on college student engagement and grades. Journal of Computer Assisted Learning, 27(2), 119–132.
- Junco, R., Merson, D. and Salter, D. W. (2010). The effect of gender, ethnicity, and income on college students’ use of communication technologies. Cyberpsychology, Behavior, and Social Networking, 13(6), 619–627.

== Recognition ==
Hewlett Packard EdTech Innovators Award, Honorable Mention of Lock Haven University of Pennsylvania for using social media to improve student engagement and success, 2010.

== See also ==
- Facebook and higher education
- Digital native
- Networked learning
- Invisible College
