= Global Commission on Internet Governance =

Internet governance initiative

The Global Commission on Internet Governance, chaired by Carl Bildt and launched by two think tanks, the Canadian Centre for International Governance Innovation and UK-based Chatham House, was formed in January 2014 to make recommendations about the future of global internet governance. It is also considered one of the international initiatives that facilitate effective cooperation between relevant international actors, particularly according to the principles of internet governance.

== Activities ==
The Commission's research advisory network, led by Laura DeNardis, produces original research on Internet Governance topics such as the dark web, cybersecurity, and internet freedom. For instance, a research published in January 2017 entitled Who Runs the Internet? The Global Multi-stakeholder Model of Internet Governance described a "multistakeholder" framework wherein the management of the global internet architecture is in the hands of a cluster of international stakeholders such as industry, academic and non-governmental actors. There is a criticism from some countries against the current attempts at a multistakeholder process that cite how these appear to be led by Western nations.

== See also ==
- Internet Governance Forum
- Internet Technical Committee
- Internet Research Task Force
