= Dayo Olopade =

American non-fiction writer

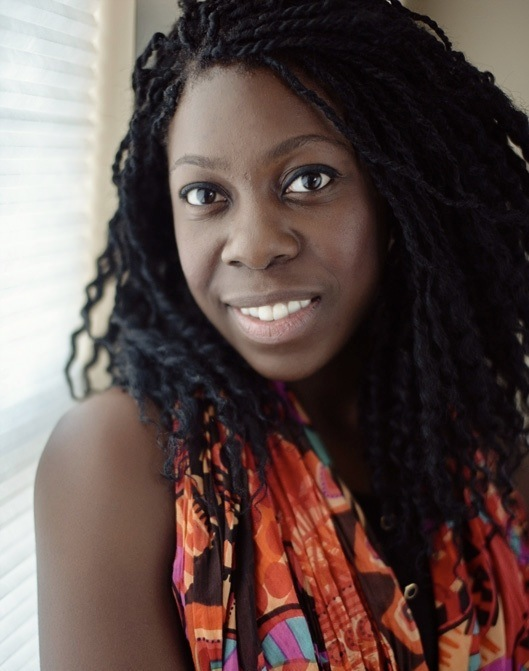
- Born: Temidayo Folasade Olopade; Chicago, Illinois, U.S.
- Education: Yale College; Yale School of Management; Yale Law School
- Spouse: Walter Lamberson
- Parent: Olufunmilayo Olopade (mother)
- Writing career
- Genre: Non-fiction
- Notable works: The Bright Continent: Breaking Rules and Making Change in Modern Africa.
- Literary movement: New America

Dayo Olopade is a Nigerian-American writer and lawyer and the author of The Bright Continent: Breaking Rules and Making Change in Modern Africa.

== Life ==
She was born and raised in Chicago to academic parents. She attended the University of Chicago Laboratory Schools and St. Paul's School before going to Yale College. She earned graduate degrees from Yale School of Management and Yale Law School, where she was a Knight Law and Media Scholar at the Yale Information Society Project, and a Yale World Fellow.

In 2009, she was named as a Bernard Schwartz Fellow at the New America Foundation. She has written essays, reviews and articles for publications like The Atlantic, The American Prospect, The Guardian, Foreign Policy, The New Republic, The New York Times, and The Washington Post.

In 2014, she published The Bright Continent, a book about African development and technology. She has written that "institutional failures accelerate the process of experimentation and problem solving." She has been a critic of governments across Africa, and former Liberian President Ellen Johnson-Sirleaf.

She was advisor to Andela, Safara, and Cancer IQ.

== Family ==
Her mother, Olufunmilayo Falusi Olopade, is a cancer researcher at the University of Chicago and recipient of the 2005 "Genius Grant" from the John D. and Catherine T. MacArthur Foundation, where she is also on the board. In 2016, she married Walter Lamberson.

== Works ==
- The bright continent : breaking rules and making change in modern Africa, Boston; New York : Mariner Books Houghton Mifflin Harcourt, 2014. ISBN 9780547678313, OCLC 951136131
