= Michael Zimmer (academic) =

American privacy and data ethics scholar

- Education: University of Notre Dame (B.B.A. Marketing, 1994); New York University (M.A. Media Ecology, 2002); New York University (Ph.D. Media, Culture and Communication, 2007)
- Scientific career
- Fields: privacy, internet ethics, data ethics, internet research ethics, social computing
- Workplaces: University of Wisconsin-Milwaukee (2008-2019); Marquette University (2019-present)
- Website: michaelzimmer.org

Michael Zimmer is a privacy and data ethics scholar. He currently is a professor in the Department of Computer Science at Marquette University and Director of the Center for Data, Ethics, and Society. Previously, he was on the faculty at the School of Information Studies at the University of Wisconsin–Milwaukee, and director of the Center for Information Policy Research. Zimmer is on the advisory board of the Future of Privacy Forum, and was on the executive committee of the Association of Internet Researchers from 2009-2016. He was the Microsoft Resident Fellow at the Information Society Project at Yale Law School from 2007-2008.

Zimmer has criticized the research ethics of a Harvard-sponsored research project that harvested the Facebook profiles of an entire cohort of undergraduate students. He has appeared on the National Public Radio shows Science Friday and Morning Edition. Zimmer appeared in the "Is My Cellphone Spying On Me?" commentary accompanying the DVD release of Eagle Eye

On October 25, 2013, Zimmer announced "The Zuckerberg Files", a digital archive of all the public utterances of Facebook's founder and CEO, Mark Zuckerberg. Zimmer published a critique of Zuckerberg in The Washington Post to commemorate Facebook's 10th anniversary. In 2021, Zimmer was named among experts advising Gizmodo regarding the release of The Facebook Papers

== Selected publications ==
- Internet Research Ethics for the Social Age: New Challenges, Cases, and Contexts, Peter Lang, 2017 ISBN 978-1433142666
