= Tamar Frankel =

Israeli legal scholar (born 1925)

Tamar Frankel (born July 4, 1925, in Tel Aviv) has been a professor of law at Boston University School of Law since 1968.

Her areas of scholarship include financial system regulation, fiduciary law, corporate governance, the Internet, and Space Law. A native of Israel, she has taught at Oxford University, Tokyo University, and lectured in Geneva and Kuala Lumpur, Malaysia, and has consulted with the People's Bank of China. She has been a Faculty Fellow at the Berkman Center for Internet and Society, and was a guest scholar at the Brookings Institution in Washington, D.C. In addition, she has taught at Harvard Law School and Harvard Business School; she has also lectured at Switzerland and Canada.

In 1998, Professor Frankel was instrumental in the establishment and corporate structure of the Internet Corporation for Names and Numbers (ICANN).

Professor Frankel is a frequent contributor to the Justia Verdict blog.

She earned an LLM and SJD from Harvard Law School.

== Her Books ==
1. The Ponzi Scheme Puzzle: A History and Analysis of Con Artists and Victims,

2. Fiduciary Law,

3. Trust and Honesty: America’s Business Culture at a Crossroad,

4. Investment Management Regulation,

5. Securitization,

6. The Regulation of Money Managers.

== Personal life ==
She is married to Ray Atkins and they have two children, six grandchildren and two great-grandchildren.
