= Neubot =

- Developers: Nexa Center for Internet and Society, Simone Basso
- Stable release: 0.4.16.9 / October 30, 2013; 12 years ago
- Written in: Python
- Operating system: Cross-platform
- Type: Internet bot
- License: GPL
- Website: neubot.org
- Repository: github.com/neubot/neubot

Neubot (the network neutrality bot) is a free software Internet bot, developed and maintained by the Nexa Center for Internet and Society, that gathers network performance data useful to investigate network neutrality.

== Description ==
Once installed on the user's computer, it runs in the background and periodically performs active transmission tests with servers hosted by the distributed Measurement Lab server platform (and, in future, with other instances of the software itself). These transmission tests measure end-to-end network performance emulating different protocols (currently HTTP and BitTorrent) as well as transmitting and receiving "raw" data over TCP. Performance are measured at application level as well as at TCP level (using Web100). Measurements results are saved both locally (where a localhost-only web user interface allows users to browse them) and on Measurement Lab servers. They are collected for research purposes and automatically published on the web under Creative Commons Zero (public domain) allowing anyone to re-use them freely for the same purpose.
