= Olufunmilayo Olopade =

Nigerian physician (born 1957)

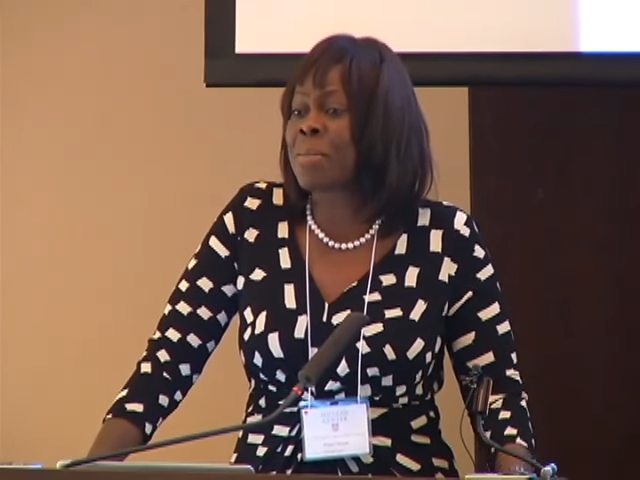
- Olopade in 2012
- Born: 1957 (age 68–69); Nigeria
- Education: University of Ibadan
- Spouse: Christopher Sola Olopade
- Children: Dayo Olopade
- Medical career
- Field: Hematology
- Institutions: University of Chicago
- Sub-specialties: Oncology
- Research: BRCA1 and BRCA2 genes
- Awards: MacArthur Fellows Program, Villanova University Mendel Medal, Four Freedoms Award

Olufunmilayo I. Olopade born in the year 1957, is a Nigerian hematology oncologist, Associate Dean for Global Health and Walter L. Palmer, Distinguished Service Professor in Medicine and Human Genetics at the University of Chicago. She also serves as director of the University of Chicago Hospital's Cancer Risk Clinic.

== Life ==
Olufunmilayo Olopade was born in Nigeria in 1957 and was the fifth of six children born to an Anglican musician.

She attended St Anne's School in Ibadan for her secondary school education. Olopade first expressed her interest in becoming a doctor at a young age because the Nigerian villages were scarce for doctors and medical resources which were both in high demand.

She graduated from the University of Ibadan in Nigeria with an MBBS in 1980.

She works closely with the Breast Cancer Research Foundation and has performed extensive clinical work surrounding the role of the BRCA1 and BRCA2 genes in the incidence of breast cancer in women of African descent.

She is a member of the American Association for Cancer Research, the American College of Physicians, the Nigerian Medical Association, the American Philosophical Society, and the Institute of Medicine.

== Early career ==
Olufunmilayo started her career in 1980 as a medical officer in the Nigerian Navy Hospital. She moved to the US in 1983 and worked at Cook County Hospital in Chicago until 1987. In 1991, Olufunmilayo joined the University of Chicago as an assistant professor in hematology and oncology, Dean of Global Health, and Director of the Center for Clinical Cancer Genetics at the University of Chicago.

== Awards ==
- 1975: Nigerian Federal Government Merit Award
- 1978: Nigerian Medical Association Award for Excellence in Pediatrics
- 1980: Nigerian Medical Association Award for Excellence in Medicine
- 1990: Ellen Ruth Lebow Fellowship
- 1991: American Society for Clinical Oncology Young Investigator Award
- 1992: James S. McDonnell Foundation Scholar Award
- 2000:Doris Duke Distinguished Clinical Scientist Award
- 2003: Phenomenal Woman Award for work within the African-American Community
- 2005: Access Community Network's Heroes in Healthcare Award
- 2005 MacArthur Fellows Program
- 2015: Four Freedoms Award
- 2017: Villanova University Mendel Medal
- On Saturday, May 18, 2019, The Lincoln Academy of Illinois granted Olopade the Order of Lincoln award, the highest honor bestowed by the State of Illinois.
- 2021: Member of the U. S. National Academy of Sciences.

=== MacArthur Fellows Program ===
Olufunmilayo Olopade was one of the three African-Americans to receive the $500,000 award. This award was appointed by John D. and Catherine T. MacArthur Foundation. This "no strings attached" stipend grant was given as support for up to five years and was referred to as the "genius grant." This grant allowed Olopade to continue her research on her groundbreaking discoveries on diseases and health concerns.

== Family ==
In 1983, she married Christopher Sola Olopade who is also a physician at the University of Chicago. They have two daughters, including journalist Dayo Olopade, and one son.

== Research ==
Most of her research was on the susceptibility to cancer which would then be used to adopt a more effective way of treating breast cancer among the African and African-American individuals and populations.

In 1987 at the University of Chicago, she found a gene that helped suppress tumor growth.

In 1992, Olopade helped found the University of Chicago's Center for Clinical Cancer Genetics. Here, she found that African-American women often developed breast cancer at younger ages than white women.

In 2003, she began a new study looking at breast cancer and genetics from African women from Nigeria to Senegal and also African-American women in Chicago. By 2005, she found that 80% of tumors in African women did not need estrogen to grow compared to 20% of tumors in the Caucasian women. She also found that this was due to a different pattern of gene expression between the African women and the Caucasian women.
