= Jack Balkin =

American legal scholar

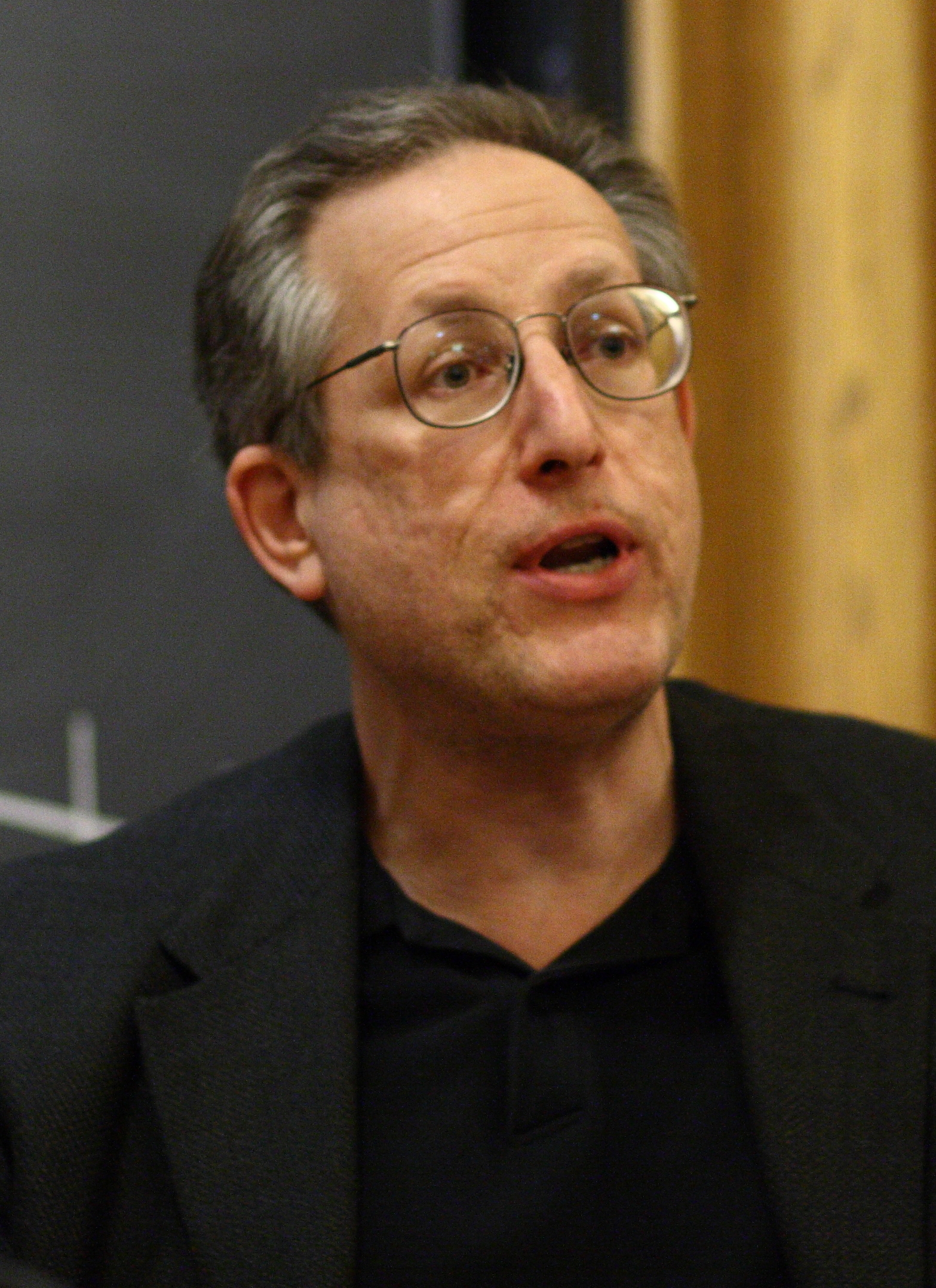
- Born: August 13, 1956 (age 70); Kansas City, Missouri, U.S.

Academic background
- Education: Harvard University (BA, JD); University of Cambridge (PhD)

Academic work
- Discipline: Constitutional law
- Institutions: Yale University

Jack M. Balkin (born August 13, 1956) is an American legal scholar. He is the Knight Professor of Constitutional Law and the First Amendment at Yale Law School. Balkin is the founder and director of the Yale Information Society Project (ISP), a research center whose mission is "to study the implications of the Internet, telecommunications, and the new information technologies for law and society." He also directs the Knight Law and Media Program and the Abrams Institute for Free Expression at Yale Law School.

Balkin publishes a legal blog, Balkinization, and is also a correspondent for The Atlantic. He is a scholar of Constitutional and First Amendment law. In addition to his work as a legal scholar, he has also written a book on memes and cultural evolution and has translated and written a commentary on the ancient Chinese Book of Changes, or I Ching.

== Biography ==
Born in Kansas City, Missouri, Balkin received his A.B. and J.D. degrees from Harvard University in 1978 and 1981, respectively, and his Ph.D. in philosophy from the University of Cambridge in 1995. He clerked for Judge Carolyn Dineen King of the Fifth Circuit Court of Appeals. From 1982 to 1984 he was a litigation associate at the law firm Cravath, Swaine & Moore. He taught at the University of Missouri–Kansas City School of Law from 1984 to 1988 and at the University of Texas from 1988 to 1994. He joined the Yale faculty in 1994. He has also taught at Harvard University, New York University, Tel Aviv University, and Queen Mary College at the University of London. He was elected a Fellow of the American Academy of Arts and Sciences in 2005, and a Member of the American Law Institute in 2020.

== Memetics, ideology, and transcendence ==
Balkin's 1998 book, Cultural Software: A Theory of Ideology, argued that ideology could be explained in terms of memes and processes of cultural evolution. He argued that ideology is an effect of the "cultural software" or tools of understanding that become part of human beings and that are produced through the evolution and transmission of memes. At the same time, Balkin argued that all ideological and moral analysis presupposes a transcendent ideal of truth and "a transcendent value of justice." Like T. K. Seung, he suggests that a transcendent idea of justice—although incapable of perfect realization and inevitably "indeterminate"—underlies political discourse and political persuasion.

== Ideological drift, nested oppositions, and legal semiotics ==
Balkin coined the term ideological drift to describe a phenomenon by which ideas and concepts change their political valence as they are introduced into new social and political contexts over time. Along with Duncan Kennedy, Balkin developed the field of legal semiotics. Legal semiotics shows how legal arguments feature recurrent tropes or topoi that respond to each other and whose opposition is reproduced at higher and lower levels of doctrinal detail as legal doctrines evolve. Hence Balkin claimed that legal argument has a self-similar "crystalline" or fractal structure.

Balkin employed deconstruction and related literary theories to argue that legal thought was structured in terms of "nested oppositions"—opposed ideas or concepts that turn into each other over time or otherwise depend on each other in novel and unexpected ways. Although he draws on literary theory in his work on legal rhetoric, Balkin and his frequent co-author Sanford Levinson contend law is best analogized not to literature but to the performing arts such as music and drama.

== Partisan entrenchment ==
Balkin and Levinson argue that constitutional revolutions in judicial doctrine occur through a process called partisan entrenchment. The party that controls the White House can stock the federal courts with new judges and Justices who have views on key constitutional issues roughly similar to those of the President. This shifts the median Justice on the Supreme Court and changes the complexion of the lower federal courts, which, in turn, eventually affects constitutional doctrine. If enough new judges are appointed in a relatively short period of time, changes will occur more quickly, producing a constitutional revolution. For example, a constitutional revolution occurred following the New Deal because Franklin Roosevelt was able to appoint eight new Supreme Court Justices between 1937 and 1941. Balkin and Levinson's theory contrasts with Bruce Ackerman's theory of constitutional moments, which argues that constitutional revolutions occur because of self-conscious acts of democratic mobilization that establish new standards of political legitimacy. Balkin and Levinson view partisan entrenchment as roughly but imperfectly democratic; it guarantees neither legitimate nor correct constitutional interpretation.

== Constitutional interpretation ==
Balkin's constitutional theory, developed in his 2011 book, Living Originalism, is both originalist and living constitutionalist. He argues that there is no contradiction between these approaches, properly understood. Interpreters must follow the original meaning of the constitutional text but not its original expected application; hence much constitutional interpretation actually involves constitutional construction and state building by all three branches of government. Balkin's "framework originalism" views the Constitution as an initial framework for governance that sets politics in motion and makes politics possible; it must be filled out over time through constitutional construction and state building. This process of building out the Constitution is living constitutionalism.

== Constitutional rot ==
Balkin uses the term "constitutional rot" to describe the process by which democracies become less responsive to public will and less devoted to the public good over time. Constitutional rot grows because of (1) increasing inequalities of income and wealth; (2) increasing political polarization and tribalism; (3) loss of trust between members of different parties and between the public and established institutions; and (4) policy disasters that show that government officials are not competent and/or cannot be trusted. Balkin argues that the framers of the U.S. Constitution believed that all republics would decay over time, and they designed the Constitution so that it could ride out periods of constitutional rot in the hopes of a later renewal of republican institutions. Many of the Constitution's features, including staggered terms for the President, House, and Senate, separation of powers, federalism, and an independent judiciary, are forms of "republican insurance" designed to achieve this goal.

Balkin distinguishes constitutional rot from constitutional crisis. Constitutional crisis is a period in which people reasonably believe that constitutional institutions are about to fail or have failed. Because a key purpose of constitutions is to make politics possible, constitutions fail when people no longer try to struggle for power within the terms of the constitution. This may result in political paralysis, or in civil war, insurrections, secession, or attempted coups. Although the two concepts of crisis and rot are distinct, Balkin argues that an advanced case of constitutional rot can generate a constitutional crisis.

== Constitutional crisis ==
Balkin and Levinson offer a typology of constitutional crises. In Type One crises, political actors publicly announce that they will no longer abide by the constitution and disobey direct judicial orders. In Type Two crises, fidelity to the constitution leads to disaster, because people think that the Constitution prevents them from acting or because they believe that the Constitution does not provide for a certain event so that paralysis occurs and disaster strikes. In a Type Three crisis, people disagree so strongly about what the constitution means that they turn to civil war, secession, or insurrection. Balkin and Levinson believe real constitutional crises are rare in American history, although political crises are frequent. A test of a successful constitution is whether it can successfully manage and resolve political crises within its boundaries.

== Constitutional cycles ==
Balkin argues that America's constitutional system evolves through the interplay between three cycles: the rise and fall of dominant political parties, the waxing and waning of political polarization, and alternating episodes of constitutional rot and constitutional renewal. Balkin explains that America's politics seems especially fraught because America is nearing the end of the Republican Party's long political dominance, is at the height of a long cycle of political polarization, and is suffering from an advanced case of constitutional rot. Balkin argues that America is in a Second Gilded Age, and predicts that it is slowly moving toward a second Progressive Era.

== Freedom of speech and democratic culture ==
Balkin's work on the First Amendment argues that the purpose of the free speech principle is to promote what he calls a democratic culture. The idea of democratic culture is broader than a concern with democratic deliberation or democratic self-government, and emphasizes individual freedom, cultural participation and mutual influence. A democratic culture is one in which ordinary individuals can participate in the forms of culture that in turn help shape and constitute them as persons. Balkin argues that free speech on the Internet is characterized by two features: "routing around" media gatekeepers, and "glomming on"—non-exclusive appropriation of cultural content that is melded with other sources to create new forms of culture. These distinctive features of Internet speech, he argues, are actually features of speech in general and thus lead to a focus on democratic participation in culture.

Balkin argues that protection of freedom of speech in the digital age will increasingly rely less on judge-made doctrines of the First Amendment and more on legislation, administrative regulation, and technological design. He argues that we have moved beyond the traditional dyadic model of free expression in which nation states regulated the speech of their citizens. Instead, digital speech involves a pluralist model. In the pluralist model, territorial governments continue to regulate speech directly. But they also attempt to coerce or co-opt owners of digital infrastructure to regulate the speech of others. This is "new school" speech regulation. Digital infrastructure owners, and especially social media companies, now act as private governors of speech communities, creating and enforcing various rules and norms of the communities they govern. Finally, end users, civil society organizations, hackers, and other private actors repeatedly put pressure on digital infrastructure companies to regulate speech in certain ways and not to regulate it in others. This triangular tug of war—rather than the traditional dyadic model of states regulating the speech of private parties—characterizes the practical ability to speak in the algorithmic society.

== The National Surveillance State ==
In a 2006 essay with Levinson, and a 2008 article, Balkin discusses the emergence of a "National Surveillance State" that uses the collection, collation and analysis of information to govern. The National Surveillance State is a natural byproduct of technological development and demands for government services. Balkin argues that "[t]he question is not whether we will have a surveillance state in the years to come, but what sort of surveillance state we will have."

Balkin distinguishes between two models: an authoritarian information state and a democratic information state. Authoritarian information states are information misers and information gluttons: they collect as much information as possible and they resist sharing it or making their own operations public. Democratic information states are information gourmets and information philanthropists: they collect only what they need, they produce information for and share information with their citizens and they make their own operations democratically accountable. Democratic information states also destroy government collected information when it is no longer necessary. In practice, much privacy protection came from the fact that people forgot what had happened. But in the digital age, nothing is ever forgotten, so appropriate discarding of the results of government surveillance must be mandated.

As the surveillance state grows, Balkin argues, new civil liberties protections are necessary, just as they were necessary with the growth of the administrative state after the New Deal and the National Security State after World War II. The executive branch must be redesigned with internal checks and balances to police itself, to report on its activities, and to prevent abuse. Finally, technology must be used to record what officials do and look for signs of government misconduct: "The best way to control the watchers is to watch them as well."

== Information fiduciaries, robotics, and artificial intelligence ==
Balkin coined the term "information fiduciary" to describe the legal and ethical obligations of digital businesses and social media companies. He argues that people must trust and depend on certain digital businesses and social media companies, and are especially vulnerable to them. Therefore, the digital age has produced a new kind of fiduciary obligation analogous to those the law imposes on money managers and on professionals like doctors, lawyers, and accountants.

Balkin argues that digital information fiduciaries must act in a trustworthy fashion toward their end-users. They must respect end-user privacy and may not manipulate end-users. Those who develop and employ robots, artificial intelligence agents, and algorithms may also be information fiduciaries toward their customers and end-users. In addition, firms may not engage in "algorithmic nuisance": using people's digital identities to discriminate and manipulate them and shifting the costs of algorithmic decision making onto the general public.

Balkin argues that the obligations of information fiduciaries and the duty not to be algorithmic nuisances are part of new laws of robotics. Unlike Asimov's famous three laws of robotics, these laws are directed not to robots but to the people and organizations who design, own, and operate them. Balkin argues that robotic and artificial intelligence technologies mediate relationships of power between different groups of people; therefore law must focus on regulating the people, firms, and social groups who use robots and artificial intelligence as much as on the technologies themselves.

== Selected works ==
=== As author ===
- Balkin, J. M. (2024). Memory and Authority: The Uses of History in Constitutional Interpretation. New Haven: Yale University Press. ISBN 978-0300272222. OCLC 1411516246.
- Balkin, J. M. (2020). The cycles of constitutional time. New York: Oxford University Press. ISBN 978-0-19-753101-3. OCLC 1140362306.
- Levinson, Sanford; Balkin, J. M. (2019). Democracy and dysfunction. Chicago: The University of Chicago Press. ISBN 978-0-226-61199-0.
- Balkin, J. M. (2011). Living originalism. Cambridge, MA: Belknap Press of Harvard University Press. ISBN 978-0-674-06178-1. OCLC 709670308.
- Balkin, J. M. (2011). Constitutional redemption: political faith in an unjust world. Cambridge, MA: Harvard University Press. ISBN 978-0-674-05874-3. OCLC 676725392.
- Balkin, J. M. (2002). The laws of change: I ching and the philosophy of life (1st ed.). New York: Schocken Books. ISBN 978-0-8052-4199-0.
- Balkin, Jack M. (1998). Cultural software: a theory of ideology. New Haven, CT: Yale Univ. Press. ISBN 978-0-300-08450-4.

=== As editor ===
- Levinson, Sanford; Balkin, Jack M.; Amar, Akhil; Siegel, Reva; Rodriguez, Cristina, eds. (2026). Processes of Constitutional Decisionmaking (9th ed.). Aspen Publications. ISBN 979-8899649585.
- Balkin, Jack M., ed. (2023). What Roe v. Wade Should Have Said (Revised ed.). NYU Press. ISBN 978-1479823109.
- Balkin, Jack M., ed. (2020). What Obergefell v. Hodges Should Have Said. Yale University Press. ISBN 978-0300221558.
- Balkin, Jack M.; Siegel, Reva B., eds. (2009). The Constitution in 2020. Oxford University Press. ISBN 978-0-19-538796-4.
- Balkin, Jack M.; Grimmelmann, James; Katz, Eddan; Kozlovski, Nimrod; Wagman, Shlomit; Zalsky, Tal, eds. (2007). Cybercrime: Digital Cops in a Networked Environment. NYU Press. ISBN 978-0-8147-9983-3.
- Balkin, Jack M.; Noveck, Beth Simone, eds. (2006). The State of Play: Law, Games, and Virtual Worlds. NYU Press. ISBN 0-8147-9972-8.
- Balkin, Jack M., ed. (2001). What Brown v. Board of Education Should Have Said. NYU Press. ISBN 0-8147-9890-X.
- Balkin, J. M.; Levinson, Sanford, eds. (2000). Legal Canons. NYU Press. ISBN 0-8147-9857-8.

=== Journal articles ===
- Balkin, Jack M. (2017). "Constitutional Crisis and Constitutional Rot". Maryland L. Rev. 77: 147–160.
- Balkin, Jack M. (2013). "Verdi's High C". Tex. L. Rev. 91: 1687–1709.
- Balkin, Jack M.; Levinson, Sanford (November 2012). "The dangerous Thirteenth Amendment". Columbia Law Review. 112 (7): 1459–1499. JSTOR 41708156. Archived from the original on November 17, 2015.
- Levinson, Sanford; Balkin, Jack M. (2009). "Constitutional Crises". U. Pa. L. Rev. 157: 707–753.
- Balkin, Jack M. (2008). "The Constitution in the National Surveillance State" (PDF). Minnesota Law Review. 93: 1–25. doi:10.24926/265535.1421. SSRN 1141524.

== See also ==
- List of thinkers influenced by deconstruction
