= Openlaw =

Openlaw is a project at the Berkman Klein Center for Internet & Society at Harvard Law School aimed at releasing case arguments under a copyleft license, in order to encourage public suggestions for improvement.

Berkman lawyers specialise in cyberlaw—hacking, copyright, encryption and so on—and the centre has strong ties with the EFF and the open source software community. In 1998 faculty member Lawrence Lessig, now at Stanford Law School, was asked by online publisher Eldritch Press to mount a legal challenge to US copyright law. Eldritch takes books whose copyright has expired and publishes them on the Web, but legislation called the Sonny Bono Copyright Term Extension Act extended copyright from 50 to 70 years after the author's death, cutting off its supply of new material. Lessig invited law students at Harvard and elsewhere to help craft legal arguments challenging the new law on an online forum, which evolved into Openlaw.

Normal law firms write arguments the way commercial software companies write code. Lawyers discuss a case behind closed doors, and although their final product is released in court, the discussions or "source code" that produced it remain secret. In contrast, Openlaw crafts its arguments in public and releases them under a copyleft license. "We deliberately used free software as a model," said Wendy Seltzer, who took over Openlaw when Lessig moved to Stanford. Around 50 legal scholars worked on Eldritch's case, and Openlaw has taken other cases, too.

"The gains are much the same as for software," Seltzer says. "Hundreds of people scrutinise the 'code' for bugs, and make suggestions how to fix it. And people will take underdeveloped parts of the argument, work on them, then patch them in." Armed with arguments crafted in this way, Openlaw took Eldritch's case—deemed unwinnable at the outset—right through the system to the Supreme Court. The case, Eldred v. Ashcroft, lost in 2003.

Among the drawbacks to this approach: the arguments are made in public from the start, so Openlaw can't spring a surprise in court. Nor can it take on cases where confidentiality is important. But where there's a strong public interest element, open sourcing has big advantages. Citizens' rights groups, for example, have taken parts of Openlaw's legal arguments and used them elsewhere. "People use them on letters to Congress, or put them on flyers," Seltzer says.
