= John Henry Clippinger =

American artificial intelligence researcher

John Henry Clippinger III is a researcher, entrepreneur, and activist around decentralized, autonomous, self-organizing systems with a focus on generative governance and finance for climate change and social equity.

He is the author of A Crowd of One: The Future of Individual Identity (Perseus, Public Affairs, 2007) and a number of other books and publications. He edited The Biology of Business: Decoding the Natural Laws of Enterprises (Jossey Bass, 1998), contributed to The Reputation Society: How Online Opinions Are Reshaping The Offline World, and co-edited (with David Bollier) From Bitcoin to Burning Man and Beyond: The Quest for Identity and Autonomy in a Digital Society.

He contributed to the "A Renaissance of the Commons: How the New Sciences and Internet are Framing a New Global Identity and Order" chapter in Code: Collaboration, Ownership and the Digital Economy (Cambridge, Mass.: MIT Press.2009) Social Physics, Designing New Social Institutions (The Center for Natural and Social Science, Chinese Academy of Science, Beijing China, September; 2007), On Protecting One's Good Name: An Inquiry into Effective Reputation and Rating Systems, in 'Hassan Masum, (Mark Tovey, editors, Digital Innovation in Governance: New Rules for Sharing and Protecting Private Information, and with the Kauffman Task Force on Law, Innovation, and Growth, Rules for Growth; Promoting Innovation and Growth Through Legal Reform, p. 381-407, 2011, Marion Kauffman Foundation.

He is a contributor to Techonomy.com, and The American Banker.

== Early life ==
John Henry Clippinger Jr. was born in Cincinnati, Ohio. to John and Jane Clippinger. His father was a former prosecutor of Prohibition Era gangsters, and a senior partner at Taft Stettinius and Hollister, where he was active in civic affairs, Republican politics, competitive timber racing and show jumping, Master of the Camargo Hunt, and a close associate of Sen. Robert A. Taft. John attended Walnut Hills High School and Taft School, Watertown, Connecticut. He had two sisters Sarah and Jane Judith, both now deceased. His great-grandfather, Rev. John Henry Clippinger, was a circuit minister and Abolitionist, and his grandfather, a lawyer, oilman in Texas, and real estate developer.

He graduated from Yale University, where he was active in the early civil rights, social activism and anti-war groups After his freshman year, he worked for a Dr. James Turpin with Project Concern in clinics in the “Walled City” of Hong Kong and with refugee Chinese boat people. On March 9, 1965, he was among a small group of white students to participate in the Selma, Alabama “Turnaround Tuesday” March over the Edmund Pettus Bridge. In the same year, he became president of ARFEP (Americans for Reappraisal of Far Eastern Policy) founded with William Sloan Coffin as the first university opposition to the Vietnam War. He worked with John Fairbanks of Harvard and Congressman Allard Lowenstein to sponsor the first full-page New York Times petition against the United States China and Vietnam war policy. He was also active in the 1963 March on Washington for Jobs and Freedom and a marshal for the 1967 Vietnam Protest march. He was Social Chairman of St. Anthony Hall, Aurelian Honor Society and completed his Anthropology honors thesis, “Steersman and the Stars: A Cybernetic Analysis of Myth.”

== Career ==
Clippinger studied cybernetics and information theory at the University of Pennsylvania's Annenberg School, where he completed a master's thesis on computer simulations of adaptation strategies in self-organizing symbolic systems. While in graduate school in Philadelphia, he worked with community organizations including the Black Panther Party's breakfast program and the Young Lords on youth violence mitigation initiatives. He later entered the doctoral program at the University of Pennsylvania, focusing on content analysis, computational linguistics, and artificial intelligence. During this period he worked as a research associate at Brandeis University's Florence Heller School for Social Policy and Management, applying systems theory and simulation models to the design of human services. From 1972 to 1975 he conducted doctoral research at the MIT Artificial Intelligence Laboratory with Terry Winograd. His work was later published as Meaning and Discourse: A Computational Model of Psychoanalytic Cognition and Discourse (1979).

From 1976 to 1979 he was a research fellow at Harvard University's Information Resources Policy Program, working with Anthony G. Oettinger on issues related to telecommunications policy, cross-border data flows, and information privacy. Between 1978 and 1980 he served as an expert adviser during the formation of the U.S. National Telecommunications and Information Administration. In 1980 Clippinger founded Brattle Research Corporation, an early natural language processing software company. After its sale, he joined Coopers & Lybrand as Director of Intellectual Capital, where he developed an automated semantic classification system known as CLIPS (Coopers & Lybrand Intellectual Property Service). He later founded several additional technology ventures and served as a consultant to the U.S. Department of Defense's Command and Control Research Program.

Clippinger later became a senior fellow at the Berkman Center for Internet & Society at Harvard Law School, where he founded the Social Physics project and helped establish Project Higgins, an initiative focused on user control of personal data. He is a co-founder and executive director of the Institute for Innovation and Data-Driven Design (ID3), a nonprofit organization focused on digital trust frameworks and decentralized data systems, and has been affiliated with the City Science group at the MIT Media Lab.

== Affiliations ==
Clippinger has been a member of the World Economic Forum Global Advisory Council, the Risk Analysis Network for the World Economic Forum, The Highlands Forum The Santa Fe Institute, Aspen Institute, and others according to his biography page at the Aspen Institute. John Clippinger is currently the co-director of the Law Lab - the Berkman Center Internet & Society, Harvard. He is also a core member of City Science group at MIT Media Lab.

He was a delegate of the E-G8 Forum, participated in the Creative Leadership Summit, Fortune Brainstorm, a contributor to Massachusetts Institute of Technology Mobile Territorial Labs, Monaco Media Forum, and Ashoka.
