= Marion Fourcade =

French-American sociologist

Marion Fourcade is a French sociologist. She is Professor of Sociology at the University of California, Berkeley. She is known for her work on the sociology and history of the field of economics, as well as her work on digital society and digital economy.

In 2019, she gave the annual British Journal of Sociology lecture, which was on the topic of ordinal citizenship. In 2021, the British Journal of Sociology devoted a special issue to her work.

In 2000, she completed her PhD from Harvard University.
