= Laura DeNardis =

American author and scholar

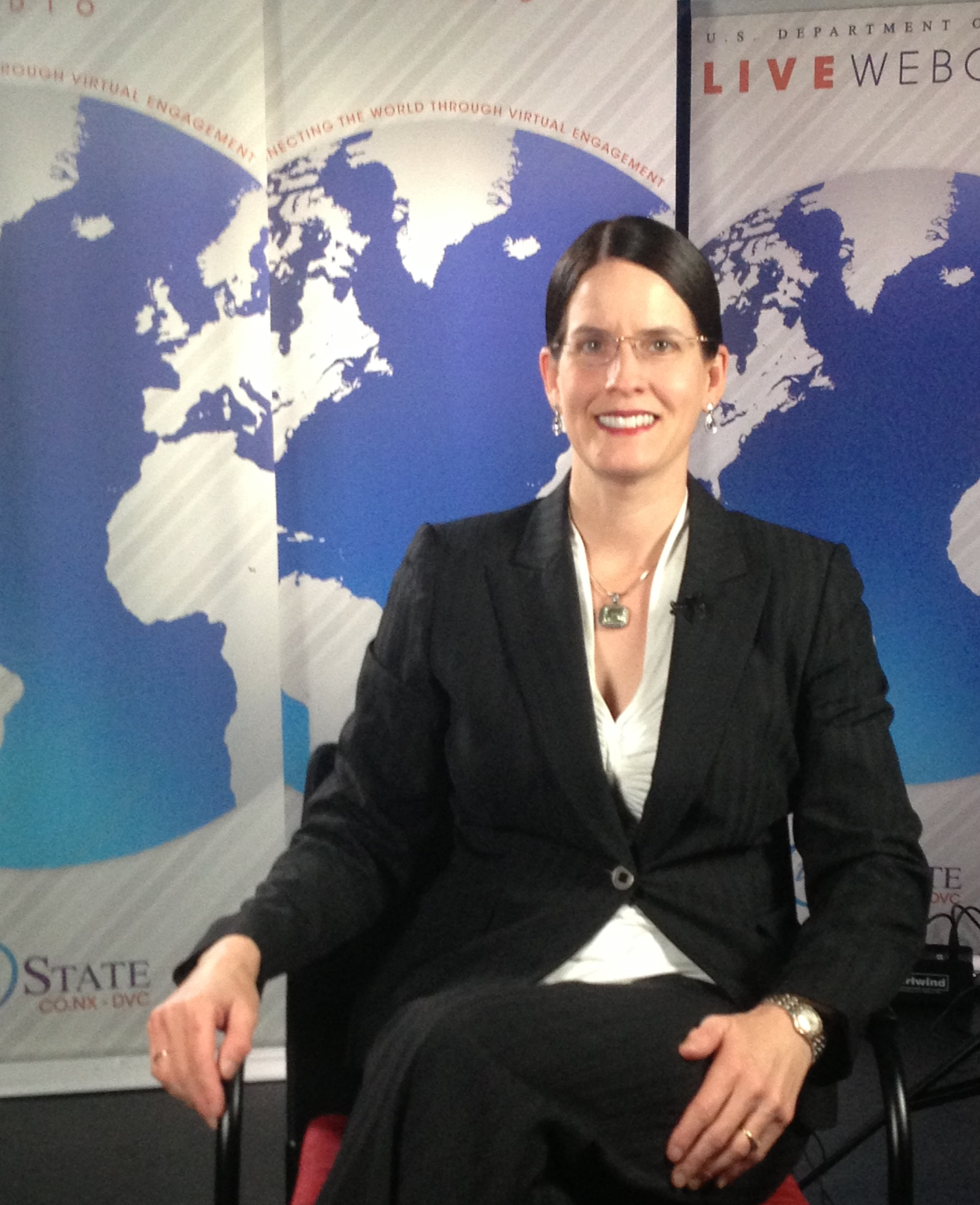
- Laura DeNardis in 2014 at the United States Department of State
- Born: 1966 (age 59–60); New Haven, Connecticut
- Education: Dartmouth College
- Occupations: Author and professor

Laura DeNardis is an American author and a scholar of Internet governance and technical infrastructure. She is the Professor and Endowed Chair in Technology, Ethics, and Society at Georgetown University. DeNardis is an affiliated Fellow of the Yale Information Society Project at Yale Law School and served as its executive director from 2008 to 2011. She previously served as a Senior Fellow of the Centre for International Governance Innovation (CIGI) and the Director of Research for the Global Commission on Internet Governance. With a background in information technology engineering and a doctorate in Science and Technology Studies (STS), her research studies the social and political implications of Internet technical architecture and governance. Domestically, she served as an appointed member of the U.S. Department of State Advisory Committee on International Communications and Information Policy (ACICIP) during the Obama Administration. She has more than two decades of experience as an expert consultant in Internet Governance to Fortune 500 companies, foundations, and government agencies.

In 2020, Wired UK listed DeNardis as one of "32 Global Innovators Who Are Building a Better Future." Her expertise and scholarship have been featured in Science Magazine, The Economist, NPR, New York Times, ABC news, Bloomberg, Time Magazine, Christian Science Monitor, Slate, Reuters, Forbes, The Atlantic, the Globe and Mail, Investor's Business Daily, and The Wall Street Journal.

In 2015 Laura DeNardis was elected as a member of the Cosmos Club in Washington, D.C.

== Early life and education ==
Laura DeNardis was born in New Haven, CT, in 1966. She is married to finance executive Deborah Smith. DeNardis and Smith's was one of the first same sex marriages in Connecticut in 2008.

DeNardis earned a PhD in Science and Technology Studies from Virginia Tech, an MEng from Cornell University, an AB in Engineering Science from Dartmouth College, and was awarded a postdoctoral fellowship from Yale Law School.

She resides in Washington, D.C.

== Books ==
- The Internet in Everything (Yale University Press, 2020) ISBN 9780300233070
- Researching Internet Governance: Methods, Frameworks, Futures (MIT Press 2020) ISBN 9780262539753
- The Turn to Infrastructure in Internet Governance (Palsgrave, 2016) ISBN 9781137533265
- The Global War for Internet Governance (Yale University Press, 2014) ISBN 9780300212525
- Opening Standards: The Global Politics of Interoperability (MIT Press, 2011) ISBN 9780262016025
- Protocol Politics: The Globalization of Internet Governance (MIT Press, 2009) ISBN 9780262526753
- Information Technology in Theory (Thompson, 2007) ISBN 9781423901402

== Areas of Expertise ==
- Research Concentration in Global Internet Governance
- U.S. Cyber Policy and International Cybersecurity
- Cyber Cooperation
- Technology, Media and World Politics
- Geopolitics of Technical Architecture Design
- Civil Liberties Online
- Cyber Institutions
- Privatized Governance
- Intellectual property
- Technical Expertise: Internet Protocols and Architecture
- Applied Mathematical Programming
- Domain Name System and Critical Internet Resources
- Telecommunications Engineering
- Information and Communication Technology Strategy
- Internet Interoperability

== Involvement with the Global Commission on Internet Governance ==
DeNardis served as the Research Director of the Global Commission on Internet Governance ourinternet.org (2014–2016).

She is also the Senior Fellow of the Centre for International Governance Innovation (CIGI) (2013–present).

== Major Lectures and Presentations ==
- European Consortium for Political Research Global Conference. Referred panel presentation "The Global Internet Governance Trajectory: Actors and States of Play," Montreal, Canada, August 27–29, 2015.
- United States Internet Governance Forum, Panel on Multistakeholder Governance, George Washington University, Washington, DC, July 16, 2015.
- Microsoft Research Faculty Summit 2015. Invited presentation, "Research Challenges in Internet Governance," Redmond, WA, July 7, 2015.
- Center for Democracy and Technology (CDT). Workshop on Standards and Human Rights, Washington, DC, June 19, 2015
- Columbia SIPA, Invited plenary panel talk, "Conference on Internet Governance and Cybersecurity," New York, NY, May 14, 2015.
- Brookings Institution, Invited presentation at "Global Governance Futures 2025," Washington, DC, May 6, 2015.
- Keynote Address at National Cybersecurity Centre One Conference, The Hague, Netherlands, April 13, 2015.
- "The Future of Internet Regulation," Invited presentation at the Ohio State University Moritz School of Law Symposium, I/S: A Journal of Law & Policy, March 27, 2015.
- Book talk on "The Global War for Internet Governance," New America Foundation, Washington, D.C. April 3, 2014
- Presentation on "The Global War for Internet Governance," Motion Picture Association of American (MPAA), Washington, D.C. April 2, 2014.
- Book talk on "The Global War for Internet Governance," The Carnegie Council, New York City, NY. February 26, 2014.
- Panel presentation on "The Internet's Top-Level Domain Expansion: Implications for Internet Freedom and Innovation," Beyond the Dot Conference, The Newseum, Washington, D.C. February 19, 2014.
- Book talk on "The Global War for Internet Governance," Yale Law School, Information Society Project, New Haven, CT. February 13, 2014.
- Book talk on "The Global War for Internet Governance," Annenberg School for Communication, University of Pennsylvania, Philadelphia, PA. February 12, 2014.
- Panel presentation on "The Paradox of Multistakeholder Internet Governance," 10th Annual State of the Net Conference, The Newseum, Washington, DC. January 28, 2014.
- Panel presentation on “Internet Governance 2020: Geopolitics and the Future of the Internet,” Center for Strategic and International Studies, Washington, D.C. January 23, 2014.
- Panel presentation on Developing a Strategic Vision for Internet Governance,” Eight Annual United Nations Internet Governance Forum, Bali, Indonesia. October 22, 2013.
- Presentation on "Thinking Clearly about Multistakeholder Internet Governance," Global Internet Governance Academic Network Annual Conference, Bali, Indonesia. October 21, 2013.
