= Juan Carlos De Martin =

Italian academic (born 1966)

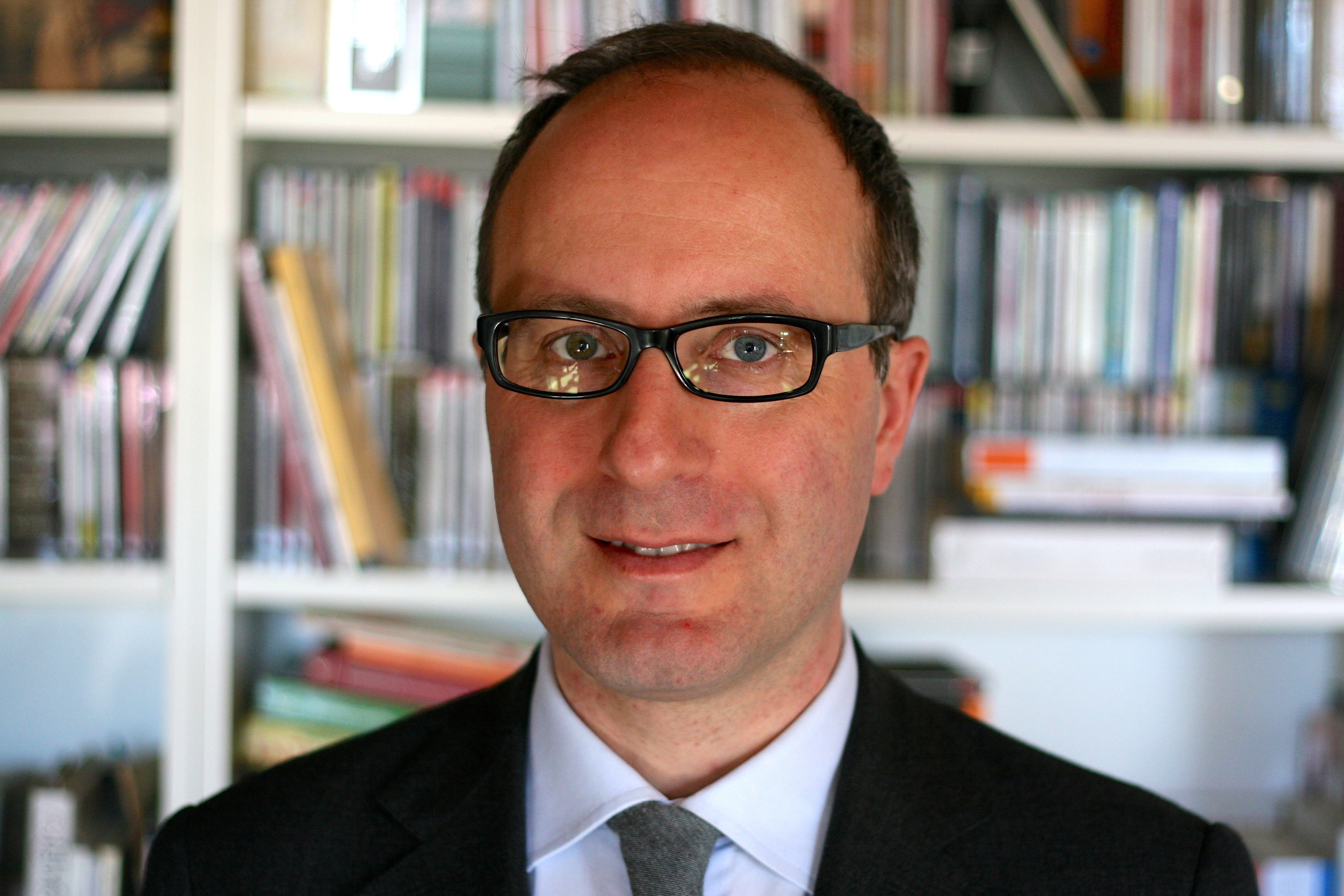
- Born: 1966-06-07
- Website: Official website

Juan Carlos De Martin (Córdoba (Argentina), 7 June 1966) is an Italian academic.

He is a full professor at the DAUIN Department of the Polytechnic of Turin, where he co-founded and co-directs the Nexa Center of Internet and Society. Since 2011, he is a Berkman Faculty Fellow at the Berkman Center for Internet & Society of Harvard University and Senior Visiting Researcher at the Internet and Society Laboratory of Keio University (Tokyo). It is known for its activities in the Internet and the Society, with particular attention to issues of copyright in the digital age and net neutrality. Often writes in the daily "La Stampa" as a columnist on issues related to digital technologies and their impact on society. He is a member of the Scientific Council of 'Encyclopedia Treccani' and Coordinators of the Scientific Council of "Democracy Biennial". It 'also an expert of the Italian Government Committee "Science and Society" of the Seventh Framework Programme (2007–2013) of the European Commission and, from April 2013, he is the 'National Point of Reference' for the open access policies, referring to the European Recommendation on access to and preservation of scientific information.

== Biography ==
From 1996 to 1998 he was a researcher of "Media Technologies Laboratory" of Texas Instruments in Dallas, Texas. In 1998 he returned to Italy to work, first as a researcher and then as a senior researcher at the Turin office of the National Research Council. Also in 1998 he founded, together with Professor Angelo Raffaele Meo of the Polytechnic of Turin, the research group "Internet Media Group", devoted to the study of advanced technical processing and transmission of multimedia information. In the summer of 1999, he is an "adjunct professor" at the School of Engineering and Computer Science at the University of Texas at Dallas, where he teaches a course on speech coding. In 2003 he founded, together with Marco Ricolfi (jurist at the ' University of Turin), "Creative Commons Italia", the working group that produced the Italian version of the licenses of copyright Creative Commons. Since January 2005, he is the "public lead" of Creative Commons in Italy, a position he holds until December 16, 2012, when he passed the baton to the new CC lead Italia, Federico Morando. In May 2005 he is the co-organizer of the Italian edition (the first in Western Europe) of the ' Internet Law Program of the Berkman Center for Internet & Society at Harvard University. In October 2005, he left the National Research Council to become an associate professor at the Polytechnic of Turin. In November 2006 he founded, together with Marco Ricolfi, the Nexa Center of Internet and Society, a research center at the Polytechnic of Turin (Department of Automatic and Computer Engineering) dedicated to issues of society. In 2007, De Martin became the coordinator of the European project "Communia", the European thematic network (50 members from 25 countries) for the study of public domain digital project funded by the European Union under the program eContentPlus. Also in 2007, De Martin is appointed by the Rector Francesco Profumo, president of the Library System of the Polytechnic of Turin, a position he kept until the end of 2011. Since 2008 he participates in the Internet Governance Forum Italia, which he co-organizes as Nexa Center, the 2012 edition which was held in Turin on 19–21 October 2012.

Prof. De Martin has participated in numerous conferences and meetings at national and international level, and regularly writes on the Turin daily "La Stampa" and "Il Sole 24 Ore" (insert "Nòva") as a columnist.

Among other initiatives, in January 2011, Prof. De Martin is one of the promoters of "Agenda Digitale" initiative, to stimulate Italian politicians about the need to give to the country a Digital Agenda, and the founder and editor of "Piazza Statuto", the site of discussion about the role and the main problems of the University. With regard to the teaching at the Polytechnic of Turin, having long taught courses in programming and multimedia, in March 2012 inaugurated a course in the first year of Engineering, entitled Rivoluzione Digitale (Digital Revolution).

== Works ==
In 2012 he edited, along with Melanie Dulong de Rosnay, the book The Digital Public Domain: Foundations for an Open Culture (Open Book Publishers; Cambridge, UK); as well as on paper, the volume is freely available online in PDF format with a Creative Commons license. His research primarily concerned voice coding, processing and transmission of multimedia information and themes 'Internet & Society'. Two articles of which De Martin was co-author received a "best paper award" IEEE (an article on Speech Recognition in 2005 and an article on network neutrality in 2011).
