= Nanette S. Levinson =

American scholar

Nanette Segal Levinson

Academic background
- Education: Harvard Graduate School of Education
- Thesis: College teacher preparation in Ph. D. programs at the University of Hawaii : policies, practices, and faculty attitudes (1979)

Nanette S. Levinson is a professor at American University known for her work on knowledge transfer, the internet, and social entrepreneurship.

== Education and career ==
Levinson has an A.B. (1968), an Ed.M. (1969), and an Ed.D (1979) from Harvard University. She joined the faculty at American University in 1980. She one of two faculty directors of The Internet Governance Lab.

== Work ==
Levinson is known for her work in telecommunications. In the classroom, Levinson has assigned her students to write podcasts as a means to improve their communication skills.

== Selected publications ==
- Levinson, Nanette S. (1985). New federal policies for R & D : impacts on government, industry & academe : proceedings of the Thirty-eighth National Conference on the Advancement of Research. University Press of America, Lanham. ISBN 9780819150066. OCLC 13342851.
- Levinson, Nanette S.; Asahi, Minoru (1995-09-01). "Cross-national alliances and interorganizational learning". Organizational Dynamics. 24 (2): 50–63. doi:10.1016/0090-2616(95)90071-3. ISSN 0090-2616.
- Cogburn, Derrick L.; Levinson, Nanette S. (2003). "U.S.-Africa Virtual Collaboration in Globalization Studies: Success Factors for Complex, Cross-National Learning Teams". International Studies Perspectives. 4 (1): 34–51. doi:10.1111/1528-3577.04103. ISSN 1528-3577.
- Abrahamse, Augusta; Johnson, Mathew; Levinson, Nanette; Medsker, Larry; Pearce, Joshua M.; Quiroga, Carla; Scipione, Ruth (2015). "A Virtual Educational Exchange: A North–South Virtually Shared Class on Sustainable Development". Journal of Studies in International Education. 19 (2): 140–159. doi:10.1177/1028315314540474. ISSN 1028-3153.
- Musiani, Francesca; Cogburn, Derrick L.; DeNardis, Laura; Levinson, Nanette S., eds. (2016). The Turn to Infrastructure in Internet Governance. New York: Palgrave Macmillan US. doi:10.1057/9781137483591. ISBN 978-1-349-57846-7.

== Honors and awards ==
Levinson received the International Communication Distinguished Scholar Award Distinguished Scholar by the International Studies Association in 2021.
