= William W. Fisher =

American lawyer

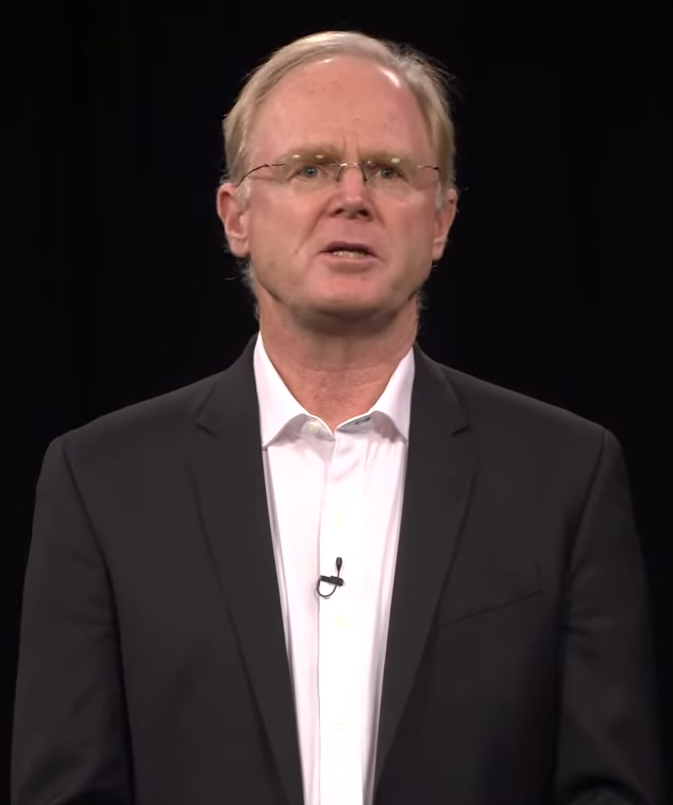
- Fisher in 2016
- Education: Amherst College; Harvard University
- Scientific career
- Fields: Intellectual property law Legal history
- Workplaces: Harvard Law School
- Website: tfisher.org

William "Terry" W. Fisher III is the WilmerHale Professor of Intellectual Property Law at Harvard Law School and faculty director of the Berkman Klein Center for Internet & Society. His primary research and teaching areas are intellectual property law and legal history.

In his book Promises to Keep: Technology, Law and the Future of Entertainment (Stanford University Press 2004), Fisher proposes replacing much of copyright and digital rights management with a government-administered reward system. Under such a scheme, movies and songs would be legal to download. Authors and artists would receive compensation from the government based on how often their works were read, watched, or listened to. The system would be funded by taxes.

Fisher is one of the founders of Noank Media, a private enterprise similar in many ways to the proposal of Promises to Keep. Noank licenses and distributes digital content by collecting blanket-license revenues from internet services providers and distributing revenues to authors and artists based on the size of their audience.

Fisher was among the lawyers, along with his colleague John Palfrey and the law firm of Jones Day, who represented Shepard Fairey, pro bono, in his lawsuit against the Associated Press related to the iconic Hope poster. In 2011, he represented Yoga for the People in a copyright dispute.

In 1976, Fisher graduated with a B.A. from Amherst College. He received a law degree and a Ph.D. in the history of American civilization from Harvard University. In 1982, he was a law clerk to Judge Harry T. Edwards of the United States Court of Appeals for the District of Columbia Circuit. During the 1983-1984 Term, he served as a law clerk to U.S. Supreme Court justice Thurgood Marshall.

Fisher teaches an online course on copyright law, based on the same course that he teaches at Harvard Law School. The online course, HLS1x (also referred to as CopyrightX), was offered during Spring 2013 on the EdX platform.

== See also ==
- List of law clerks for the tenth seat of the Supreme Court of the United States
