= Louise Amoore =

Political geographer

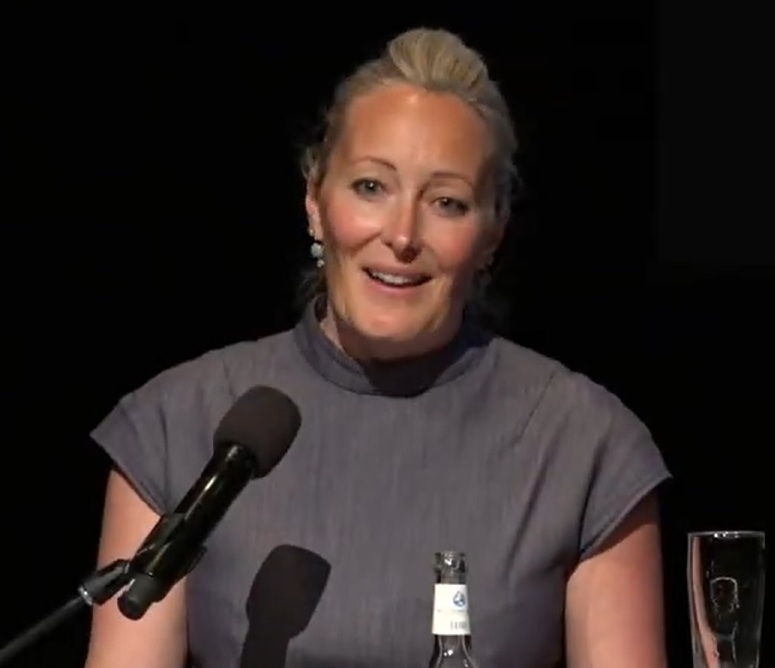
Professor Louise Amoore giving a lecture in 2019

Louise Jane Amoore, FBA (born 1972) is a British geographer and academic, who specialises in geopolitics, biometrics, state security and the ethics of machine learning. She is Professor of Political Geography at Durham University. From 2017 to 2023, she was a member of the Biometrics and Forensics Ethics Group (BFEG), a non-departmental advisory body which is the "only formally accountable ethics committee" within the UK Government's Home Office.

In 1998, she graduated with a Doctor of Philosophy (PhD) degree from Newcastle University for a doctoral thesis titled "The social roots of global change: states, firms and the restructuring of work".

In July 2023, Amoore was elected a Fellow of the British Academy (FBA), the United Kingdom's national academy for the humanities and social sciences.

== Selected works ==
- Amoore, Louise (2002). Globalization contested: an international political economy of work. Manchester: Manchester University Press. ISBN 978-0719060960.
- Amoore, Louise, ed. (2005). The global resistance reader. London: Routledge. ISBN 978-0415335843.
- Amoore, Louise (March 2006). "Biometric borders: Governing mobilities in the war on terror". Political Geography. 25 (3): 336–351. doi:10.1016/j.polgeo.2006.02.001.
- Amoore, Louise; de Goede, Marieke, eds. (2008). Risk and the war on terror. London New York: Routledge Taylor & Francis Group. ISBN 978-0415443241.
- Amoore, Louise (November 2011). "Data Derivatives: On the Emergence of a Security Risk Calculus for Our Times". Theory, Culture & Society. 28 (6): 24–43. doi:10.1177/0263276411417430.
- Amoore, Louise (2013). The politics of possibility: risk and security beyond probability. Durham, NC: Duke University Press. ISBN 978-0822355458.
- Amoore, Louise (2020). Cloud ethics: algorithms and the attributes of ourselves and others. Durham, NC: Duke University Press. ISBN 978-1478007784.
