= Berkman Klein Center for Internet & Society =

Research center at Harvard University

Coordinates: 42.37955°N 71.11957°W

- Formation: 1998; 28 years ago
- Type: Technology research center
- Location: Harvard University, Cambridge, Massachusetts, U.S.
- Website: cyber.harvard.edu

The Berkman Klein Center for Internet & Society is a research center at Harvard University that focuses on the study of cyberspace. Founded at Harvard Law School, the center traditionally focused on internet-related legal issues. On May 15, 2008, the center was elevated to an interfaculty initiative of Harvard University as a whole. It is named after the Berkman family. On July 5, 2016, the center added "Klein" to its name following a gift of $15 million from Michael R. Klein.

== History and mission ==
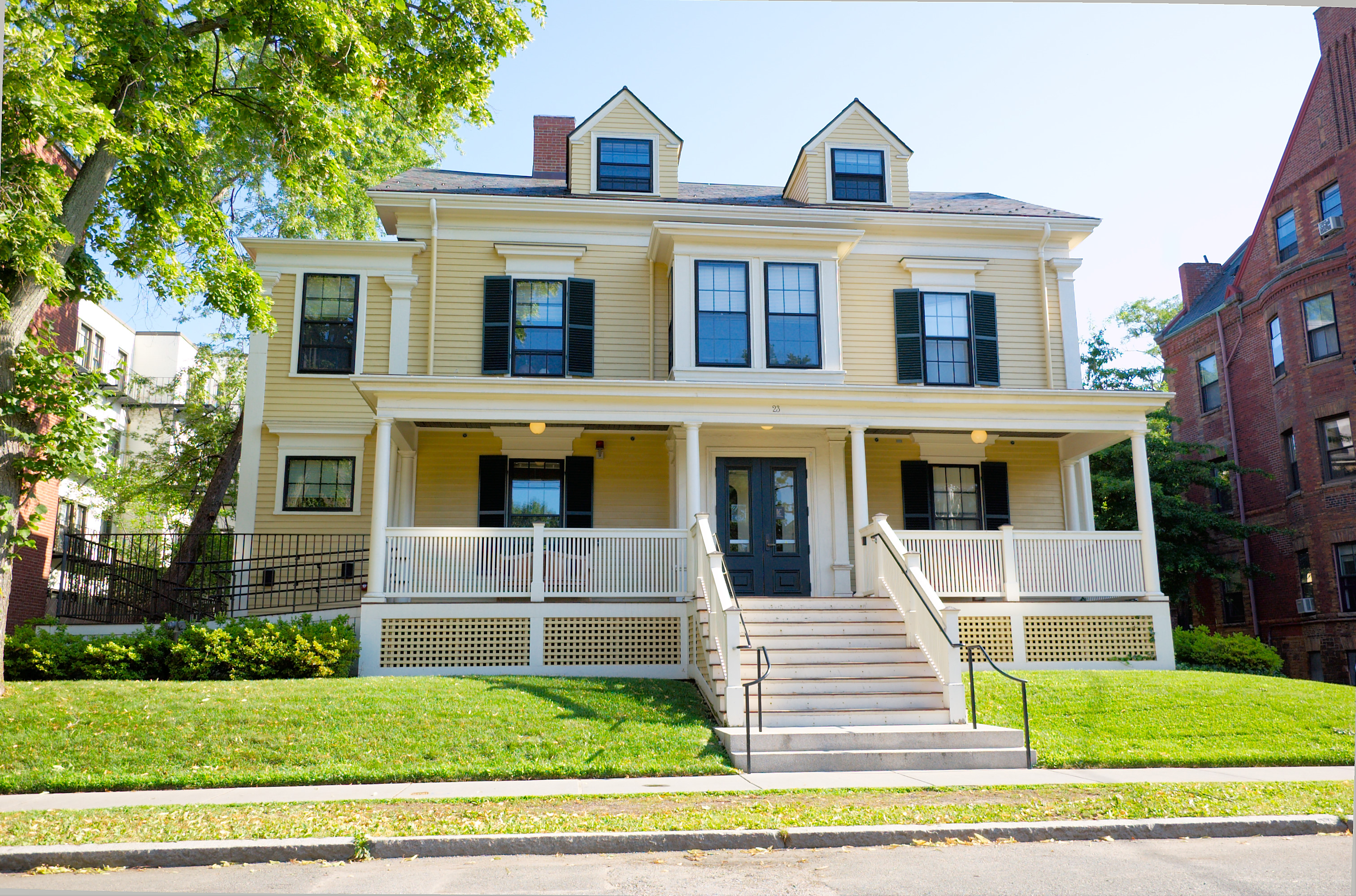
The location at 23 Everett Street

The center was founded in 1996 as the "Center on Law and Technology" by Jonathan Zittrain and Professor Charles Nesson. This was built on previous work including a 1994 seminar they held on legal issues involving the early Internet. Professor Arthur Miller and students David Marglin and Tom Smuts also worked on that seminar and related discussions. In 1997, the Berkman family underwrote the center, and Lawrence Lessig joined as the first Berkman professor. In 1998, the center changed its name to the "Berkman Center for Internet & Society at Harvard Law School." Since then, it has grown from a small project within Harvard Law School to a major interdisciplinary center at Harvard University. The Berkman Klein Center seeks to understand how the development of Internet-related technologies is inspired by the social context in which they are embedded and how the use of those technologies affects society in turn. It seeks to use the lessons drawn from this research to inform the design of Internet-related law and pioneer the development of the Internet itself. The Berkman Klein Center sponsors Internet-related events and conferences, and hosts numerous visiting lecturers and research fellows.

Members of the center teach, write books, scientific articles, weblogs with RSS 2.0 feeds (for which the Center holds the specification), and podcasts (of which the first series took place at the Berkman Klein Center). Its newsletter, The Buzz, is on the Web and available by e-mail, and it hosts a blog community of Harvard faculty, students, and Berkman Klein Center affiliates.

The Berkman Klein Center faculty and staff have also conducted major public policy reviews of pressing issues. In 2008, John Palfrey led a review of child safety online called the Internet Safety Technical Task Force. In 2009, Yochai Benkler led a review of United States broadband policy. In 2010, Urs Gasser, along with Palfrey and others, led a review of Internet governance body ICANN, focusing on transparency, accountability, and public participation.

== Projects and initiatives ==
The Berkman Klein Center's main research topics are Teens and Media, Monitoring, Privacy, Digital art, Internet Governance, Cloud Computing and Internet censorship. The Berkman Klein Center supports events, presentations, and conferences about the Internet and invites scientists to share their ideas.

=== Lumen ===
Lumen, formerly Chilling Effects, is a collaborative archive created by Wendy Seltzer that allows recipients of cease-and-desist notices to submit them to the site and receive information about their legal rights and responsibilities.

=== Digital Media Law Project ===
The Digital Media Law Project (DMLP) was a project hosted by the Berkman Klein Center for Internet & Society at Harvard Law School. It had previously been known as the Citizen Media Law Project. The purposes of the DMLP were:

1. To provide resources and other assistance, including legal assistance as of 2009, to individuals and groups involved in online and citizen media.
2. To ensure "online journalists, media organizations, and their sources are allowed to examine and debate network security and data protection vulnerabilities without criminal punishment, in order to inform citizens and lawmakers about networked computer security."
3. To facilitate the participation of citizens in online media.
4. To protect the freedom of speech on the Internet.

In 2014, Berkman Klein Center announced that it would "spin off its most effective initiatives and cease operation as a stand-alone project within the Berkman Klein Center."

=== Internet and Democracy Project ===
The Berkman Klein Center operated the now-completed Internet and Democracy Project, which describes itself as an:

initiative that will examine how the Internet influences democratic norms and modes, including its impact on civil society, citizen media, government transparency, and the rule of law, with a focus on the Middle East. Through a grant of $1.5 million from the US Department of State's Middle East Partnership Initiative, the Berkman Center will undertake the study over the next two years in collaboration with its extended community and institutional partners. As with all its projects, the Berkman Center retains complete independence in its research and other efforts under this grant. The goal of this work is to support the rights of citizens to access, develop and share independent sources of information, to advocate responsibly, to strengthen online networks, and to debate ideas freely with both civil society and government. These subjects will be examined through a series of case studies in which new technologies and online resources have influenced democracy and civic engagement. The project will include original research and the identification and development of innovative web-based tools that support the goals of the project. The team, led by Project Director Bruce Etling, will draw on communities from around the world, with a focus on the Middle East.

=== StopBadware ===
In 2006, the center established the non-profit organization StopBadware, aiming to stop viruses, spyware, and other threats to the open Internet, in partnership with the Oxford Internet Institute, Google, Lenovo and Sun Microsystems. In 2010, StopBadware became an independent entity supported by Google, PayPal, and Mozilla.

=== Digital Public Library of America ===
The Digital Public Library of America is a project aimed at making a large-scale digital public library accessible to all.

=== Ethics and Governance of Artificial Intelligence ===
In 2017, the BKC received a $27M grant with the MIT Media Lab to "advance artificial intelligence research for the public good" and "to ensure automation and machine learning are researched, developed, and deployed in a way which vindicates social values of fairness, human autonomy, and justice."

== Members ==
Fellows include or have included:

- John Perry Barlow
- Danah boyd
- Amber Case
- Kathy Pham
- Jacinda Ardern
- John Clippinger
- Yasodara Córdova
- Primavera de Filippi
- Tamar Frankel
- Samer Hassan
- Benjamin Mako Hill
- Reynol Junco
- Rebecca MacKinnon
- James F. Moore
- Mayo Fuster Morell
- Bruce Schneier
- Doc Searls
- Wendy Seltzer
- Peter Suber
- Jimmy Wales
- David Weinberger
- Dave Winer
- Ethan Zuckerman
- Mary L. Gray

Faculty include:

- Yochai Benkler
- William W. Fisher
- Lawrence Lessig
- Charles Nesson
- John Palfrey
- Jonathan Zittrain
- Alejandra Caraballo

The center also has active groups of faculty associates, affiliates and alumni who host and participate in their projects each year.

== See also ==
- Berkeley Center for Law and Technology at Boalt Hall
- Canadian Internet Policy and Public Interest Clinic at University of Ottawa Faculty of Law
- Centre for Internet and Society (India)
- Haifa Center for Law & Technology at Haifa University
- Information Society Project at Yale Law School
- NEXA Center for Internet and Society at the Polytechnic University of Turin
- Openlaw
- Oxford Internet Institute
