= Chinmayi Arun =

Indian professor

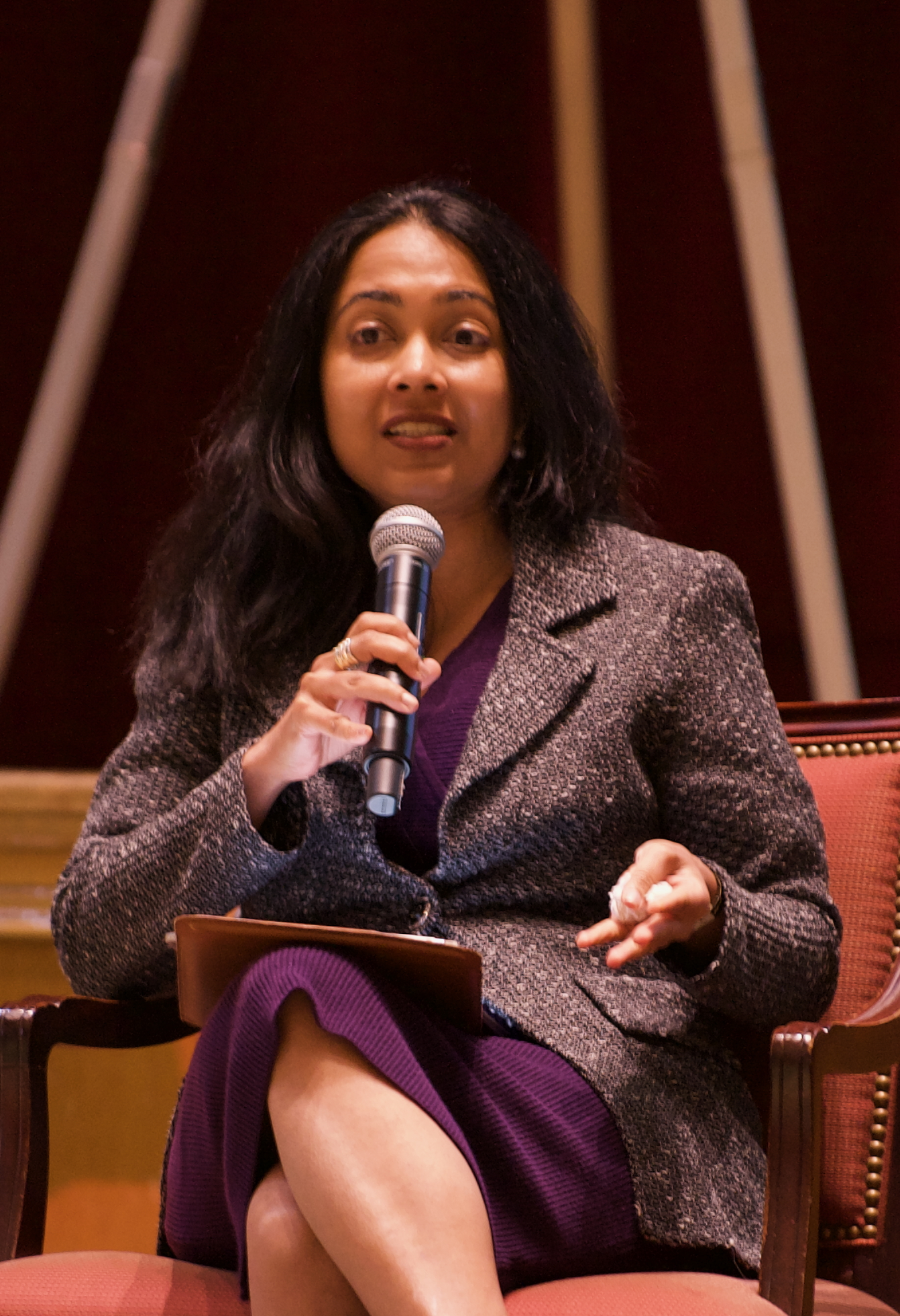
- Arun at the Knight First Amendment Institute in 2024
- Education: NALSAR University of Law
- Occupation: Professor

Chinmayi Arun is a Research Scholar in Law and the executive director of the Information Society Project at Yale Law School. She is a former assistant professor of law at the National Law University, Delhi, India, where she was founder and director of the Centre for Communication Governance.

== Education ==
Chinmayi Arun went to the Frank Anthony Public School in Bangalore.

=== Higher Education ===
Arun received a B.A, LL.B degree at the National Academy of Legal Studies and Research NALSAR University in Hyderabad in 2006. She then went to the London School of Economics and Political Economics to pursue LL.M from 2008 to 2009.

== Career ==
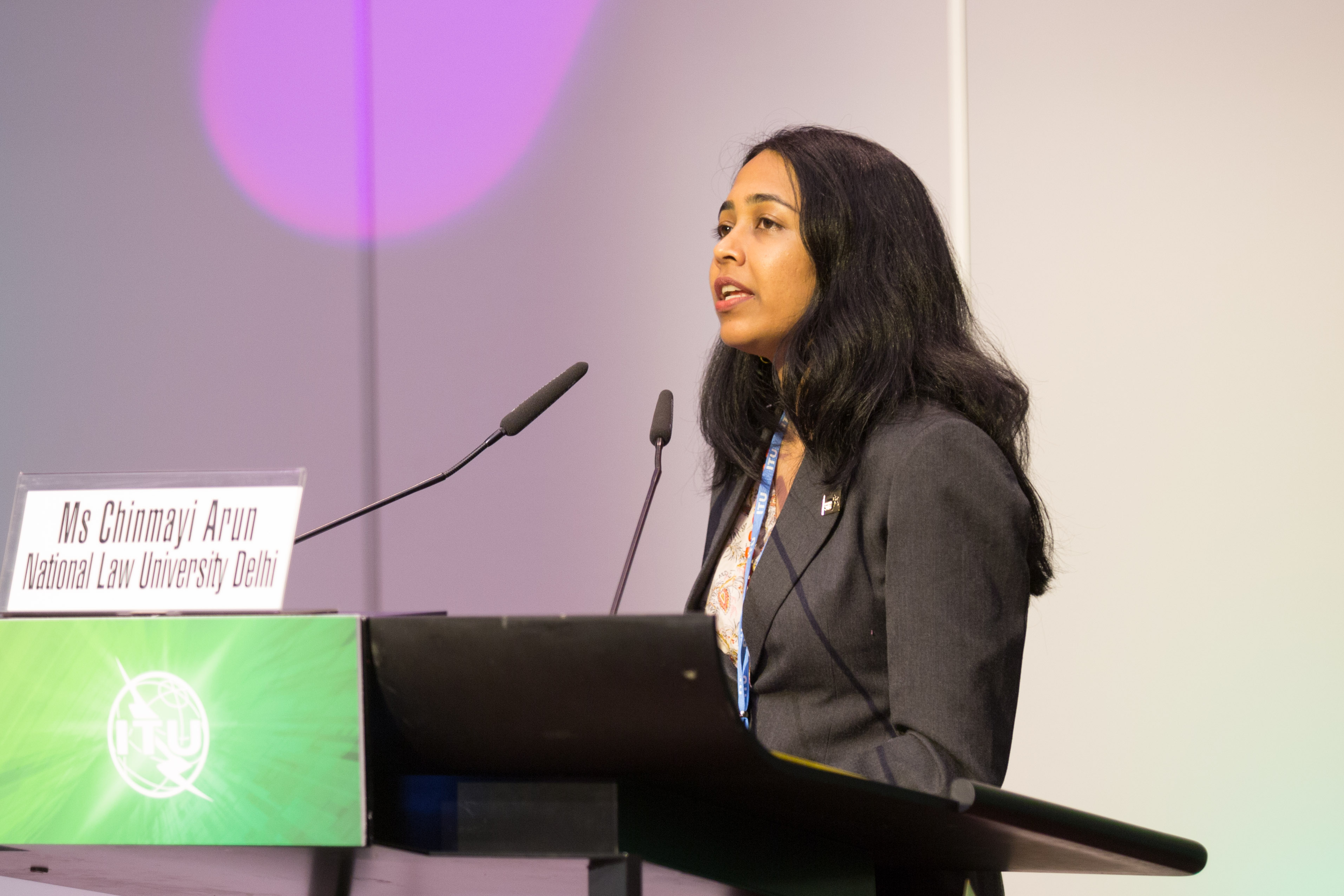
Arun at National Law University Delhi, India High-Level Policy Statements in May 2016

On account of Chinmayi Arun's work on law and technology in India, she was featured on The Print's list of "36 brilliant Indian women"..

=== Published work ===
Chinmayi Arun's work comprises various articles and research papers written for numerous sources, including Indian newspaper The Hindu a

- 'Hate Laws in India', a paper written for The National Law University, New Delhi, and was co-authored by Arpita Biswas and Parul Sharma.
- 'Preliminary Findings on Online Hate Speech and the Law in India' co-authored by Nakul Nayak.
- An article on how 'Privacy is a fundamental right' for India-based newspaper The Hindu
- An Indian Express article on India's 'surveillance regime and safeguards for the right to privacy'.
- 'Rebalancing Regulation of Speech: Hyper-Local Content on Global Web-Based Platforms' on Berkman Klein Center (medium series)
- Article for Live Mint on 'Hacktivism' and 'Distributed Denial of Service Attacks as legitimate protest'.
