= Sidgwick =

Sidgwick is a surname. Notable people with the surname include:

- Alfred Sidgwick (1850–1943), logician and philosopher at Owens College in Manchester, husband of Cecily Sidgwick
- Arthur Sidgwick (1840–1920), English classical scholar and schoolteacher
- Arthur Hugh Sidgwick (1882–1917), British educationist, poet and essayist
- Cecily Sidgwick (1854–1934), British novelist who wrote under the name Mrs Alfred Sidgwick
- Eleanor Mildred Sidgwick (1845–1936), English activist for higher education of women
- Frank Sidgwick (1879-1939), British publisher and novelist, co-founder of Sidgwick & Jackson
- Henry Sidgwick (1838–1900), English philosopher and economist
- Mary Sidgwick Benson (1841–1918), English hostess, wife of Edward Benson, Archbishop of Canterbury
- Nevil Sidgwick (1873–1952), English theoretical chemist
- Robert Sidgwick (1851–1934), English cricketer
- Rose Sidgwick (1877–1918), British university teacher, co-founder of International Federation of University Women

== See also ==
- Sedgewick (disambiguation)
- Sedgwick (disambiguation)
- Sidgwick & Jackson, imprint of the publishing company Pan Macmillan
- Sidgwick Avenue, road in Cambridge, England
- Sidgwick Site, University of Cambridge
