= British Federation of Women Graduates =

- Abbreviation: BFWG
- Predecessor: British Federation of University Women
- Founder: Ida Smedley Maclean
- Founded at: Manchester
- Type: Women's association Nonprofit
- Headquarters: PO Box 1225, Whitstable CT5 9EA
- Location: London, England
- Official language: English
- President: Kay Howell
- Affiliations: Graduate Women International
- Website: bfwg.org.uk/bfwg2/

The British Federation of Women Graduates (BFWG) was founded in 1907 as the British Federation of University Women (BFUW) to "afford a means of communication and of united action in matters affecting the interest of women". It was renamed the British Federation of Women Graduates in 1992. The current organisation "seeks to promote opportunities for women in education, and public life more generally" and provides "graduate women living in England, Scotland and Wales with information, support and friendship, at local, regional, national and international levels. Conferences, meetings, networks and social events, at all levels, are open to all members". The BFWG is affiliated to the International Federation of University Women (IFUW), of which it was a founder member, and University Women of Europe (UWE).

== History ==
The British Federation of University Women was founded in 1907, in Manchester, "to afford a means of communication and of united action in matters affecting the interests of women". Ida Smedley, Sarah Burstall, Dr Catherine Chisholm, Dr Merry Smith and Miss Coignou were the first to set up BFUW in order to support the progress of women in medicine, academia and public life. Other notable women who were part of BFWG in its early years included Winifred Cullis, Rose Sidgwick and Caroline Spurgeon. Associations were set up across Britain to pursue these aims by lobbying government and by fulfilling the BFUW motto: "Let us perfect the art of friendship". During World War I, BFUW compiled a register of university women offering themselves for public service which was used by the Board of Trade. After the war there was still the need to work for the opening of the professions to women, though a few members gained places in local government, notably Sybil Campbell, Monica Mary Geikie Cobb (the first woman barrister to hold a brief), Margaret Kydd (one of the first women to take silk), and Rose Heilbron. Equal pay was an important focus between the wars, particularly with relation to teaching and the civil service; as was the abolition of the marriage bar for working women. Before and during World War II, BFUW supported refugees from fascism.

In 1992 the name was changed to the British Federation of Women Graduates in response to changing times and the need to be inclusive of all who have degrees or equivalent qualifications.

== Structure ==
The Leadership Team consists of a president and 5 vice presidents. Local Associations enable members to "perfect the art of friendship" while promoting the Federation’s aims. Independent membership is available for those who do not live near an Association. Membership is open to all women graduates, irrespective of subject, university or nationality.

=== Notable presidents ===
BFWG published a presidents list in 2007

- Sara Burstall (1907—1909)
- Eleanor Mildred Sidgwick (1909—1913)
- Ethel Sargant (1913—1918)
- Emily Penrose (1919)
- Caroline Spurgeon (1919v1924)
- Margaret Tuke (1924—1925)
- Winifred Cullis (1925—1929)
- Ida Smedley Maclean (1929—1935)
- Frances Melville (1935—1942)
- Helen Wodehouse (1942—1945)
- Edith Clara Batho (1945—1950)

== Scholarships ==
Since 1912, BFUW/BFWG has given scholarships to assist women in academia. Caroline Spurgeon was the first recipient and she was followed by many notable women, including Ursula Dronke, Philippa Foot, Christine Hamill and Eila Campbell. Now the BFWG Scholarship Fund annually gives scholarships to outstanding women in their final year of a PhD who are registered at a British University. In 1992, BFWG sold Crosby Hall and set up the BFWG Charitable Foundation, known as Funds for Women Graduates (FfWG), which gives grants to postgraduate women at British universities who are in financial need.

== International Federation of University Women ==
In 1919, Caroline Spurgeon and Rose Sidgwick from BFUW and Virginia Gildersleeve, Dean of Barnard College and a representative of the American Association of Collegiate Alumnae, were instrumental in setting up the International Federation of University Women (IFUW). BFWG is still a vital part of IFUW, now Graduate Women International (GWI) and BFUW/BFWG members have served on its Board. Through its affiliation to GWI BFWG has consultative status at the UN; supports development in other affiliates by contributions to the GWI Bina Roy Partners in Development programmes; and helps displaced women graduates via the Hegg-Hoffet Fund.
