= Pukwudgie =

Creature in Wampanoag folklore

A Pukwudgie (American English pronunciation: /ˈpʌkˌwʌʒiː/ (Note: This may be close to how the term is pronounced tribally (informal phonetization: "bug-wuh-jih-wih-nih-nee, bug-wuh-jih-nih-nee, or boog-wuh-jee-mun, depending on the tribe" according to Native Languages of the Americas site.)), also spelled Puk-Wudjie is a mischievous or menacing dwarfish human-like creature of Native American lore.

It has become particularly known as part of the folklore of the Wampanoag people of Massachusetts in the Eastern U.S. (the tribe who aided the Plymouth Colony, thus related to the Thanksgiving celebration). But it was originally part of the folktale of the Ojibwe people of the Great Lakes region published in the 1839 Henry Rowe Schoolcraft (whose wife Jane was of Ojibwa descent) and made famous nationwide by the adaptation by poet Henry Wadsworth Longfellow of the canto "The Death of Kwasind" (by the hands of) in The Song of Hiawatha (1855). Though Longfellow was a New Englander (and descended from the Pilgrim fathers), it was handiwork of the hometown newspaper and local history (1906) of Middleboro, Massachusetts that transposed the setting of the Kwasind murder to their own town.

Later, Wampanoag natives crafted tales that deliberately borrowed the "Pukwudgie", and retold them for the purpose of Indian cultural awareness. Some of these were collected and published by Elizabeth Reynard in The Narrow Land (1934).

== Nomenclature ==
Pukwudgie (lit. 'person of the wilderness', 'little wild man of the forest'), also styled Pukwudgee; Bokwjimen (pl. Bokwjimenak, where bokwi = 'short in length'), Bgoji-nini (pl. Bgoji-nin-wag, where bgoji- = 'wild'), or Bagwajinini (pl. Bagwajininiwag, where bagwaj = 'in the wild[erness]'), etc. (Note: Native Languages of the Americas has collected numerous aliases and variants.) The being is both an individual and a race. Another ad hoc spelling, Puck-wudj-ininee was given by Henry Rowe Schoolcraft (1793-1864) and translated as "little wild man of the woods that vanishes" in private correspondence. (Note: Schoolcraft's book (1839) gives "Puck wudj ininee" as meaning "little wild man of the mountains".)

The lore among the Mohegan people speak of the Mukheahweesug or Makiawisug as a similar forest spirit.

Among the Mi'kmaq (of Nova Scotia and Prince Edward Island) the equivalent is known as the Mikumwess. However, a different source characterizes Migumoowesoo as more like fauns or demigods that haunt the woods, dance and play, and lure travelers, while giving Wĭggŭl-laddŭm moochkĭk (lit. 'very little people') as the equivalent of fairies; this being clearly equivalent to Rand: Wigŭlădŭmooch for "fairy" (or Wiklatmu'j/Wiklatmu:j which can mean "midget"). Micmac fairies or little people are also known as Bodaladamooge (Rand: Poogoolădŭmooch, Pukulatmu'j/Pukulatmu:j which can mean "troll") or "Stone People". These Little People or Stone People according to tradition left carved symbols on rocks, and are thus connected to petroglyph research.

For the Miami (of Indiana), the equivalent is known as Paisa/Pa-i-sa/Paissa (pl. Pa-i-sa-ki, meaning 'dwarf'). (Note: Przybylek (2016), p. 796a citing Redfish and Lewis 2009; Eberhart 2002, 444.)

=== Name origins ===
The term Pukwudgie is not of attested old usage in the Massachusetts area, and although the local natives did had preserved folklore concerning the little people, the original name they were called by in their New England languages is lost to history, as explained by Stephen Gencarella, professor of folklore studies at University of Massachusetts Amherst.

An Ojibwe folktale on the Pukwudgie from the Great Lakes region was published by Schoolcraft (1839, summarized under § Literature below), and made into a cast of characters by Longfellow in his poem Hiawatha, namely the killers in the chapter of "The Death of Kwasind". Encouraged by the popularity of the poem, the name of Pukwudgie and notions about them were subsequently "imported to Massachusetts". (Note: Possibly Longfellow being a New England poet was a factor.) A version of Kwa-sind being killed by the "Puk-wudjees", displacing the murder scene to a lake island in Middleboro, Massachusetts was published in Thomas Weston's History (1906, detailed under § Literature below) (Note: As for Weston (1906)'s version of "Puk-wudjees" killing Kwa-sind was sourced from the local paper Middleboro Gazette, and Gencarella has tentatively identifies the original author to have been the missionary Granville Sproat who was a protégé of Schoolhouse and once stationed in Michigan, but had returned to his hometown of Middelboro)

== Mythology ==
The Ojibwa folktale in Schoolcraft's Algic Researches (1839) entitled "Puck Wudj Ininee" describes the origins of the little people, originally a single orphaned boy named Wa-Dais-Ais-Imid ("He of the Little Shell") (Note: Or Wadaisemid (lit. 'he of the [magic] little shell'), equated with culture hero Tcikapis (var. Jakabich) who became "Vanishing Little Man". The Ojibwa term for "shell" is ess.) who lived with his sister. He had the ability to become invisible. He hunted down many prey, which was skinned and preserved by his little sister. But his escapades escalated to tracking Manabozho after the latter gathered his hunted beavers, and stealing a tail from the quarry, which he repeated. Though the boy eluded detection, when he deliberately showed himself to Manabozho, the victim of theft was so enraged and determined to kill him, that the boy resolved to flee and live among the mountains and rocks, telling his sister he was to be called "Puck Wudj Ininee" ever afterwards.

The legend of the "Little People" known as Pukwudgies is widespread among the Algonquin language speaking Native American tribes in the Northeastern United States and the Great Lakes region, including the Algonquin/Ojibwe, Wampanoag, and the Lenni-Lenape of east-central Indiana.

The shape-shifting Pukwudgies in their native form are said to be short-statured, no more than knee-high (2–3 feet (0.61–0.91 m) tall), and gray-skinned, with very large noses, ears, and fingers. But they can transform into dangerous beasts (cougars or quilled porcupine), or appear and disappear at will. They may also have the power to bring harm to people by staring them down.

Pukwudgies are said to be the enemies of culture heroes, the giant Maushop and his wife, Granny Squanit. According to the myth of the Massachusetts Wampanoag, Pukwudgies were originally well-intentioned helper spirits, except they were bunglers and their efforts tended to backfire. Eventually they turned increasingly mischievous and menacing, and the native humans begged Granny Squanit for succor, so that the giant Maushop gathered up many Pukwudgies and swung them around, leaving them scattered around New England in a disoriented state, but while many of them died, the survivors eventually reassembled in Massachusetts. When Maushop took respite from the extermination, the Pukwudgies came out of the woodworks, and turned to kidnapping children, driving the tribe into greater misery having to seek haven in the deeper woods. For Fritz's retold children's book version, cf. § Literature below.

Thus while the Ojibwe are rather dismissive of the Little Folk as little more than pranksters, the Wampanoag warn of disrespecting a Pukwudgies lest they fire their poisoned arrows, lure victims to their deaths in the forest, push them off cliffs, start fires, attack their victims with short knives and spears, use sand to blind their victims, as well as kidnapping children.

== Literature ==
External images
- Pukwudgies casting pinecones at Kwasind — Artist uncertain, from Longfellow. Hiawatha, Chicago: M. A. Donohue, 1898 (Note: Captioned: "There they stood, all armed and waiting,/ Hurled the pine-cones down upon him".)
- "Death of Kwasind", wash drawing by Thomas Moran (1876)

Henry Wadsworth Longfellow's poem The Song of Hiawatha (1855), Chapter XVIII, "The Death of Kwasind" tells of the death of the giant Kwasind by the Pukwudgies: while navigating his bark canoe, the little folk pelted him with pinecones from the pine and blue cones of the fir tree, the only method capable of slaying the giant. (Note: Note there is also another "Minnehaha edition" of Hiawatha, Chicago: Samuel C. Andrews 1898, Ch. XVIII, pp. 154–157.) Longfellow was inspired to write the epic after reading the lore of the Great Lakes region Natives, as articulated by Schoolcraft in Algic Researches (1839).

Thomas Weston (1834–1920) in History of the town of Middleboro, Massachusetts (1906) prints an anonymous "legend" set in "Assawampsett Pond" (Assawompset Pond), where on the enchanted island ("Man-i-to Me-nis") dwelled the "Puk-wudjees", who found the outsider Kwa-sind ("Strong Man") who had arrived by canoe asleep on their shores, and killed him. The Puk-wudjees heard the disturbing cries of the whip-poor-will (nightjar) and decided a murder must have taken place, and this stranger must have been the culprit. Their magician cast a never-waking spell on Kwa-sind. Though purporting to be Wampanoag legend, this was just a retelling of the aforementioned Kwasind legend, relocated to Middleboro, Massachusetts.

Elizabeth Reynard The Narrow Land (1934), an anthology of tales around Cape Cod, (Note: Cf. Reynard's The Narrow Land manuscript.) included tales contributed by Chief Red Shell (Clarence Wixon), a member of the Mashpee Wampanoag Tribe. In his storytelling, the chief expediently borrowed Ojibwe material (as well as the name "Pukwudgie" for the little people), to serve the overweening purpose of promoting Indian cultural awareness. Here it is told that Maushop and his wife Quant had five sons. In the land also dwelled the evil, magic-using Pukwudgees who formed seven bands each with a leader, headed by a chief of chiefs who was a master magician and an archer, his body cloaked entirely in green leaves. These little people trained Tei-Pai-Wankas (will-o'-the-wisps) to light up a path at night, only to lure travelers to a quicksand. They transformed into bears, deflecting arrows. The angered Maushop patrolled the peninsula, but failing to find the well-hidden foe, recruited his five sons to form a search party. But at Poponesset Marsh the sons were ambushed with blinding magic, then shot with poison arrows, beyond healing, and died. (Note: Reynard (1934), pp. 29–31, reprinted in Simmons (2018), pp. 217–218.) The dejected Maushop one day thought he saw a seabird riding the waves from afar, but it was a canoe with a pair of fake white wings made of skin; when he approached to retrieved the drifting vessel, sharp darts shot him in the leg, like the Pukwudgees' arrows. He fled to the south and never returned, possibly killed by the contraption. (Note: Reynard (1934), p. 31, reprinted in Simmons (2018), pp. 218–219.)

The retold myth in Reynard's anthology later inspired Jean Fritz's children's book, The Good Giants and the Bad Pukwudgies (1982), a version in which the Pukwudgies grew jealous of the love lavished upon humans by Maushop and his wife Squant, and while Maushop successfully shaped the lands of Nantucket and Cape Cod for the humans, the Pukwudgies attempts turned to failure, and Maushop received sole credit as creation god. The remainder is close to how the tale unwinds in Reynard's book. (Note: The embittered Pukwudgies after tormenting the human folk were punished by Maushop, managed to kill his five sons with poisoned arrows, wounded Maushop too and caused him to drift away or die, disappearing from the land.)
