= Sedgewick =

Sedgewick could refer to:

- Robert Sedgewick (disambiguation), several people
- Sedgwick Avenue, Bronx, New York
- Sedgewick, Alberta, place
- General Sedgewick, a U.S. Army Ship in the American Civil War

== See also ==
- Sedgwick (disambiguation)
