= Amy Rustomjee =

Indian educator

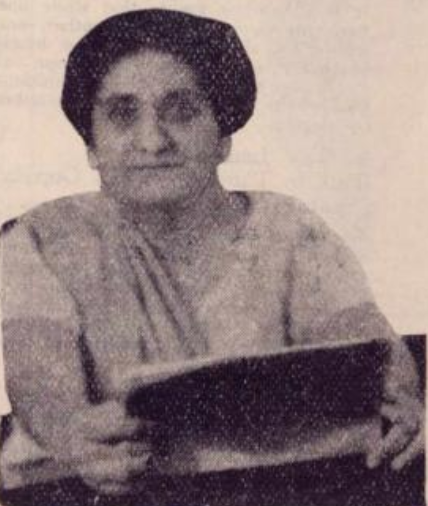
- Amy Rustomjee, from a 1940 issue of The Indian Listener
- Born: 18 May 1896; Pune
- Died: 1976 (aged approximately 80)
- Other names: Amy Rustomji
- Occupation: Educator

Amy Behramjee Hormusjee Jamsetjee Rustomjee (18 May 1896 – 1976) was an Indian educator and school principal, based in Bombay. She served as vice president of the International Federation of University Women from 1956 to 1959.

== Early life and education ==
Rustomjee was born in Poona, into a Parsi family, the daughter of B.H.J. Rustomjee and Hilla J. M. Cursetjee. Her father was a merchant and a school principal. She held a diploma in education from the University of Bombay, and took the Cambridge Tripos in English.

== Career ==
=== Education and literacy work ===
Rustomjee was principal of the Secondary Training College in Bombay for four years, the first woman to hold that post. Rustomjee gave a lecture in 1931 on the "Abolition of Illiteracy", advocating for voluntary literacy work as a condition of college matriculation. She was a member of the Adult Education Committee in Bombay in 1938, inspector of girls' schools, and one of the leaders of a city-wide literacy drive in 1939. As a member of the committee to select textbooks for Bombay schools in 1941, she clashed with Lilavati Munshi.

In the 1940s, Rustomjee was heard regularly on Bombay radio, speaking on education and literacy topics. She also wrote articles on educational topics. In 1949, she served on a committee about social service work in Bombay. In the early 1960s, she was involved with the Victoria Memorial School for the Blind.

=== Women's organizations and Girl Guides ===
In 1937, Rustomjee was Commissioner of the Girl Guides in Bombay. Later in life, she was president of the Indian Federation of University Women's Associations, and served as vice president of the International Federation of University Women from 1956 to 1959. In 1957 and 1958 she toured in the United States with other leaders of the Federation. In a 1958 debate on women and municipal administration, organized by the State Women's Council in Bombay, she opposed women taking over all municipal administrative roles.

"Miss Rustomji never showed any restraint and, whatever the occasion, would just let herself go and call a spade a spade, no matter who the person she was speaking to or about," recalled her colleague D. C. Pavate, who nonetheless considered her "a good sort, very well-meaning, honest, and sincere."

== Personal life and legacy ==
Amy Rustomjee lived with her aunt, J. M. Cursetjee. Rustomjee died in 1976. The Amy Rustomjee Hall at the Women's Graduate Union in Mumbai and the Amy Rustomjee International Scholarship at the University of Mumbai are named in her memory.
