= Graduate Women International =

Graduate Women International (GWI), originally named the International Federation of University Women (IFUW), is an international organisation for women university graduates. IFUW was founded in 1919 following the First World War by both British and North American college and university workers who were hoping to contribute to congenial relations between women of different nationalities. Over 100 years later, GWI continues to advocate for women's rights, equality and empowerment through the access to quality secondary and tertiary education as well as training up to the highest levels. The goal is for 100% of girls and women worldwide to achieve an education beyond primary school.

Graduate Women International (GWI) is based in Geneva, Switzerland, and advocates for girls' and women's rights, equality and empowerment through access to lifelong quality education. The organisation's work is centred on Education for All, Secondary Education, Tertiary Education, Continuing Education, and Non-Traditional Education to empower girls and women.

GWI has national affiliates in 60 countries and individual members in more than 40 countries. The organization was the ninth non-governmental organization (NGO) to receive special consultative status with the United Nations Economic and Social Council and is a NGO maintaining official relations with UNESCO and the ILO. GWI advocates actively through the Commission on the Status of Women (CSW) and the Convention on the Elimination of all forms of Discrimination Against Women (CEDAW). CEDAW is the most comprehensive international agreement on the human rights of women. It calls for states to eliminate all forms of discrimination on the basis of gender and sets an agenda for achieving full equality between women and men.

Over its centenary existence, the organisation has managed grass roots projects, done capacity-building and advocated with leaders all over the world in favour of girls' and women's education and empowerment.

== History ==
In the aftermath of World War I, Dean Virginia Gildersleeve of Barnard College, Professor Caroline Spurgeon of the University of London and Rose Sidgwick of the University of Birmingham created IFUW to help prevent another catastrophe such as the recent war in Europe. These women believed that if they could unite university women from around the world, the fostering of friendship and understanding would lead to a fostering of peace.

On 11 July 1919, IFUW was founded in London with founding members from three countries: Canada, Great Britain, and the United States. In addition to promoting peace, the advancement of careers for women in university formed a major objective for the organisation. IFUW created fellowships and promoted the founding of women's clubhouses where women could stay during research visits overseas. Theodora Bosanquet was executive secretary to the IFUW from 1920 to 1935, developing its library at Crosby Hall in London where both the IFUW and British Federation of University Women had offices and offered accommodation for female academics.

At the first IFUW Conference in 1920, national organisations from Canada, Czechoslovakia, France, Great Britain, Italy, The Netherlands, Spain and The United States attended seeking membership in IFUW.

From the onset, IFUW used the League of Nations as a platform to evoke change. Through connections with the League of Nations, IFUW became acquainted with other organisations focusing on women's empowerment or education. Key questions that IFUW focused on in the early years surrounded disarmament, unemployment of educated women and nationality of married women.

== Name Change ==
The International Federation of University Women (IFUW) became Graduate Women International (GWI) in April 2015 after 96 years as an organisation. The change in name reflects the desire to promote inclusivity. Graduate Women International sought to represent the contemporary diversity and inclusion of the members on an international scale, while promoting the focus of education for women and girls.

== Governance ==
GWI is a membership-driven organisation with a headquarters in Geneva, Switzerland. GWI has a small and dedicated central team that serves its members and works on programs and advocacy.

The General Assembly takes place every three years and elects its board of officers, Committee members and Conveners for the next triennium. The Triennial Conferences occur in a different location than the previous meeting. In 2019, the Triennial Conference took place in Geneva and the 2016 Triennial Conference met in Cape Town, South Africa. The Board of Officers and all committee members are volunteers. There are seven committees that cover various aspects of GWI operations, membership and reach. There is the International Fellowships Committee, Finance Committee, Education Committee, Membership Committee, Resolutions Committee, Hegg Hoffet Fund Committee and Project Development Committee.

GWI is financed mainly by its membership dues. Other funding is also provided in the form of grants or donations. GWI utilises GlobalGiving as a donation platform for specific projects, such as Rural Teachers for Rural Futures.

== Activities ==
GWI runs a fellowship cycle at least once a triennium, which funds PhD students only. GWI's Hegg-Hoffett Fund for Displaced Women Graduates assists graduate women (in special cases tertiary women students) who have been displaced as a result of war, political upheaval or other serious emergencies. The Hegg-Hoffett fund provides small short term grants for refresher courses for re-entry into the candidates' professional field. GWI carries out advocacy and communications campaigns focused on its mission, as well as projects aiming to strengthen girls' and women's access to education. GWI's members run grass roots projects providing girls and women with training, mentorship, and skill building.

=== Resolutions ===
At every Triennial Conference, GWI passes resolutions urging member organisations to focus on key issues and push their governments for change. The most recent conference, in 2022, resulted in ten new resolutions. These resolutions guide GWI's statements at the United Nations as well as at conferences and guide recommendations and advice to national affiliations and associations (NFAs).

== Programmes ==
GWI advocates for women's rights, equality and empowerment through various programmes. GWI currently supports multiple active programmes.

=== Bina Roy Partners in Development (BRPID) ===
BRPID awards grants to GWI national federations and associations (NFAs) from developing countries on a competitive basis to promote GWI's mission. Donations from impact investors, personal contributions and member affiliates support the Bina Roy projects. In the latest round of funding, BRPID funded programmes in six countries: Democratic Republic of Congo, El Salvador, Ghana, India, Mexico and Turkey.

=== Teachers for Rural Futures ===
GWI provides scholarships and mentoring support, through Teachers for Rural Futures, to young women from Buyende District in Eastern Uganda, a rural area where the majority of girls do not complete secondary school, for them to become qualified teachers and promote girls' education. The competitive programme allows women to achieve their dreams of becoming secondary school teachers and to promote girls' education and empowerment.

=== Twinning Programme ===
Twinning is a formal collaboration between two organisations or groups. Through GWI's Twinning Programme, NFAs can establish formal twinning partnerships for a specific focus and amount of time. Twinning pools resources to collaborate to achieve a common goal on a specific project. Long-term benefits include the formation of a stronger relationship between two NFAs.

== Notable people ==
- Winifred Cullis, English physician, president
- Virginia Gildersleeve, American academic, co-founder
- Ellen Gleditsch, Norwegian radiochemist and Norway's second female professor. Started her career as an assistant to Marie Curie.
- Dame Margaret Kidd, Scottish advocate, vice-president
- Elizabeth Stoffregen May, American economist, president
- Frances Moran, Irish legal scholar, president
- Dame Daphne Purves, New Zealand teacher, president
- Amy Rustomjee, Indian educator, vice-president
- Ethel Sargant, English botanist, president
- Rose Sidgwick, English historian, co-founder
- Caroline Spurgeon, English literary critic, co-founder
- Helen C. White, American literary scholar, vice-president
- Karolina Widerström, Swedish gynaecologist
- Helle Lambridis, Greek educator and philosopher
- Marie Curie, internationally renowned French scientist
- Birgit Vennesland, Norwegian-American biochemist
- Marie of Romania, the final queen of Romania
