= Elizabeth Stoffregen May =

American economist and advocate of female education (1907–2011)

- Elizabeth Stoffregen (later May), from the 1928 yearbook of Smith College
- Born: April 25, 1907; St. Louis, Missouri, U.S.
- Died: March 27, 2011 (aged 103); Harvard, Massachusetts, U.S.
- Occupation: Economist

Elizabeth Stoffregen May (April 25, 1907 – March 27, 2011) was an American economist, academic and advocate of education for women.

== Family ==
Born on April 25, 1907, in St. Louis, Missouri, May was the eldest of four sisters. Her mother was Caroline Stumpf and her father was Carl Henry Stoffregen, the second generation head of Steinwender, Stoffregen & Co., a coffee-roasting and importing company.

== Education and early career ==
As a student, May had a keen interest in international affairs, and after graduating from Smith College in 1928, she studied at the London School of Economics, earning a Ph.D. in 1931. That same year she began teaching economics at Goucher College in Baltimore, Maryland. In 1939 she joined the federal government, working as a general assistant for economic analysis in the Treasury Department and as a fiscal analyst in the Bureau of the Budget (1941–1947). In 1947 she relocated to Greece with her husband, Geoffrey May, as part of the American Mission for Aid to Greece to help administer the U.S. economic and military assistance to the Greek government. Returning to the U.S. in 1949, May served as professor of economics and academic dean at Wheaton College in Norton, Massachusetts (1949–1964). From 1961 to 1969, she served as First Vice-President of the American Association of University Women (AAUW) and in 1968 she was elected Third Vice-President of the International Federation of University Women (IFUW). Later she served as First Vice-President (1971–1974) and President (1974–1977).

May was appointed as director of the Export-Import Bank of the United States by President Lyndon B. Johnson in 1967, the first female director in that office. In 1969 she joined forces with six other women to found the Virginia Gildersleeve International Foundation for University Women (later the Virginia Gildersleeve International Fund).

== Retirement ==
In 1977, May retired to Harvard, Massachusetts, where she dedicated her time to town activities, including serving as a member of the town's Long Range Planning Advisory Committee. May died in her home in Harvard, Massachusetts, on March 27, 2011.
