= Sedgwick =

Sedgwick may refer to:

== People ==
- Sedgwick (surname)

== Places ==
=== Australia ===
- Sedgwick, Victoria

=== England ===
- Sedgwick, Cumbria, England
- Sedgwick, West Sussex, England
- Sidgwick Avenue, Cambridge, England

=== United States ===
- Sedgwick, Arkansas
- Sedgwick, Colorado
- Sedgwick, Kansas
- Sedgwick, Maine
- Sedgwick, Missouri
- Sedgwick, Wisconsin
- Sedgwick County, Colorado
- Sedgwick County, Kansas
- Sedgwick Avenue, Bronx, New York
- Sedgwick Township, Harvey County, Kansas

== Schools ==
- Sedgwick Middle School in West Hartford, Connecticut
- Sedgwick Elementary School in Cupertino, California

== Transport ==
- Sedgwick station (CTA), a Chicago 'L' station
- Sedgwick station (SEPTA), a commuter rail station in Philadelphia

== Companies ==
- Sedgwick Group, a British insurance broker

== See also ==
- Sedgewick (disambiguation)
