= Caroline Spurgeon =

English literary critic and academic (1869–1942)

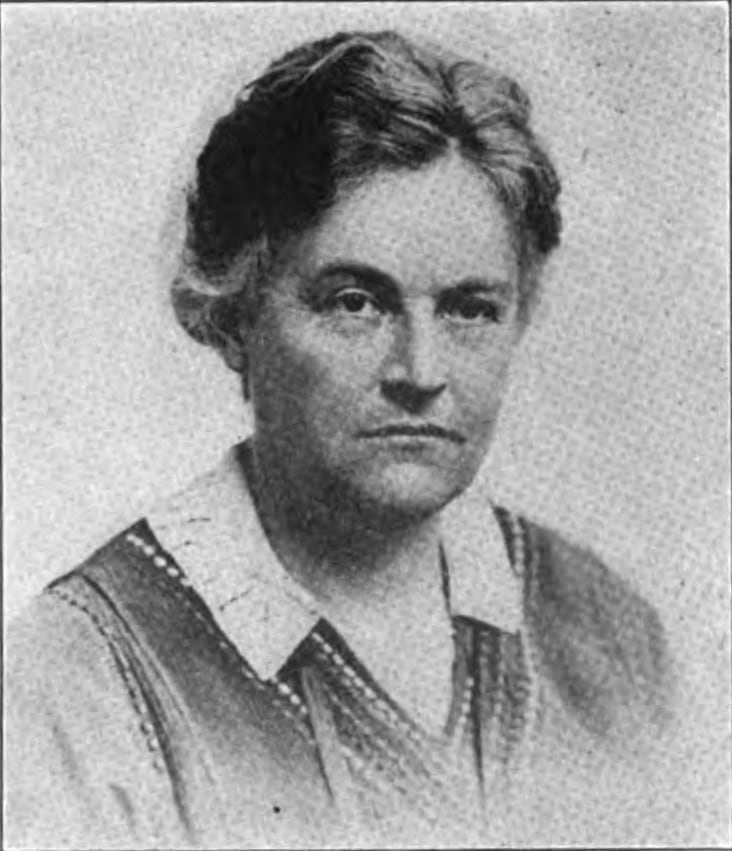
- Born: Caroline Frances Eleanor Spurgeon; 24 October 1869; India
- Died: 24 October 1942 (aged 73); Tucson, Arizona, U.S.
- Education: Cheltenham Ladies' College; King's College London; University College London
- Occupations: literary critic, professor
- Employer(s): University of London; Bedford College, London
- Known for: Expert on William Shakespeare and Geoffrey Chaucer
- Notable work: Shakespeare's Imagery and What it Tells Us

Caroline Frances Eleanor Spurgeon (24 October 1869, India – 24 October 1942, Tucson, Arizona) was an English literary critic. In 1913, she was appointed Hildred Carlisle Professor of English at the University of London and became head of the Department of English at Bedford College, London. She was the first woman to be awarded a chair at the University of London, and only the third in Britain (after Edith Morley and Millicent Mackenzie). She co-founded the International Federation of University Women with Virginia Gildersleeve.

== Life ==
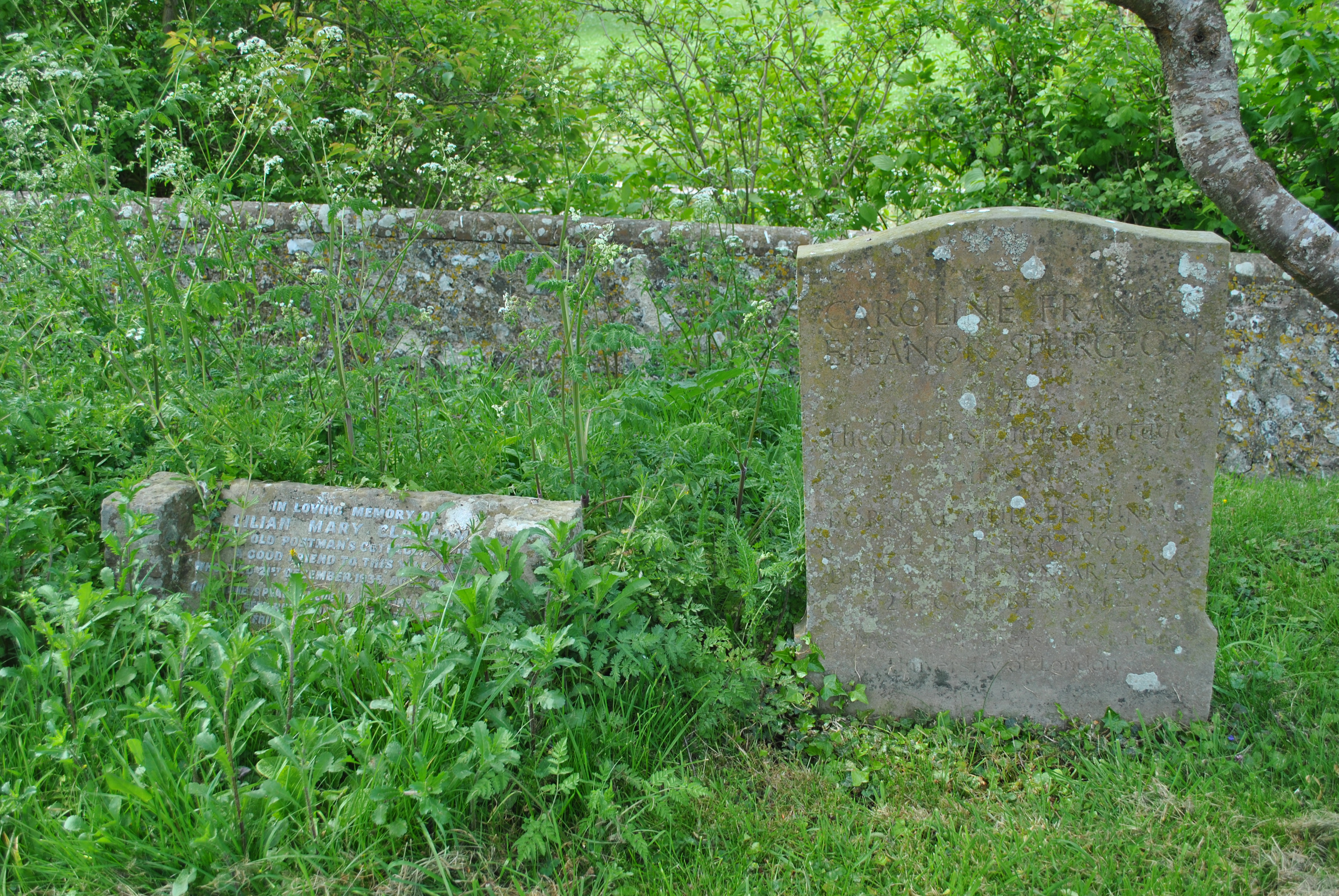
Alciston Parish Church, Alciston, 2017

Caroline Spurgeon was educated at Cheltenham Ladies' College, Dresden and at King's College London and University College London.

She is known as the first female university professor in London, the second in England. She was the first female professor of English Literature (Edith Morley was given the inaccurate title "Professor of English Language"). From May 1900, she lectured on English Literature in London. She became a member of the staff of Bedford College, London, in 1901, and successfully competed for the newly created chair for English literature in 1913.

She was an expert on William Shakespeare and Geoffrey Chaucer. Her thesis, published in 1911 in Paris, was on Chaucer devant la critique, and in 1929 in London on 500 years of Chaucer criticism and allusion. Her most famous work, Shakespeare's Imagery and What it Tells Us (1935) is a methodologically innovative compendium and analysis of poetic images.

In 1936, she settled in Tucson, Arizona, where she died, on her 73rd birthday from cerebral arteriosclerosis. After World War II, her "intimate friend" Virginia Gildersleeve moved her body to be buried alongside her longtime companion Lilian Mary Clapham (1871 – 21 December 1935) at Alciston Parish Church, Alciston, United Kingdom.

== English studies ==
Smart networking in the British Federation of University Women and with female counterparts in the more progressive United States helped her gain leadership positions in the restructuring of English studies in Britain (e.g., the English Association) as well as in the launching of the English literature curriculum at the University of London. Through her various professional activities inside her own department, she participated in the academic literary-critical renaissance of the 1920s and early 1930s. She was also an active militant in favour of women's eligibility to academic degrees. She advocated for more opportunities for foreign women in British universities. Her own appointment to a professorial chair marked a turning point in the history of women's higher education.

== Chaucer reception ==
Spurgeon's 1911 Paris doctoral dissertation, Chaucer devant la critique en Angleterre et en France depuis son temps jusqu' nos jours, which she published in three volumes in English in 1929, Five Hundred Years of Chaucer Criticism and Allusion, 1357–1900, secured her a lasting place in the history of scholarship on the Middle English author. The study made available to her colleagues the rich tapestry of the reception of the father of English poetry.

== Shakespeare's imagery ==
In 1935, Spurgeon wrote the pioneer study on the use of images in William Shakespeare's work, called Shakespeare's Imagery, and what it tells us. It has been reprinted several times. In it she analyses the different types of images and motifs that he uses in his plays. She also shows that there is a "cluster", or there are several "clusters", of images in each of the major plays, for instance, illness and injury images in Hamlet, and light and darkness images in Romeo and Juliet.

Some examples may here suffice:

- sea images: e.g. "Sailing in this salt flood; the winds, the sighs ... will overset thy tempest-tossed body" (Romeo and Juliet)
- clothing images: e.g. "Why do you dress me in borrowed robes" (Macbeth)
- colour images: "this my hand will rather The multitudinous seas incarnadine, Making the green one red." (Macbeth)
- gardening images: "Hang here like a fruit, my soul, till the tree die." (Cymbeline)

The study of imagery can, apart from helping to understand the meaning of the play, give some insight into the poet's mind, because it shows what ideas come to his mind when in need of poetic expression, thus giving some clues as to his background, his upbringing, his social position, and so on.

It can also often help to distinguish his style from that of other authors, and thus is an instrument in debunking the theory that Francis Bacon may be the author of Shakespeare's plays, since a statistical comparison between the fields of imagery in both authors shows revealing differences.

Fredson Bowers complained that Spurgeon, in her study of Shakespeare's imagery, did not take into account "that some of the images she uses as evidence for her thesis are editorial emendations and not necessarily Shakespeare's words—and that she did not attempt to assess the purity of the evidence she was collecting by using an edition that would show her what was editorial and what not."
