= Ethel Sidgwick =

British writer (1877–1970)

- Ethel Sidgwick (20 Oct 1915)
- Born: 20 December 1877; Rugby, Warwickshire
- Died: 29 April 1970 (aged 92)
- Parents: Arthur Sidgwick (father); Charlotte Sophia Wilson (mother)
- Relatives: Frank Sidgwick; Rose Sidgwick; Hugh Sidgwick; Margaret Sidgwick
- Writing career
- Occupations: Novelist; poet; playwright; translator; biographer
- Years active: 1909–1939
- Genres: Literary fiction, Plays, Children's literature Romance novel, Biography
- Notable works: Le gentleman: an idyll of the quarter (1911); Succession; a comedy of the generations (1913); Jamesie (1918)

Ethel Sidgwick (20 December 1877 – 29 April 1970) was a British novelist, poet, playwright, translator, biographer and peace activist. Sidgwick wrote over twenty plays, novels, stories, and nonfiction books during her lifetime.

== Personal life ==
Sidgwick was born on 20 December 1877 in Rugby to Arthur Sidgwick and Charlotte Sophia Wilson. Arthur Sidgwick was an educational reformer and suffragist who worked for Oxford's Association for the Education of Women.

She was the second oldest of five siblings: Rose Sidgwick (1877-1918), a professor; Frank Sidgwick (1879-1939), a publisher and poet; Margaret Sidgwick (1881-1948); and Hugh Sidgwick (1882-1917), scholar and Royal Garrison Artillery captain. Ethel Sidgwick was born 11 months after Rose Sidgwick.

Sidgwick was also the niece of physics and psychical researcher and principal of Newnham College Eleanor Sidgwick, and feminist philosopher and co-founder of Newnham College Henry Sidgwick.

Sidgwick completed her education at Oxford High School.

== Writing career ==
Sidgwick worked as teacher and writer.

In 1909, Sidgwick published "Thackeray's Rose and the Ring, Dramatised in two acts" in the play anthology Plays for Schools. The play was her first of many for a child audience. Sidgwick published this play and many of her other works through her brother Frank Sidgwick's publishing house Sidgwick & Jackson.

In 1910, Sidgwick wrote her first novel Promise. Promise is about Antoine, a "young musical genius, half English, half French" who is considered a 'child of promise,' and his older brother, Philip. Sidgwick followed up the novel with a sequel, Succession: A Comedy of the Generations in 1913.

Sidgwick also worked as a translator, translating A History of the French People in 1923.

Her last book was a biography of Eleanor Sidgwick, Mrs. Henry Sidgwick: A Memoir, in 1938. Sidgwick died on April 29, 1970. She never married.

=== Reception ===
Reginald Brimley Johnson in his Some Contemporary Novelists (Women) described Sidgwick's writing style.

The essence of Miss Sidgwick is her instinct for Literature.... Our appreciation depends on a quick intellect, familiarity with art atmosphere and book-language, a low of the fine shades. In structure and style she is not realistic; she frankly composes; yet, in her own way, lays bare the soul. She is modern: because she does not concern herself with single emotions, whole characters, a crude clash of black and white. She is never melodramatic. Nor does the narrative make up one centralized plot. It grows out of the immense complexities and interchange which super-civilization imposes on human-nature. The persons of the drama are pulled in a thousand different directions, by circumstances, place, and standards; growing out of intellectual activity, a cultured outlook, inherited standards... It is supreme art, admirably controlled.

— Reginald Brimley Johnson, Some Contemporary Novelists (Women), p. 105-106

Dr. Sarah Londsdale wrote for The Neglected Books Page that "Ethel Sidgwick makes great demands of her readers. Her meaning is like a will o’ the wisp, darting in the darkness of her elliptical prose. She is always several paces ahead of the reader, who feels as if they are dully plodding behind, in danger of losing their way completely."

== Selected works ==
Jamesie (1918)

- Thackeray's Rose and the Ring, Dramatised in two acts (1909)
- Promise (1910). OL 7126094M
- Le Gentleman: An Idyll of the Quarter (1911). OL 7052440M
- Herself (1912). OL 6543234M
- Succession; a comedy of the generations (1913). OL 13509719M
- Four Plays for Children: The Rose and the Ring, the Goody-Witch, the Goosegirl, Boots and the North Wind (1913). OL 18397879M
- A Lady of Leisure (1914). OL 6565402M
- Duke Jones (1914). OL 7132664M
- The Accolade (1915). OL 7188659M
- Hatchways (1916). OL 6591636M
- Jamesie (1918). OL 7085531M
- Madam (1921). OL 6632992M
- Two plays for schools: The three golden hairs, The robber bridegroom (1922). OL 7180864M
- The three golden hairs: (more plays for children) (1922). OL 7134879M
- Restoration: the fairy-tale of a farm (1923). OL 14973594M LCCN 23-7990
- Laura, a cautionary story (1924). OL 17355897M
- When I grow rich (1928). OL 17788970M
- The bells of Shoreditch (1928). OL 61035404M OCLC 4839507
- A tale of two villages (1931). OL 6764818M LCCN 31-28161
- Dorothy's wedding: a tale of two villages (1931). OL17355868M
- Mrs. Henry Sidgwick: a memoir (1938). OL13725072M
