= Edith Morley =

English literary scholar and suffragette (1875–1964)

Edith J. Morley
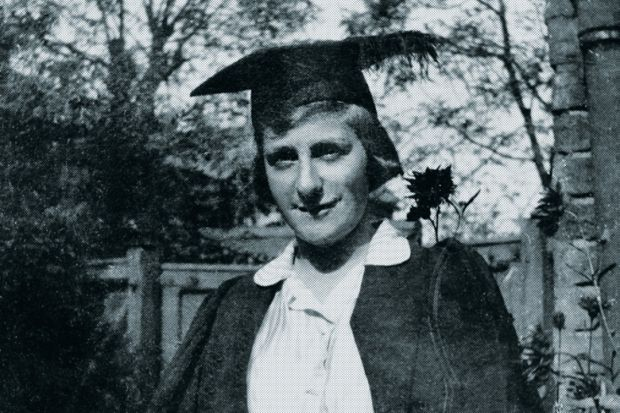
- Morley in her college gown, c. 1893
- Born: 1875; United Kingdom
- Died: 1964 (aged 88)
- Citizenship: United Kingdom
- Known for: Works about Henry Crabb Robinson
- Awards: Order of the British Empire (1950)

Academic background
- Education: Somerville College, Oxford

Academic work
- Institutions: University College, Reading; University of Reading

Edith Julia Morley, OBE (13 September 1875–18 January 1964) was a literary scholar and activist. She was the first woman British Professor, appointed in 1908 at University College, Reading, now the University of Reading. She was the main twentieth century editor of the works of Henry Crabb Robinson. She was a Professor of English Language until 1940. She was a socialist and member of the Fabian Society, active in various suffrage campaigns, and received an OBE for her efforts coordinating Reading's refugee programme during the Second World War.

== Birth, childhood, and family life ==
Edith Julia Morley was born at 25 Craven Hill Gardens, Bayswater, central London, in 1875. The house belonged to her grandmother, and the family rented it from her. Morley was the fourth of six children to her mother Leah Reyser (1840-1926) and her father Alexander Morley (d. 1915), a surgeon-dentist. She describes her eldest sibling, which was her sister as "an invalid". There were twenty-five years between the eldest and the youngest children.

She recalled in her memoir that she had not liked being a girl, being impatient of the restrictions placed on her activities by Victorian notions of decorum, such as wearing gloves and a veil to preserve her complexion.

The family home had nine bedrooms, and on Morley's "coming-out dance" comfortably accommodated 250 people. The family had a telephone installed in 1903 or 1904, which Morley notes was earlier than most of their friends.

== Education ==
From the age of five Morley was sent to a local kindergarten which was run by a natural history enthusiast, nicknamed "Brownie" by the family. She spent "long and happy hours" at the Natural History Museum, London, recalling a memorable experience of being asked to tea by the Director and helping him and his assistant identify shells. She wrote that she "was fully convinced that they needed my assistance", and was pleased that her brother hadn't been similarly invited. She described it as a "delightful and wonderful experience and one which filled me with self-importance".

Morley received a comprehensive education. Her father wanted her to be educated at home by a governess, but she insisted on being sent to school. She was sent to Boarding School for three years and was then educated at Doreck College, Kensington, for four years. At the age of 14, she was sent to Hanover to learn German and to be "turned into a 'young lady' and acquire some of the feminine accomplishments I refused to have anything to do with at home". Her teaching was entirely in German, and she learned German, French, English Literature, universal history and history of art. She was not instructed in Latin, mathematics, or science, noting that absence would also have been reflected in private schools in England.

In 1892, she took a course at King's College London Ladies Department, where her abilities were noticed and it was suggested that she transfer to the Oxford Honour School of English and English Literature, alongside Caroline F. E. Spurgeon. She was a member of Somerville College. Although she was placed in the first class following examination in 1899, women were not allowed to matriculate from Oxford at the time and she was awarded an "equivalent" degree rather than a standard Oxford degree. Along with the few other women at Oxford University in that period, she was kept rather isolated, with limited access to the university's resources. She was later awarded an Associateship of King's College. In 1926 she was granted an Oxford honorary MA degree.

== Career ==
Morley began teaching at King's College in 1899, taking a class in Gothic and Germanic philology.

The difficulties Morley experienced getting an education helped to shape her political views towards Fabianism and she joined the Fabian Society around 1908 and became a member of the Fabian Executive Committee in 1914. She was also a champion of women's rights, arguing that marriage and motherhood were used to hold women back from professional careers. In her 1914 book Women Workers in Seven Professions, she describes how women academics tend to be found in restricted markets like women's colleges, creating a situation of artificial scarcity under which women are forced to compete against each other (rather than against both men and women) for the few available resources.

Morley was an active although not an exhibitionist suffragist. She refused to pay her taxes in protest at having no vote and had her goods seized by the authorities. She also refused to take part in the 1911 census for the same reason and she spent the night of the census walking up and down the main street in Aldeburgh with Elizabeth Garrett Anderson.

Morley took the poet Wilfred Owen under her wing, allowing him to sit in on her lectures and encouraging him to (unsuccessfully) apply for a scholarship. In his letters he notes that she gave him feedback on his writing long after he left Reading.

Morley had joined Reading College (later University College, Reading) in 1901 as part-time teacher of German and Anglo-Saxon and by 1903 she had progressed through Assistant Lecturer to become Lecturer in English Language and Literature. In 1907, however, she was the only woman and the only lecturer responsible for a subject not to be made a professor. Morley threatened to resign. Following drawn-out negotiations, she was appointed Professor of English Language at the University College in Reading in 1908, becoming the first woman appointed to a chair at an English university-level institution. The use of "English Language" in her title left the door open for a man to take up the post of Professor of English Literature at a later date, and Morley was aware that her post would not be renewed when she retired.

She encountered prejudice from the male academic and literary establishments. After being appointed to the professorship she was denied a male assistant: the authorities declared that no male academic could be expected to work under a woman. After she had addressed the committee of the English Association "interminably, her face radiant and moist, on the theory and practice of English teaching", A. C. Bradley commented to John Bailey, "It is a pity, besides being rather strange, that poor Miss Morley herself cannot write a paragraph of tolerable English". She held the Reading professorship until 1940, by which time the erstwhile University College had become the University of Reading. Her speciality was English literature, and for many years she regularly published a lengthy roundup of recent scholarship in her field under the heading "The Eighteenth Century" in the bibliographical review entitled The Year's Work in English Studies. She is known for her comprehensive 1935 biography of the writer and traveller Henry Crabb Robinson and as the primary 20th century editor of Robinson's writings.

== Awards, honours and remembrance ==
In 1950, she was made an Officer of the Order of the British Empire (OBE), an honour awarded for her work establishing the Reading Refugee Committee and assisting Belgian Jewish refugees in World War II. She convinced the University of Reading and other organisations to provide scholarships for Jewish refugees of student age. Morley also helped establish a hostel for young Jewish refugees in Reading. For this work, she was included among the hundred or so women in Sybil Oldfield's book Doers of the Word: A Biographical Dictionary of British Women Humanitarians Active Between 1900–1950.

The University of Reading holds a collection of her papers, including correspondence (1914–1939), lecture notebooks (1893–1914), photographs, and a memoir entitled Looking Before and After, which was published posthumously in 2016. In 2014, the university held her up as a role model during its celebration of International Women's Day. An annual lecture was established in her honour.

The Edith Morley Annual Lecture has been given by:

- 2015 - Laura Tobin and Rhianna Dhillon
- 2016 - Karen Blackett
- 2017 - Penny Mordaunt MP
- 2018 - Polly Vacher MBE
- 2019 - Laura Bates
- 2023 - Professor Nazanin Derakhshan
- 2024 - Dr Rhian Taylor
- 2025 - Mathilda Hodgkins-Byrne
- 2026 - Dr Alice Mpofu-Coles

The University of Reading's Humanities and Social Sciences Building was renamed the Edith Morley Building in 2017. In 2026, a national blue plaque was put up at her former home on Kendrick Road in Reading.

In November 2026, Historic England unveiled a blue plaque to her on her long-time home in Kendrick Road, Reading.

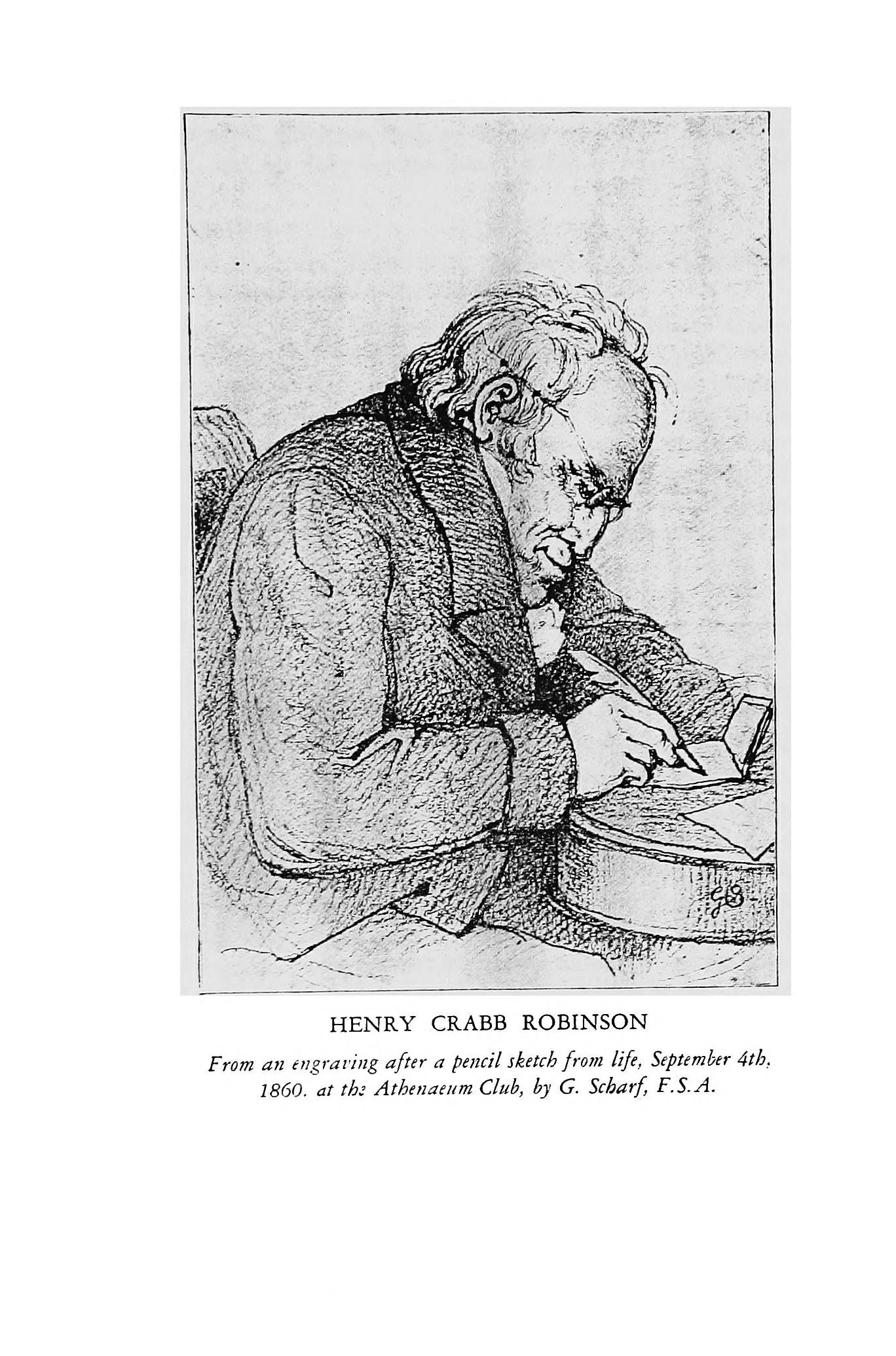
Portrait of Henry Crabb Robinson in Blake, Coleridge, Wordsworth, Lamb, etc., being selections from the Remains of Henry Crabb Robinson

== Books ==
- The Works of Sir Philip Sidney (1901)
- Women Workers in Seven Professions: A Survey of Their Economic Conditions and Prospects (1914)
- Blake, Coleridge, Wordsworth, Lamb, Etc., Being Selections from the Remains of Henry Crabb Robinson (1922)
- The Life and Times of Henry Crabb Robinson (1935)
- John Cunningham, 1729–1773 (1942)
- Edith Morley, Before and After. Reminiscences of a Working Life, edited by Barbara Morris, foreword by Mary Beard (Reading: Two Rivers Press, 2016)
