= Virginia Gildersleeve =

American academic (1877–1965)

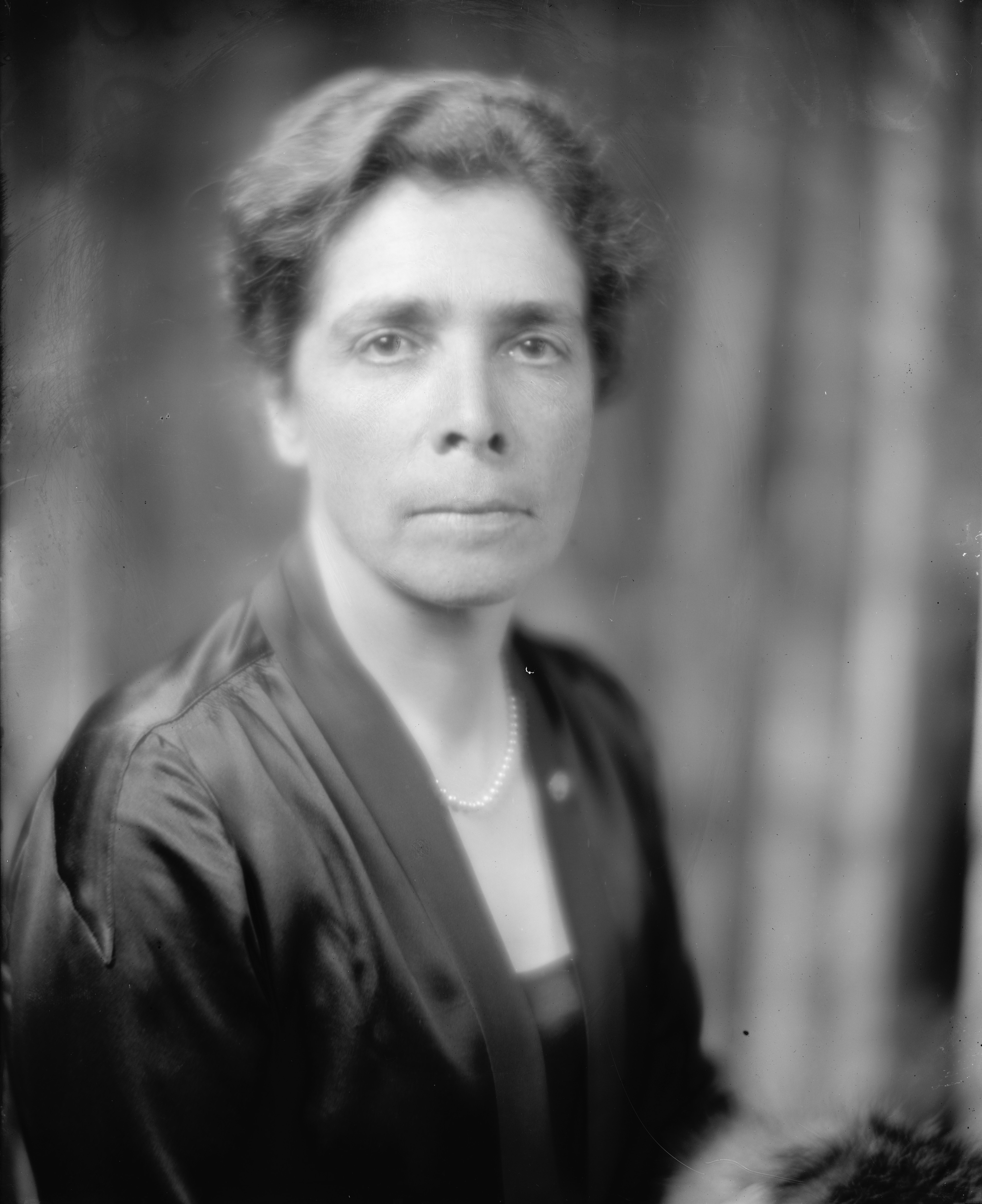
- Virginia C. Gildersleeve (Harris & Ewing/LOC hec.21309)
- Born: Virginia Crocheron Gildersleeve; October 3, 1877; New York City, U.S.
- Died: July 7, 1965 (aged 87); Centerville, Massachusetts
- Education: Barnard College; Columbia University
- Known for: Academic; College dean United Nations charter and creation delegation appointee

Virginia Crocheron Gildersleeve (October 3, 1877 – July 7, 1965) was an American academic, the long-time dean of Barnard College, co-founder of the International Federation of University Women, and the only woman delegated by United States to the April 1945 San Francisco United Nations Conference on International Organization, which negotiated the charter for and creation of the United Nations.

== Biography ==
Virginia Gildersleeve was born in New York City into a prominent New York family. Her father, Henry Alger Gildersleeve, was a jurist who served on the state Supreme court. She attended the Brearley School and following her graduation in 1895, went on to attend Barnard College, a member of the Seven Sisters affiliated with Columbia University. She completed her studies in 1899 and received a fellowship to undertake research for her Master of Arts degree in medieval history at Columbia University. She taught English part-time at Barnard for several years. She declined a full-time position and took a leave of absence to undertake her Ph.D. in English and comparative literature at Columbia for three years. When she completed her studies in 1908, she was appointed a lecturer in English in 1908 by Barnard and Columbia; by 1910, she had become an assistant professor and, in 1911, she was made dean of Barnard College.

In 1918 Gildersleeve, Caroline Spurgeon, and Rose Sidgwick met while the two English women were on an academic exchange to the United States. They discussed founding an international association of university women, and in 1919, founded the International Federation of University Women. Gildersleeve and Spurgeon developed a close friendship and annually, shared a rental summer home.

Following World War I, Gildersleeve became interested in international politics. She campaigned for Al Smith and Franklin D. Roosevelt. During World War II she chaired the advisory council of the navy unit for women, the WAVES, and following the war, she was appointed to the United Nations Charter Committee. She was involved in the reconstruction of higher education in Japan. For this work she received France's Legion of Honor.

== Dean of Barnard College ==
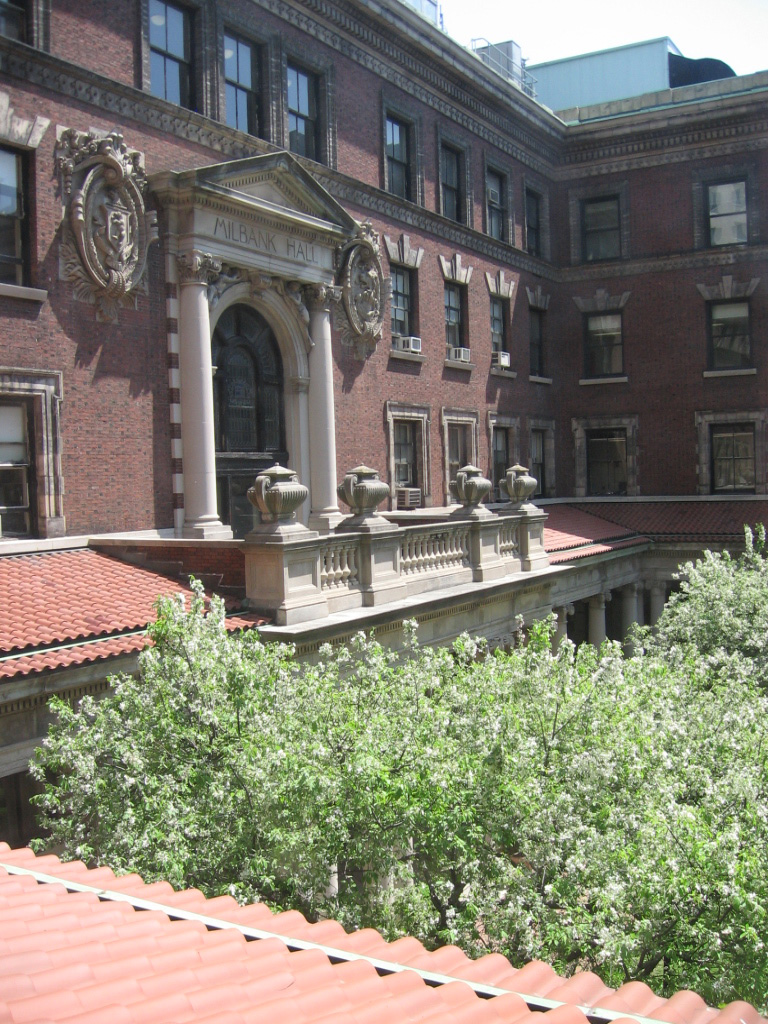
Barnard College

Throughout her tenure as dean of Barnard College, Gildersleeve worked to advance women's rights by championing their access to the professional school at Columbia and to its best professors. This included hiring Charles A. Beard, a young Columbia instructor in 1914 to teach Barnard's first course in American government so that Barnard graduates would be eligible to attend the Columbia School of Journalism. At the beginning of World War I, she hired the head of Columbia's anthropology department, Franz Boas, when he was threatened with being fired because of his objections to World War I. Professor Boas was a Jewish immigrant from Germany and a socialist. Among the Barnard undergraduates, Boas headed the department that included several of the century's most outstanding anthropologists, including Margaret Mead.

Barnard only had a few African-American students during Gildersleeve's tenure. Zora Neale Hurston was a pioneer in 1925, who attended Barnard with assistance from her literary mentor Fannie Hurst and Barnard College co-founder Annie Nathan Meyer. In the early 1940s, out of her own pocket, Dean Gildersleeve paid for the full scholarship of at least one African-American student from Harlem. Enrollment of Jewish students at Columbia College had reached 40 percent before World War I. Gildersleeve opposed religious exclusivity and refused to openly categorize Barnard students, but reportedly took steps to reduce the number of Jewish students. In the 1930s, roughly 20 percent of Barnard students were Jewish, compared to 6 to 10 percent at most other women's colleges. According to Gildersleeve's biographer Rosalind Rosenberg, at that time, both Columbia and Barnard began recruiting students from outside New York City. They evaluated applicants on the basis of psychological tests, interviews, and letters of recommendation, as well as academic criteria. In the two decades before World War II, this process of selective admissions reduced the percentage of Jewish students at Columbia to match the 20 percent at Barnard.

== Politics and foreign affairs ==
Even though the Barnard College board of trustees believed that "marching in a parade would be a shocking and shameful thing" for women students to do, and some school administrators considered political activism "unladylike" and "too sordid for a refined woman," Gildersleeve encouraged faculty and students to engage in all the political movements of the day.

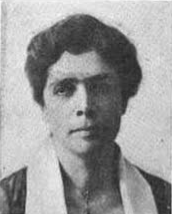
Virginia Gildersleeve, 1921

During World War I, Gildersleeve contributed vigorously to wartime civil defense activities in New York City. She was an early and strong supporter of the formation of the League of Nations. On February 22, 1918, Gildersleeve called for "some ordered system of international government, backed by power enough to give authority to its decrees."

When Germany invaded Poland in 1939, Gildersleeve was a strong interventionist.

In 1942, early in World War II, Gildersleeve was instrumental in founding the WAVES ("Women Accepted for Volunteer Emergency Service"). Its second in command was Gildersleeve's companion, English Professor Elizabeth Reynard. All of its members—90,000 in all—were college graduates.

In 1945, President Franklin D. Roosevelt named Gildersleeve to the U.S. delegation to write the United Nations Charter. Gildersleeve learned of her appointment from her cook-housekeeper, who heard it on the radio. She was the only woman named to the U.S. delegation. The delegates were instructed to address two issues: 1) the need to prevent future wars through the creation of a Security Council; and 2) the need to enhance human welfare, which they accomplished through the establishment of the United Nations Economic and Social Council (ECOSOC). Gildersleeve sought and received drafting responsibility for the work of this second council—the one, as she put it, in charge of "doing things rather than preventing things from being done." She was able to insert into the charter the following goals for people around the world: "higher standards of living, full employment, and conditions of economic and social progress and development." She also persuaded the delegates to adopt the following aim for the United Nations: "universal respect for human rights and fundamental freedoms for all without distinction as to race, sex, language, or religion." She insisted for the charter to require the appointment of the Commission on Human Rights, which under the direction of Eleanor Roosevelt, wrote the Universal Declaration of Human Rights three years later.

Having been invited by General Douglas MacArthur, in March 1946, Gildersleeve served as a member of the U.S. Educational Mission to Japan. She was respected in Japan for having been the only American woman delegate at the San Francisco founding conference.

Some historians consider Gildersleeve to have been "the most influential leader" of the Christian "anti-Zionist lobby" of her era. Gildersleeve wrote that "after (her) retirement from the Deanship at Barnard, (she) devoted (her)self mainly to the Middle East", describing herself as "struggling ardently against" the creation of and, later, the continued existence of the Jewish State. She blamed her failure to prevent the creation of the State of Israel on "the Zionist control of the media of communication." Gildersleeve repeatedly testified before congressional committees and lobbied members of Congress and President Harry Truman to deny American political, military, and financial support to Israel. Gildersleeve was a trustee of the American University of Beirut and a leading figure in the Christian opposition to Israel's statehood in 1948. She helped found and chaired the Committee for Justice and Peace in the Holy Land, which merged into the American Friends of the Middle East. According to the historian Robert Moats Miller of the University of North Carolina, the group was funded by the Central Intelligence Agency and ARAMCO. Miller states that Gildersleeve's "sympathies were indeed overwhelmingly with the Arabs."

== Women's equality ==
Gildersleeve was an early advocate of paid leaves of absence for women faculty members to take maternity leave. In 1931, she raised the matter with Columbia President Butler, who "looked a little startled", but he agreed, saying "We should have women teachers with fuller lives and richer experience, not so many dried-up old maids". Gildersleeve recorded this remark in her memoir without comment. She then persuaded the Barnard board of trustees to enact a maternity policy that provided one term off at full pay or a year off at half pay for all new mothers among the faculty. In the first year, three women took advantage of this new policy.

In 1915, in a speech to the Columbia Chapter of Phi Beta Kappa she challenged the commonly held belief that the education of women was a detriment to society, arguing that improved public health and the declining infant mortality made it unnecessary to breed so many children as once had been the case in order to have surviving progeny. She asserted that in the modern world women could have the same ambitions as men.

Rosalind Rosenberg, Gildersleeve's biographer, has argued that "Through her work Gildersleeve and other pioneers like her provided the essential conditions necessary to winning for women full equality with men in American society and throughout the world... In broadening women's scholarly horizons, Gildersleeve laid the groundwork for some of the most innovative scholarship of the twentieth century. And in helping to draft the charter of the UN, Gildersleeve assured that the issues to which she had devoted her career on Morningside Heights would be addressed throughout the world in the decades that followed. By insisting that women have the right to every educational opportunity open to men, and by fighting her whole life to secure that opportunity, she helped establish the bedrock on which feminists have been building ever since."

== Sexuality ==
For several decades Gildersleeve and Professor Caroline Spurgeon shared a summer retreat. Later, she lived with the Barnard English professor, Elizabeth Reynard, and they both are buried at Saint Matthew's Episcopal Churchyard, Bedford, New York. This has given some a basis to speculate about Gildersleeve's sexuality. In her 1954 memoir, Gildersleeve protested the "particularly cruel and unwholesome discrimination against unmarried women" who chose to spend their lives living with other women. She attributed this trend to "the less responsible psychologists and psychiatrists of the day", who voiced "disrespect for spinsters in the teaching profession as 'inhibited' and 'frustrated'". Gildersleeve used "celibate" to describe her status.

== International Federation of University Women ==
Gildersleeve and Spurgeon met just after the First World War ended, when a delegation of British educators came to the United States. Caroline Spurgeon, a highly respected Shakespeare scholar who published many books and papers about both Chaucer and Shakespeare, taught at Bedford College for Women, part of the University of London. They collaborated in establishing an organization that would foster international cooperation among like-minded academic women. Gildersleeve imagined an organization built on the model of the American Association of Collegiate Alumnae and the British Federation of University Women. In 1919, they created the International Federation of university Women (IFUW), housing it in London with a second home in Paris at Reid Hall. For two decades, between World War I and World War II, Gildersleeve worked through the IFUW to keep alive the spirit of international understanding, even as isolationism gripped her country. They believed that the women of the world could make change by discussion with and learning from each other.

== Tributes ==
In 1969, eleven members of the International Federation of University Women founded the Virginia Gildersleeve International Fund (VGIF).(See http://www.vgif.org). To date, the fund has awarded more than 400 grants for a total project aid disbursement of more than US$1.8 million to women's groups in low-per-capita-income countries. Priority is given to income generation and community development projects that enhance and exercise women's educational, vocational, and leadership skills. Project activities range from seminars, conferences, and training workshops, to community-action projects.

== Published works ==
- Gildersleeve, Virginia Crocheron (1980) [1954]. Many a Good Crusade: Memoirs of Virginia Gildersleeve. New York: Arno Press. p. 317. ISBN 978-0405128417.
- Gildersleeve, Virginia Crocheron (1962). A Hoard for Winter. New York: Columbia University Press. ISBN 0-231-02595-5. (essays)
