= Henry Alger Gildersleeve =

American Jurist

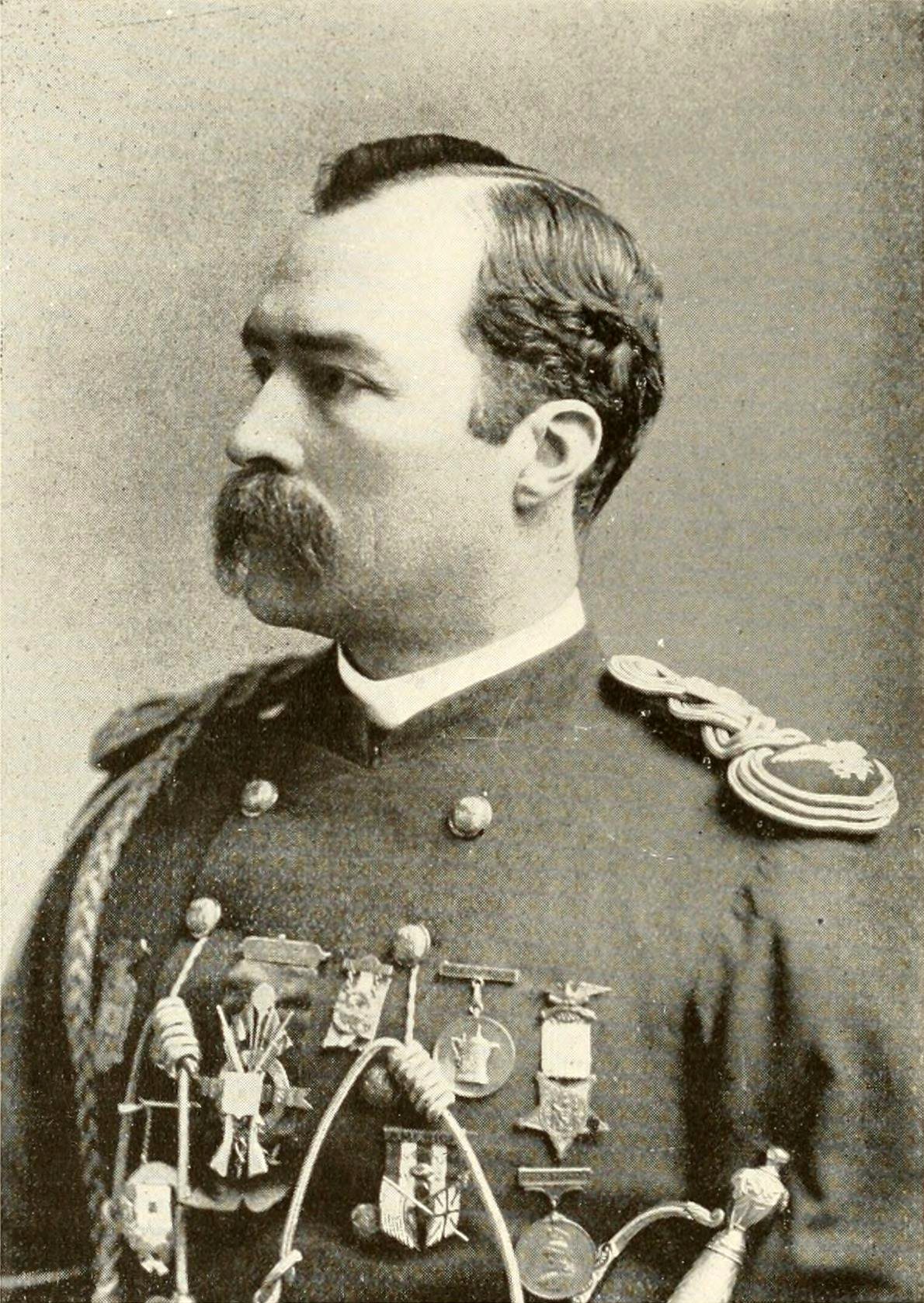
- Born: August 1, 1840; Clinton, New York
- Died: February 27, 1923 (aged 82); Manhattan, New York
- Education: Columbia University
- Occupation: Jurist
- Spouse: Virginia Crocheron (m. 1868)
- Children: 5 including Virginia Gildersleeve

Henry Alger Gildersleeve (1 August 1840 – 27 February 1923) was an American jurist and sports shooter who served on the New York Supreme Court.

Following a military career in the union army during the American Civil War, Henry A. Gildersleeve became a competitive marksman and early leader of the National Rifle Association of America. Gildersleeve was a prominent New York jurist, serving as judge on the New York General sessions bench from 1875 to 1889, and later as Supreme Court justice from 1891 to 1910.

== Early life ==
Henry A. Gildersleeve was born in Clinton, New York, on August 1, 1840, to Smith James Gildersleeve and Rachel Alger Gildersleeve. After attending school in Poughkeepsie, he briefly worked as a school teacher.

== Military and Shooting Career ==
When the American Civil war broke out, he recruited an infantry company from his hometown to form the 150th New York Infantry. Commissioned a Captain in 1862, his regiment fought in the Battle of Gettysburg in 1863, campaigns in Maryland and Virginia before participating in Sherman’s March to the Sea in 1864. His military accomplishments earned him praise from Abraham Lincoln, who brevetted Gildersleeve as Lieutenant Colonel near the end of the war.

In 1870, five years after the close of the Civil War, he joined the National Guard as lieutenant colonel of the 12th Regiment of the State of New York. During the Orange Riots of 1871, Gildersleeve and his regiment defended the New York Arsenal.

Gildersleeve co-founded the National Rifle Association of America (NRA) whose mission was to “encourage the rifle practice and to promote a system of aiming drill and target firing among the National Guard”. He later went on to become secretary and later president of the National Rifle Association for a single term in 1880-1881.

Gildersleeve was a member of the United States Rifle Team who won the 1874 International Rifle Contest at Creedmoor in a close match against the Irish team. The following year, Gildersleeve led the American team on a European tour, including a return match against Ireland in Dublin, which they won decisively. In 1878, Gildersleeve authored a book titled Rifles and Marksmanship.

On September 17, 1889, 25 years after the Battle of Gettysburg, Gildersleeve gave an oration at the battlefield and dedicated a monument to the 150th New York Regiment from Dutchess County.

== Legal career ==
After returning from the Civil war, Gildersleeve studied law at Columbia University under Theodore Willam Dwight. In 1866, he was admitted to the bar and began practicing law. Henry A. Gildersleeve was elected to the New York General Sessions Bench in 1875, supported by both the Democratic Tammany establishment and the Republican party. His tenure as judge was characterized by harsh sentences, in particular for crimes against property. A 1888 New York Times article accused him of discrimination, giving vastly different sentences in two apparently similar cases. In 1889, Gildersleeve failed to be re-elected as General Sessions Judge, losing to his opponent, James Fitzgerald.

In 1891, Gildersleeve was appointed to the state Superior Court, which in 1895 became the Supreme Court of New York. He was re-elected in 1905 for another fourteen-year term as Supreme Court justice, but resigned from the court in 1909 at the age of 69.

Following his resignation from the supreme court, Gildersleeve continued to practice law and served in 1912 as councel to Madeleine Force Astor, helping to settle the will of her deceased husband, John Jacob Astor IV who died in the sinking of the RMS Titanic.

== Death ==
Henry Alger Gildersleeve died at his Manhattan home on 27 February 1923 at the age of 82. His funeral was held at Columbia University Chapel.

== Marriage and Family ==
In 1868, Gildersleeve married Virginia Crocheron (1843-1923). They had five children, although two died in infancy. Their other children were:

- Alger Crocheron Gildersleeve (1869-1952), an engineer who served in WWI.
- Henry ‘Harry’ Alger Gildersleeve Jr. (1871-1891), who earned a master’s degree at Columbia University but died of complications of typhoid fever in 1891.
- Virginia Crocheron Gildersleeve (1877-1965), an academic and long-time dean of Barnard College, notable for being the only woman from the U.S delegation who wrote the United Nations Charter in 1945.
