= Arthur Sidgwick =

English teacher and classical scholar (1840–1920)

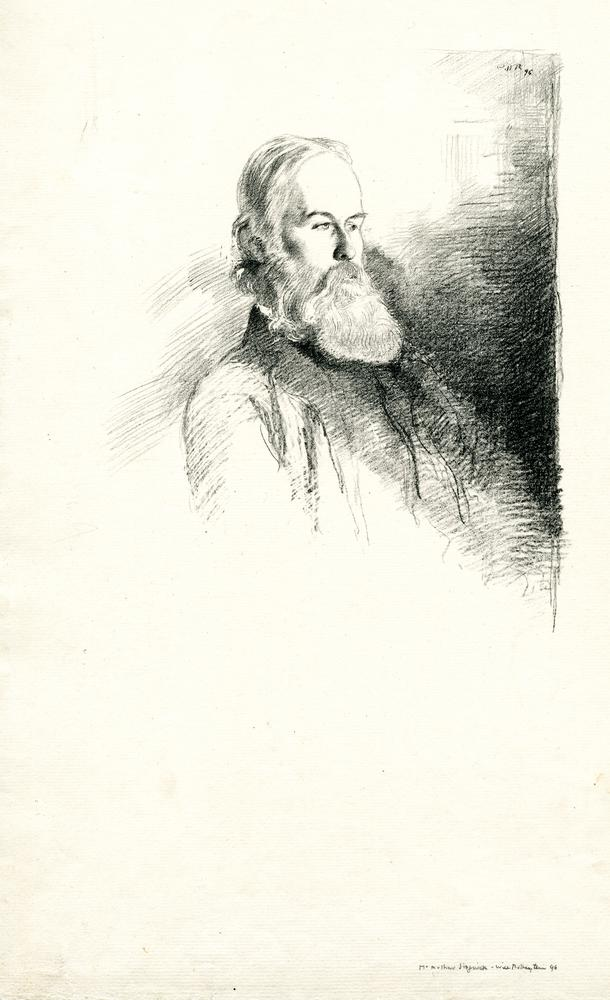
Arthur Sidgwick, 1896 lithograph

Arthur Sidgwick (1840–1920) was an English classical scholar who had an early career as a schoolteacher. Despite his self-deprecating remark "in erudition I am naught", he is considered a great teacher of ancient Greek poetry.

He also became an important figure in the advancement of female education at the University of Oxford.

== Early life ==
The fourth son and fifth child of the Rev. William Sidgwick (died 1841) and his wife Mary Crofts, he was born at Skipton, Yorkshire; Henry Sidgwick was his older brother. He was educated at Rugby School and Trinity College, Cambridge, matriculating in 1859, and graduating B.A. as second classic in 1863. He was President of the Cambridge Union in 1863. As was Henry, he was elected to the Cambridge Apostles. They tried, but failed, to have F. W. H. Myers elected also.

== Career ==
A Fellow of Trinity College from 1864 to 1879, Sidgwick was for that period an assistant master to Rugby School, invited to return by Frederick Temple, headmaster at the end of his time as a pupil there. He clashed with Henry Hayman, the headmaster of Rugby. With Henry Lee Warner (1842–1925) as an ally, Sidgwick organised a significant resistance to the incoming Hayman's authority. There followed a furore in 1873–4. It saw Hayman ousted after trying to sack Sidgwick and Charles James Eliseo Smith (1835–1900).

In 1879, Sidgwick became a Fellow of Corpus Christi College, Oxford. He stood out among the generally orthodox, conservative classics dons as a Liberal, as did the radical Thomas Collins Snow. He pioneered, with Arthur Herbert Dyke Acland, undergraduate study groups to raise awareness of current affairs.

Gilbert Murray arrived as an Oxford undergraduate in 1884, and Sidgwick became a father figure to him. In his autobiography, after noting the continuity with school, Murray wrote: "Sidgwick was a great exception. So was one of the St John's fellows, T. C. Snow". He enjoyed the chance to discuss liberal politics freely; and Stapleton writes that Murray's vision of "an alliance between classical scholarship and liberalism" was inspired by Sidgwick. It was at an 1887 picnic organised by the Sidgwicks that Murray met Rosalind Howard, Countess of Carlisle, his future mother-in-law.

Sidgwick was an educational reformer. He was secretary of Oxford's Association for the Education of Women from 1882 to 1907, then becoming its president. There he worked with Bertha Johnson and Annie Rogers. In 1893 he argued in favour of women being allowed to serve on educational governing bodies. A long-time suffragist, he was also influential in the 1920 decision by the University of Oxford to grant degrees to women.

An anti-imperialist, Sidgwick was president of the Oxford Liberal Association for 28 years. He belonged to the local group of Positivists, centred on Richard Congreve at Wadham College. He was also allied to the Manchester Guardian's supporters, typefied by his friend Leonard Hobhouse; and helped C. P. Scott recruit Hobhouse to the newspaper in 1897.

== Works ==
- Introduction to Greek Prose Composition (1876), a standard work that went through many editions.
- Form Discipline (1886)
- Henry Sidgwick, Miscellaneous Essays and Addresses (1904), editor with Eleanor Sidgwick
- Henry Sidgwick: A Memoir (1906), with Eleanor Sidgwick

=== Editions ===
- Homer's Iliad books i. ii. (1887)
- Aeschylus. Choephoroi (1884)

== Family ==
Sidgwick married in 1873, in the hiatus from teaching at Rugby School caused by his quarrel with Hayman, Charlotte Sophia Wilson, sister of James Maurice Wilson, a colleague on the teaching staff. Their five children included:

- Rose Sidgwick (1877–1918), an academic and history lecturer at the University of Birmingham until her early death in 1918.
- Ethel Sidgwick (1877–1970), born 11 months after Rose. Ethel became a novelist, poet, playwright, translator, biographer and peace activist.
- Frank Sidgwick (1879-1939), publisher and novelist, from 1902 partner to A. H. Bullen at the Shakespeare Head Press, then from 1907 co-founder of the publishing firm Sidgwick & Jackson, eventually sold to Pan Macmillan. He wrote two novels - Love and Battles (1909), and Treasure of Thule (1912). Frank Sidgwick's Diary was published in 1975.
- Arthur Hugh Sidgwick (1882-1917), scholar, educationist, poet and essayist. He was a civil servant at the Board of Education from 1906 to 1915. Then, as a Captain in the Royal Garrison Artillery, he died of wounds on the western front near Ypres on 17th September 1917. Writing as A.H Sidgwick his books include Walking Essays (1912), The Promenade Ticket (1914), and a collection of poems, Jones's Wedding, published posthumously in 1918.

== See also ==
- Henry Sidgwick
- Translation ("Back-translation" section): Mark Twain's account of "a synopsized adaptation of his story ['The Celebrated Jumping Frog of Calaveras County'] that Twain stated had appeared, unattributed to Twain, in a Professor Sidgwick's Greek Prose Composition (p. 116) under the title, 'The Athenian and the Frog'; the adaptation had for a time been taken for an independent ancient Greek precursor to Twain's 'Jumping Frog' story."
