= Cecily Sidgwick =

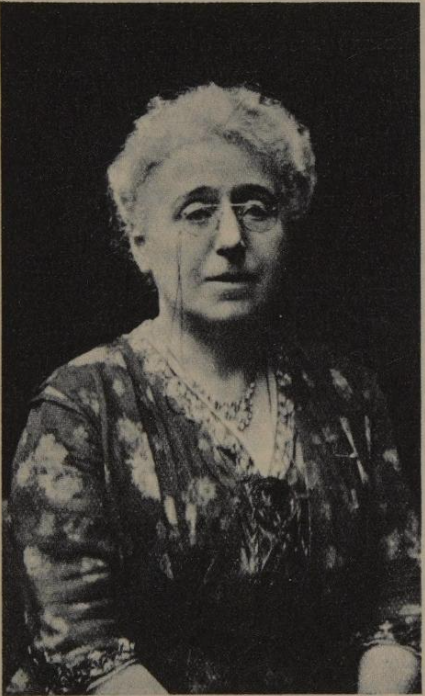
- Born: 1854; London
- Died: 10 August 1934 (aged 79–80); St Buryan
- Occupation: Writer
- Spouse(s): Alfred Sidgwick

Cecily Wilhelmine Ullmann Sidgwick (1854 – 10 August 1934) was a British novelist. She published 45 novels, mostly about the Jewish experience in England and Germany, under the names Mrs. Alfred Ullmann Sidgwick and Andrew Dean.

Cecily Wilhelmine Ullmann was born in 1854 in Islington, London to German-Jewish parents, David Ullmann and Wilhelmine Auguste Flaase Ullmann. In 1883, she married Alfred Sidgwick, logician and philosopher at Owens College in Manchester.

Most of her novels dealt with the marriages of middle-class Jewish families, and she touched on subjects including anti-Semitism, interfaith marriage, and suicide.

Cecily Sidgwick died on 10 August 1934 in St Buryan, Cornwall.

== Partial bibliography ==
- Caroline Schlegel. 1889.
- Isaac Eller's Money. 1 vol. London: T. Fisher Unwin, 1889.
- A Splendid Cousin. 1 vol. London: T. Fisher Unwin, 1892.
- Mrs. Finch-Brassey. 3 vol. London: Bentley, 1893.
- Lesser's Daughter. 1 vol. London: T. Fisher Unwin, 1894.
- The Grasshoppers. 1 vol. London: A. and C. Black, 1895.
- A Woman with a Future. 1 vol. London: A. and C. Black, 1896.
- Cousin Ivo. 1 vol. London: A. and C. Black, 1899.
- The Inner Shrine. 1 vol. London: Harper and Bros., 1900.
- Cynthia's Way. 1 vol. London: Edward Arnold, 1901.
- The Thousand Eugenias, and Other Stories. 1 vol. London: Edward Arnold, 1902.
- Scenes of Jewish Life. 1904.
- The Professor's Legacy. 1905.
- The Kinsman. 1907.
- Home Life in Germany. 1908.
- The Severins. 1909.
- (with Mrs. Paynter) The Children's Book of Gardening. 1909.
- The Lantern Bearers. 1910.
- Odd Come Shorts. 1911.
- Anthea's Guest. 1911.
- Lamorna. 1912.
- Below Stairs. 1913.
- In Other Days. 1915.
- Mr. Broom and His Brother. 1915.
- Salt and Savour. 1916.
- Anne Lulworth. 1917.
- Karen. 1918.
- (with Crosbie Garstin) The Black Knight. 1920.
- Law and Outlaw. 1921.
- Victorian. 1922.
- None-Go-By. 1923.
- London Mixture. 1924.
- Hummingbird. 1925.
- Sack and Sugar. 1926.
- The Bride's Prelude. 1927.
- Come-By-Chance. 1928.
- Six of Them. 1929.
- Masquerade. 1930.
- Storms and Teacups. 1931.
- Maid and Minx. 1932.
- Refugees. 1934.
