= Elizabeth Reynard =

English professor (1897–1962)

Elizabeth Reynard

Elizabeth Reynard (1897–1962) was an English professor at Barnard College. She served in the military, helping to establish the WAVES (Women Accepted for Volunteer Emergency Service) and was the first woman to be appointed lieutenant in the United States Navy Reserve.

== Early life ==
Born in Massachusetts, she moved with her mother following her father's death to New York City. The family was "virtually destitute" following his death.

She graduated from Barnard College in 1922, having worked as a copywriter during her time there. Her senior year, she won the $1,200 (equivalent to $23,082 in 2025) Helen Prince memorial prize for excellence in composition.

== Career ==
She taught part-time at Barnard following her graduation. By 1939, Reynard was the head of the new American Studies department. She retired in 1947.

She took a leave of absence when working as a professor at the college to help the Navy develop a program to incorporate women into the military, which resulted in the WAVES. (Note: While the development of the organization was in-progress, the press nicknamed the future service women sailorettes and gobettes. Reynard came up with the name Women Accepted for Volunteer Emergency Service, to indicate that the organization was temporary as a means to placate the men in command who were nervous about women joining the branch of service. The acronym called to mind the seas.) Reynard was second in command of the WAVES. It was led by Virginia Gildersleeve. She was transferred to New York to work at Hunter College, where she developed a training program to be used by the WAVES.

She was the first woman to be appointed lieutenant in the U.S. Navy Reserve.

She authored The Narrow Land (1934) and The Mutinous Wind (1951).

== Personal life ==
Reynard was the companion of Virginia Gildersleeve, who was the Dean of Barnard College, and the sole female US delegate to the April 1945 San Francisco United Nations Conference on International Organization. By 1947, they were living together in Bedford, New York and spending the summers in Cape Cod, Massachusetts.

Reynard died in 1962 and Gildersleeve died three years later, having moved to a nursing home in Cape Cod after Reynard's death. They are buried together at Saint Matthew's Episcopal Churchyard, Bedford, New York.

Documents by and about Reynard, including digital images of scrapbooks she maintained about the WAVES, are held at the Schlesinger Library at Harvard University.
