= Sedgwick (surname) =

Sedgwick is a surname. Notable people with the surname include:

== Academics ==
- Adam Sedgwick (1785–1873), British geologist
- Adam Sedgwick (1854–1913), British zoologist
- Eve Kosofsky Sedgwick (1950–2009), American queer theorist
- Mark Sedgwick (born 1960), British historian of Arab and Islamic Studies
- Leonard John Sedgwick (1883–1925), Indian botanist and civil servant
- Romney Sedgwick (1895–1972), British historian, civil servant and diplomat
- William Thompson Sedgwick (1855–1921), American biologist

== Performers ==
- Edie Sedgwick (1943–1971), American actress and model
- Edward Sedgwick (1892–1953), American movie director, writer, actor and producer
- Eileen Sedgwick (1898–1991), American actress, sister of Edward
- Kyra Sedgwick (born 1965), American actress
- Robert Sedgwick American actor
- Toby Sedgwick (born 1958), British theatre director, actor and choreographer
- David Sedgwick Australian actor

== Politicians ==
- Charles B. Sedgwick (1815–1883), US Representative from New York
- Henry J. Sedgwick (1812–1868), New York politician
- Theodore Sedgwick (1746–1813), Senator

== Sportspeople ==
- Alex Sedgwick (born 1999), British racing driver
- Bill Sedgwick (born 1955), American racing driver
- Cam Sedgwick (born 1978), lacrosse player
- Chris Sedgwick (born 1980), footballer
- Herbert Sedgwick (1883–1957), cricketer

== Theologians ==
- Obadiah Sedgwick (1599/1600–1658), Puritan divine
- Thomas Sedgwick (died 1573), Catholic theologian and martyr
- Timothy F. Sedgwick, academic and theologian
- William Sedgwick (bishop) (1858–1948), New Zealand bishop

== Writers ==
- Anne Douglas Sedgwick (1873–1935), writer
- Catharine Sedgwick (1789–1867), writer
- Ellery Sedgwick (1872–1960), editor
- Henry Dwight Sedgwick (1861–1957), lawyer and writer
- Marcus Sedgwick (born 1968), author and illustrator
- Peter Sedgwick (1934–1983), socialist activist and writer
- Theodore Sedgwick (writer) (1811–1859), writer

== Others ==
- John Sedgwick (1813–1864), American Civil War general
- Joseph Sedgwick (1898–1981), lawyer
- Robert Sedgwick (colonist) (1611–1656), Colonist
- Samuel H. Sedgwick (1848–1919), Justice of the Nebraska Supreme Court
- Steve Sedgwick (public servant), (born 1950) Australian senior public servant

== See also ==
- Sedgwick family, the American branch of the family started by Robert Sedgwick
