= Robert Sedgewick =

Robert Sedgewick or Sedgwick may refer to:

- Robert Sedgewick (computer scientist) (born 1946), American computer scientist and author
- Robert Sedgewick (judge) (1848–1906), justice of the Supreme Court of Canada
- Robert Sedgwick (colonist) (c. 1611–1656), American colonist
- Robert Sedgwick (actor), American actor
