= Rose Sidgwick =

University lecturer (1877–1918)

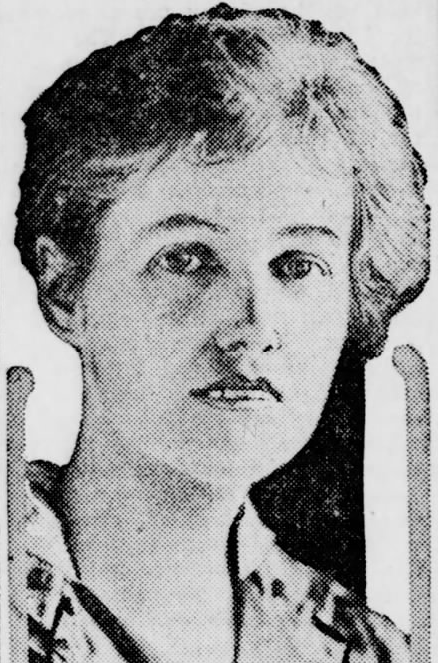
Rose Sidgwick, 1918

Rose Sidgwick (Rugby, 1877 – New York, 1918), was a British university teacher and one of the founders of the International Federation of University Women.

== Life and career ==
Sidgwick was born on 9 January 1877, the second daughter of Charlotte Sophia Wilson (1853–1924) and Arthur Sidgwick (1840–1920). Her younger sister, the writer Ethel Sidgwick, was born 11 months later. After the Oxford Girls High School, Sidgwick received an honours degree in modern history at Oxford. In 1902, she enrolled in the Diploma of Education and passed the examination – with Distinction – one year later. At Somerville College she worked as temporary tutor in history and after a few years, as librarian.

Sidgwick continued her career at the University of Birmingham, where she was appointed as assistant lecturer in History. In addition she was involved in training programs for social workers and supporting the Workers Educational Association.

During a trip to the USA in 1918, Sidgwick, as a member of a British delegation, met several representatives of American universities and discussed the opportunities for closer cooperation between universities from the UK and the US. During the same visit, she also discussed the founding of a world organisation for higher educated women, with among others Virginia Gildersleeve, Dean of Barnard College, resulting in the launch of International Federation of University Women.

She died from the effects of flu on 28 December 1918 in New York.
