= Cambridge (disambiguation) =

Cambridge is a city and the county town of Cambridgeshire, United Kingdom, notable for being the location of the University of Cambridge.

Cambridge may also refer to:

== Places ==
=== Australia ===
- Cambridge, Tasmania, a suburb of Hobart
- Town of Cambridge, a Western Australian local government area

=== Barbados ===
- Cambridge, Barbados, a populated place in the parish of Saint Joseph, Barbados

=== Canada ===
- Cambridge, Ontario, a city
- Cambridge (federal electoral district), a federal electoral district corresponding to Cambridge, Ontario
- Cambridge (provincial electoral district), a provincial electoral district corresponding to Cambridge, Ontario
- Cambridge, Hants County, Nova Scotia, a small community in Canada
- Cambridge, Kings County, Nova Scotia, a small community in Canada
- Cambridge Bay, Nunavut, a hamlet in Canada
- Cambridge Parish, New Brunswick, a civil parish in Canada
- Cambridge-Narrows, New Brunswick, a small community in Canada

=== Jamaica ===
- Cambridge, Jamaica

=== Malta ===
- Cambridge Battery/Fort Cambridge, an artillery battery

=== New Zealand ===
- Cambridge, New Zealand

=== South Africa ===
- Cambridge, Eastern Cape

=== United Kingdom ===
- Cambridge (Sefton ward), in Sefton, Merseyside
- Cambridge, Gloucestershire
- Cambridge, Scottish Borders, a location in the United Kingdom
- Cambridge, West Yorkshire, a location in the United Kingdom
- Cambridge (UK Parliament constituency)
- County of Cambridge, another name for Cambridgeshire
- Cambridge Heath, a place in the London borough of Tower Hamlets

=== United States ===
- Cambridge, Idaho, a city
- Cambridge, Illinois, a village
- Cambridge, Iowa, a city
- Cambridge, Kansas, a city
- Cambridge, Kentucky, a city
- Cambridge, Maine, a town
- Cambridge, Maryland, a city
- Cambridge, Massachusetts, a city where Harvard University and the Massachusetts Institute of Technology are located
- Cambridge, Minnesota, a city
- Cambridge, Missouri, a ghost town
- Cambridge, Nebraska, a city
- Cambridge, New Hampshire, a township
- Cambridge, Delran, New Jersey, an unincorporated community within Delran Township
- Cambridge (town), New York, a town
- Cambridge (village), New York, a village
- Cambridge, Ohio, a city
- Cambridge, Vermont, a town

- Cambridge (village), Vermont, a village within the town

- Cambridge, Wisconsin, a village
- Cambridge City, Indiana, a town
- Cambridge Springs, Pennsylvania, a borough
- Cambridge Township, Ohio, a township
- Cambridge Township, Henry County, Illinois, a township
- Cambridge Township, Michigan, a township
- Cambridge Township, Minnesota, a township
- Cambridge Township, Pennsylvania, a township

=== Extraterrestrial ===
- 2531 Cambridge, a stony Main Belt asteroid in the Solar System

== People ==
=== Given name ===
- Cambridge Jones, British celebrity photographer

=== Surnames ===
- Ada Cambridge (1844–1926), English-born Australian writer
- Alice Cambridge (1762–1829), early Irish Methodist preacher
- Alyson Cambridge (born 1980), American operatic soprano and classical music, jazz, and American popular song singer
- Asuka Cambridge (born 1993), Japanese sprint athlete
- Barrington Cambridge (born 1957), Guyanese boxer
- Desmond Cambridge (born 1979), American basketball player
- George Cambridge (priest), (1756–1841) English churchman
- Godfrey Cambridge (1933–1976), American stand-up comic and actor
- Jaloni Cambridge (born 2005), American basketball player
- Richard Owen Cambridge (1717–1802), British poet

=== Titles ===
- Duke of Cambridge

== Brands and enterprises ==
- Cambridge (cigarette)
- Cambridge Audio, a manufacturer of audio equipment
- Cambridge Glass, a glass company of Cambridge, Ohio
- Cambridge Scientific Instrument Company, founded 1881 in England
- Cambridge SoundWorks, a manufacturer of audio equipment
- Cambridge Theatre, a theatre in the West End of London
- Cambridge University Press

== Educational institutions ==
- Cambridge State University, US
- The Cambridge School (disambiguation)
- University of Cambridge, UK

== Other uses ==
- Cambridge (book), 2005 book by Tim Rawle
- Cambridge (ship), four merchant ships
- Austin Cambridge, motor car range produced by the Austin Motor Company
- Cambridge Cottage, a building in London, England
- Cambridge Circus (disambiguation)

== See also ==
- Cambridge Park (disambiguation)
- Cambridge Town (disambiguation)
- Duchess of Cambridge (disambiguation)
