= Cambridge School =

Cambridge School may refer to:

== Educational Institutions ==
=== Canada ===
- Cambridge Public School (Embrun, Ontario), Ontario, Canada

=== India ===
- Cambridge School (Neermarga), Mangalore
- Cambridge School Srinivaspuri, South Delhi
- Colonel Brown Cambridge School, Dehradun
- Cambridge School Noida, U.P.
- Cambridge School (Greater Noida), Uttar Pradesh
- Cambridge School Indirapuram, Uttar Pradesh
- Cambridge School New Friends Colony, Delhi

=== United Kingdom ===
- Cambridge Judge Business School, Cambridge
- Cambridge Steiner School, Cambridge
- Cambridge School of Art, former name of Anglia Ruskin University

=== United States ===
- The Cambridge School of Weston in Massachusetts
- Cambridge School of Architecture and Landscape Architecture
- Cambridge School of Culinary Arts, Cambridge, Massachusetts
- Cambridge Street School in Worcester, Massachusetts
- Cambridge School of Business, former name of Grahm Junior College, Boston, Massachusetts
- Cambridge Rindge and Latin School in Cambridge, Massachusetts
- Cambridge Public School and High School, Wisconsin, United States

=== Other educational institutions ===
- The Cambridge School, Doha, Qatar
- St Mary's Cambridge School, Rawalpindi, Pakistan

== Intellectual traditions ==
- Cambridge School (intellectual history), a style of historical methodology
- Cambridge School of historiography

== See also ==
- Cambridge (disambiguation)
- Cambridge Christian School (disambiguation)
- Cambridge Elementary School (disambiguation)
- Cambridge High School (disambiguation)
- Cambridge International School (disambiguation)
- Cambridge Public School (disambiguation)
- University of Cambridge
