= Cambridge Elementary School =

Cambridge Elementary/Primary School may refer to:

== Australia ==
- Cambridge Primary School, Hoppers Crossing, Victoria
- Cambridge Primary School, Cambridge, Tasmania

== Canada ==
- Cambridge Elementary School (Surrey, British Columbia)
- Cambridge Public School, Ottawa, Ontario
- Cambridge Public School, Embrun, Ontario

== United Kingdom ==
- University of Cambridge Primary School
- Cambridge Primary School, a school in Barrow-in-Furness

== United States ==
- Cambridge Elementary School, in the Mount Diablo Unified School District, Contra Costa County, California
- Cambridge Elementary School, Vacaville, California
- Cambridge Elementary School, Cocoa, Florida
- Cambridge Elementary School, Kendall Park, New Jersey
- Cambridge Elementary School, Jeffersonville, Vermont
- Cambridge Public School and High School, Cambridge, Wisconsin

== See also ==
- Cambridge Public School District
- Cambridge School (disambiguation)
- Cambridge High School (disambiguation)
