= Lewis Benson =

Lewis Benson may refer to:

- Lewis Benson (historian)
- Lewis Benson (boxer)
- Lewis Benson (politician)
