= Cambridge International School =

Cambridge International School may refer to:

- Cambridge International School, Cambridge, a school in Cambridge, England
- Cambridge International School (Moscow), Russia
- Cambridge International School, Doha, a school in Qatar
- Cambridge International School, Dubai, a school in the United Arab Emirates

== See also ==
- Cambridge Assessment International Education, a provider of international school examinations and qualifications
- The Cambridge School (disambiguation)
