= Valens Comyn =

English politician

Valens Comyn (1688 – 25 March 1751) was an English merchant and administrator and politician who sat in the House of Commons from 1747 to 1751.

Comyn was the fifth son of Rev. Robert Comyn and his wife Martha, and was baptised on 4 June 1688 at East Molesey, Surrey where his father was vicar and also headmaster of nearby Kingston Grammar School. His elder brother Robert, later Archdeacon of Shropshire, was a friend of the influential Robert Harley and in January 1712 Comyn was appointed to a position in the Excise Office. Comyn's title by 1716 was Assistant Accomptant for duties on Hides. In 1718 he was appointed to the position of Clerk to the Worshipful Company of Parish Clerks, a minor livery company of which his father in law James Lucas was a member. Through this, Comyn was required to live at the Hall of the Company in Wood Street.

In 1726, Comyn was selected as accountant for the Corporation of the Sons of the Clergy. The post had been in abeyance, but 1726 the council decided to appoint an accountant at a salary of £40 per year. An election was held with Comyn in nomination with two others. He obtained 20 votes and was elected. In the following year the council decided to award him a gratuity for his very extraordinary services. These services were the uncovering of the fraudulent activities of one of the Treasurers who had been double listing widows whose pensions he was responsible for paying, and lining his pockets on the proceeds By 1727 Comyn was also Accountant for the County inland excise on beer, ale etc. at the Excise Office and in the same year he was one of the appraisers of the inventory of Sir Isaac Newton including the contents of his house at 35 St. Martin's Street.

In 1731 Comyn was appointed Registrar of the Corporation as well as Accountant. This gave him accommodation in the house belonging to the Corporation in Salisbury Court off Fleet Street, and he obtained dispensation from the Company of Parish Clerks to move from their Hall. In 1734 Comyn succeeded his father in law James Lucas as Clerk to the Chamberlain of St Paul's Cathedral. This post was responsible for administering many of the Cathedral estates and charities. Comyn resigned from the Corporation, recommending his nephew Stephen to succeed him. He moved into the Chapter House of St Paul's Cathedral, leaving his nephew to live at the house in Salisbury Court. Comyn was also appointed Accomtant General of Excise from 1734 to 1745. During this time, Comyn took up residences upstream on the River Thames, at Hammersmith and later at Twickenham. In 1745 Comyn was a member of a group who subsidised a fleet of the privateers and over the next two years amassed a large fortune privateering. Comyn was credited with developing life assurance tables based on life expectancy.

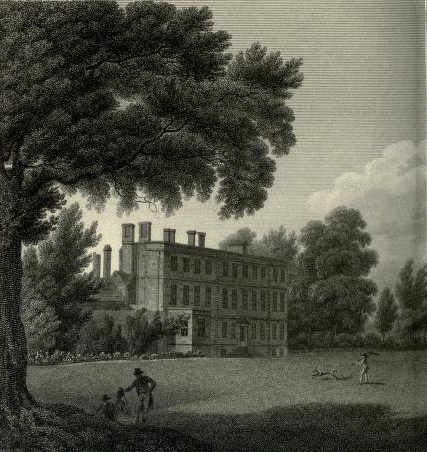
Twickenham Meadows, engraving by John Landseer after John Webber (detail)

In the 1747 British general election, Comyn was elected Member of Parliament for Hindon a rotten borough in Hampshire as a government supporter in the interest of Sir Henry Calthorpe. In 1749 Comyn was living at Eversley, Hampshire as well as an estate at Twickenham Meadows. He died at Eversley aged 63 and was buried at Twickenham. He died intestate, and as the proceeds of various privateering expeditions had not been fully distributed, his estate was subject to considerable litigation, with over 100 cases under his name.

Comyn married Mary Lucas ( -1730) at St Mary le Bow on 31 January 1713. They had a large family and she died in 1730. On 29 December 1748 Comyn married Mary Colston ( -1780) of St Andrews Holborn at the Lincolns Inn Chapel. Mary was the widow of Francis Colston and daughter of Richard Nicholson. After his death, his widow lived at 13 Bedford Row from 1756 to 1780 in which year she died. Comyn was great-uncle of Stephen George Comyn who was naval chaplain to Lord Nelson.
