= Cambridge Village =

Cambridge Village can refer to several places in the U.S.:

- Newton, Massachusetts, a city formerly known as "Cambridge Village"
- Cambridge (village), New York, a village
- Cambridge (village), Vermont, a village
- Cambridge Village, a subdivision in Hiram Clarke, Houston, Texas

== See also ==
- Cambridge (disambiguation)
