= George Cambridge =

George Cambridge can refer to:

- Prince George of Wales, previously sometimes known by this name
- Prince George, Duke of Cambridge
- George Cambridge, 2nd Marquess of Cambridge
- George Cambridge (priest), archdeacon of Middlesex
