= Cambridge micropolitan area =

The Cambridge micropolitan area may refer to:

- The Cambridge, Maryland micropolitan area, United States
- The Cambridge, Ohio micropolitan area, United States

== See also ==
- Cambridge (disambiguation)
