= Cambridge (ship) =

Several ships have borne the name Cambridge for Cambridge:

- Cambridge (1797 ship) was launched at Whitby. She traded with New York, and then with Jamaica. In 1805 a French privateer captured her, but the British Royal Navy recaptured her shortly thereafter and she returned to her trade as a West Indiaman. In 1810 she sustained damage while sailing from Jamaica to Liverpool and was condemned at Havana.
- Porcher (1799 ship) was launched in 1799 at Calcutta. She made one voyage for the British East India Company (EIC) from Bengal to England. A French privateer captured her in 1802 but the British recaptured her in 1804. Thereafter she traded between England and India as a licensed ship. In 1809 she sailed to England where in 1810 new owners renamed her Cambridge. As Cambridge she made three voyages for the EIC as an extra ship. In 1818 she was again sold with her new owners continuing to sail her to the Far East as a licensed ship. She then made two more voyages to India for the EIC. In 1840 she was sold to an American trading house at Canton, and then to the Qing Dynasty, which purchased her for the Imperial Chinese Navy. The British Royal Navy destroyed her on 27 February 1841 during the Battle of First Bar at the onset of the First Opium War.
- Cambridge (1803 ship) was launched at Howdon (Newcastle upon Tyne). She made one or two voyages as whaler and then became a West Indiaman and later traded across the Atlantic and with the Baltic. In 1814 she repelled an attack by a privateer in a single-ship action. She was sunk in May 1841 while returning to Newcastle upon Tyne from Russia.
- Cambridge (1825 ship) was launched at Prince Edward Island. In 1826 she transferred her registry to Bristol, Gloucestershire. In 1827 she transported convicts to New South Wales. She foundered in 1835.
- Three steamships (1886, 1916, 1919) were named SS Cambridge.

== See also ==
- HMS Cambridge - one of four ships or a shore establishment of the British Royal Navy
