= Cambridge Township =

Cambridge Township may refer to the following places:

In Canada:

- Cambridge Township, Ontario

In the United States:

- Cambridge Township, Henry County, Illinois
- Cambridge Township, Michigan
- Cambridge Township, Isanti County, Minnesota
- Cambridge Township, Saline County, Missouri
- Cambridge, New Hampshire, a township
- Cambridge Township, Ohio
- Cambridge Township, Crawford County, Pennsylvania
