= City of Cambridge =

Cambridge can refer to four cities:

- Cambridge, Cambridgeshire, England
- Cambridge, Ontario, Canada
- Cambridge, Maryland, United States
- Cambridge, Massachusetts, United States

City of Cambridge can refer to:

- City of Cambridge Rowing Club, a rowing club based in Cambridge, England

== See also ==
- Town of Cambridge
- Cambridge (disambiguation)
