= List of shipwrecks in April 1835 =

The list of shipwrecks in April 1835 includes ships sunk, foundered, wrecked, grounded or otherwise lost during February 1835.

== 1 April ==
List of shipwrecks: 1 April 1835
Ship	State	Description
Victoria	United Kingdom	The ship ran aground of Partridge Island, New Brunswick, British North America and was severely damaged. She was on a voyage from Saint John, New Brunswick to Liverpool, Lancashire.

== 3 April ==
List of shipwrecks: 3 April 1835
Ship	State	Description
Felix	Prussia	The ship was driven ashore at Stavanger, Norway. She was on a voyage from Königsberg to Bergen, Norway.
Heinrich	Lübeck	The ship struck ice and was consequently beached at "Surophead" She was on a voyage from Lübeck to Reval, Russia.

== 4 April ==
List of shipwrecks: 4 April 1835
Ship	State	Description
Alert	United Kingdom	The ship ran aground on the Herd Sand, in the North Sea off County Durham. She was on a voyage from Newport, Monmouthshire to South Shields, County Durham. Alert was refloated on 9 April and taken in to South Shields, where she was beached after her cargo had been discharged.

== 5 April ==
List of shipwrecks: 5 April 1835
Ship	State	Description
Shamrock	United Kingdom	The ship ran aground at Maughold Head, Isle of Man. She was on a voyage from Liverpool, Lancashire to Westport, County Mayo.

== 6 April ==
List of shipwrecks: 6 April 1835
Ship	State	Description
Benjamin	United Kingdom	The ship was driven ashore at Liverpool, Lancashire. She was on a voyage from Liverpool to Odesa.
Mariner	United Kingdom	The ship was driven ashore at Savannah, Georgia, United States.

== 7 April ==
List of shipwrecks: 7 April 1835
Ship	State	Description
Madeline	United Kingdom	The ship was wrecked on a shoal east of Boa Vista, Cape Verde Islands. Her crew were rescued. She was on a voyage from London to Sydney, New South Wales.

== 8 April ==
List of shipwrecks: 8 April 1835
Ship	State	Description
Oceanus	Netherlands	The ship was driven ashore on Skagen, Denmark. She was on a voyage from Amsterdam, North Holland to Gothenburg, Sweden.

== 11 April ==
List of shipwrecks: 11 April 1835
Ship	State	Description
Samuel and Mary	United Kingdom	The ship struck the Crow Rock and foundered in the Bristol Channel near Milford Haven, Pembrokeshire. Her crew were rescued.

== 13 April ==
List of shipwrecks: 13 April 1835
Ship	State	Description
George III	United Kingdom	The convict ship was wrecked in the River Derwent, Van Diemen's Land with the loss of 134 of the 294 people on board. She was on a voyage from Woolwich, Kent to Van Diemen's Land.
Martha	United Kingdom	The ship capsized at Swansea, Glamorgan and was severely damaged.

== 14 April ==
List of shipwrecks: 14 April 1835
Ship	State	Description
Active	United Kingdom	The ship struck a rock and sank at Crail, Fife.
Unity	United Kingdom	The ship was wrecked in the River Moy at Ballina, County Mayo. She was on a voyage from Ballina to London.

== 15 April ==
List of shipwrecks: 15 April 1835
Ship	State	Description
Erin	United Kingdom	The ship struck the Crow Rock, in the Irish Sea and foundered. Her crew were rescued. She was on a voyage from Newry, County Antrim to Bristol, Gloucestershire.
Marie Cecile	France	The ship foundered. She was on a voyage from La Roquette-sur-Var, Alpes-Maritimes to Havre de Grâce, Seine-Inférieure.

== 16 April ==
List of shipwrecks: 16 April 1835
Ship	State	Description
Brothers	United Kingdom	The ship ran aground at Wicklow and was severely damaged. She was on a voyage from Wicklow to Swansea, Glamorgan.
General Sharp	United Kingdom	The sloop capsized and sank in a squall off Maryport, Cumberland with the loss of all hands. She was on a voyage from Maryport to Dumfries.

== 17 April ==
List of shipwrecks: 17 April 1835
Ship	State	Description
Sirene	Norway	The ship foundered off Sogndahl. Her crew were rescued.

== 18 April ==
List of shipwrecks: 18 April 1835
Ship	State	Description
Levant	United Kingdom	The ship was wrecked near Tétouan, Morocco. Her crew were rescued. She was on a voyage from Marseille, Bouches-du-Rhône, France to Liverpool, Lancashire.
Sarah Margaret	United Kingdom	The schooner struck rocks off Inisheer, County Galway and was wrecked. She was on a voyage from Galway to New York, United States.

== 20 April ==
List of shipwrecks: 20 April 1835
Ship	State	Description
Josephine	United Kingdom	The ship was driven ashore at Gravesend, Kent. She was on a voyage from London to Antwerp, Belgium.

== 21 April ==
List of shipwrecks: 21 April 1835
Ship	State	Description
Ligiera	Portugal	The ship foundered in the Atlantic Ocean (8°N 33°W). Her crew were rescued.
Thomas	United Kingdom	The flat sank off Rhyl, Caernarvonshire. Her three crew were rescued by the Point of Ayr Lifeboat.

== 22 April ==
List of shipwrecks: 22 April 1835
Ship	State	Description
Cambridge	United Kingdom	The ship departed from Bristol, Gloucestershire for Quebec City, Lower Canada, British North America. No further trace, presumed foundered with the loss of all hands.

== 23 April ==
List of shipwrecks: 23 April 1835
Ship	State	Description
Speedwell	United Kingdom	The ship was abandoned in ice off Anticosti Island, Nova Scotia, British North America. She was on a voyage from Montreal, Lower Canada, British North America to Hull, yorkshire.

== 24 April ==
List of shipwrecks: 24 April 1835
Ship	State	Description
Amelia	United Kingdom	The ship sank in the River Mersey with the loss of a crew member. She was on a voyage from the Isle of Man to Liverpool, Lancashire.

== 25 April ==
List of shipwrecks: 25 April 1835
Ship	State	Description
Elizabeth	United Kingdom	The ship was wrecked in Liverpool Bay with the loss of all hands. She was on a voyage from Caernarfon to Runcorn, Cheshire.
Green Isle	United Kingdom	The paddle steamer was in collision with Manchester (United Kingdom) and was beached at "Red Noses", Liverpool. Green Isle was on a voyage from Drogheda, County Louth to Liverpool, Lancashire. She was subsequently repaired and returned to service.
James Morgan	United Kingdom	The ship was in collision with Montcalm (United Kingdom) in the Atlantic Ocean (39°N 47°W) and foundered with the loss of eight of her nine crew. The survivor was rescued by Montcalm. James Morgan was on a voyage from Jamaica to Cork.

== 26 April ==
List of shipwrecks: 26 April 1835
Ship	State	Description
Clutha	United Kingdom	The ship was driven ashore at Ballywalter, County Down. Her crew were rescued. Shje was on a voyage from Glasgow, Renfrewshire to Montreal, Lower Canada, British North America.
Constant Trader	United Kingdom	The schooner was driven ashore and wrecked at Thurso, Caithness. Her crew were rescued. She was on a voyage from Berwick upon Tweed, Northumberland to Liverpool, Lancashire.
Hero	United Kingdom	The smack was driven ashore and wrecked at Thurso. Her crew were rescued. she was on a voyage from Newcastle upon Tyne, Northumberland to Dublin.
Phœnix	United Kingdom	The sloop was driven ashore and wrecked at Thurso. Her crew were rescued. She was on a voyage from Brora, Sutherland to Liverpool.

== 27 April ==
List of shipwrecks: 27 April 1835
Ship	State	Description
Fame	United Kingdom	The ship departed from Calcutta, India for Mauritius. Presumed lost in the Indian Ocean with the loss of all hands as she had not arrived by 28 August.

== 28 April ==
List of shipwrecks: 28 April 1835
Ship	State	Description
Familien	(Denmark) Duchy of Schleswig	The ship sprang a leak and was beached on Heligoland. She was on a voyage from Tönning to Hull, Yorkshire, United Kingdom.
King George IV	United Kingdom	The ship was wrecked at Douglas, Isle of Man.

== 29 April ==
List of shipwrecks: 29 April 1835
Ship	State	Description
Anna Margaretta	Hamburg	The ship was driven ashore and wrecked at Cuxhaven, Kingdom of Hanover. Her crew were rescued. She was on a voyage from Hamburg to Amsterdam, South Holland, Netherlands.
Ardent	Denmark	The ship was run down and sunk near Gibraltar by Nautilus (United Kingdom). Ardent was on a voyage from Copenhagen to Tarragona, Spain.
Hero	United Kingdom	The steamship foundered in Liverpool Bay. All on board were rescued by the steamship Druid (United Kingdom).
James	United Kingdom	The ship was driven ashore in the Humber at Winteringham, Lincolnshire. She capsized and was swept downstream and sank. Her crew survived.
Mary	United Kingdom	The ship foundered in the Irish Sea 10 nautical miles (19 km) south of Caldey Island, Glamorgan. Her crew were rescued by Star (United Kingdom). Mary was on a voyage from Gloucester to Dublin.

== 30 April ==
List of shipwrecks: 30 April 1835
Ship	State	Description
Blackbird	United Kingdom	The ship was driven ashore and wrecked at Winterton-on-Sea, Norfolk with the loss of four of her crew.
Frederick Auguste	Prussia	The ship was wrecked on the Whittaker Spit, in the North Sea off the coast of Essex, United Kingdom. Her captain drowned. She was on a voyage from London, United Kingdom to Memel.
Gambia	United Kingdom	The ship was driven ashore and wrecked at Sandsend, Yorkshire. She was on a voyage from Sandwich, Kent to Blyth, Northumberland.

== Unknown date ==
List of shipwrecks: Unknown date 1835
Ship	State	Description
Ann	United Kingdom	The ship was driven ashore at Licata, Sicily. She was on a voyage from Messina, Sicily to Leith, Lothian. Ann was refloated by 18 April, repaired and returned to service.
Boston	United States	The ship was wrecked between Locronan and Guissény, Finistère, France. She was reported to have been on a voyage from London, United Kingdom to Antwerp, Belgium.
Countess of Pembroke	United Kingdom	The steamship was in collision with the steamship Mermaid (United Kingdom) in the River Avon and was beached.
Fairy	(United Kingdom of Great Britain and Ireland) New South Wales	The cutter foundered off Cape Hawke before 30 April.
Marys	United Kingdom	The ship was in collision with Scotia (United Kingdom off Elsinore, Norway and was beached. She was later refloated and taken in to Elsinore.
Nile	United Kingdom	The ship foundered in the North Sea off Heligoland before 15 April.
Pilate	Austrian Empire	The brig was abandoned whilst on a voyage from Alexandria, Egypt Eyalet to Candia, Crete. Plague had broken out on board, killing most of the crew.
