= Cambridge High School =

Cambridge High School may refer to:

== In the United States ==
- Cambridge High School (Georgia) in Milton, Georgia
- Cambridge High School (Idaho) in Cambridge, Idaho
- Cambridge High School (Illinois) in Cambridge, Illinois
- Cambridge-South Dorchester High School in Maryland
- Cambridge Rindge and Latin School in Cambridge, Massachusetts
- Cambridge High School (Michigan) in Garden City, Michigan
- Cambridge-Isanti High School in Cambridge, Minnesota
- Cambridge High School (Nebraska) in Cambridge, Nebraska
- Cambridge High School (Cambridge, Ohio) in Cambridge, Ohio
- Cambridge High School (Wisconsin) in Cambridge, Wisconsin

== Elsewhere ==
- Cambridge High School, Jamaica in Jamaica
- Cambridge High School (Jordan) in Amman, Jordan
- Cambridge High School, New Zealand in Cambridge, New Zealand
- Cambridge High School, East London, South Africa
- Cambridge High School, (Abu Dhabi) in Abu Dhabi, UAE

== See also ==
- The Cambridge School (disambiguation)
