= Cambridge Township, Saline County, Missouri =

Inactive township in the US state of Missouri

Coordinates: 39.2642°N 93.0192°W

Cambridge Township is an inactive township in Saline County, in the U.S. state of Missouri.

Cambridge Township was erected in 1871, taking its name from the community of Cambridge, Missouri.
