= J. B. Jenson =

American politician (1864–?)

J. B. Jenson was an American politician. He was a member of the Wisconsin State Assembly.

== Biography ==
J. B. Jenson was born on December 3, 1864 in Brown County, Wisconsin. He and his parents later moved to Oakland, Jefferson County, Wisconsin before settling in Westford, Richland County, Wisconsin.

Jenson was elected to the Assembly in 1912 and again in 1914 as a Republican. He was also Chairman of Westford and a member of its board of education.
