= Cambridge Town =

Cambridge Town may refer to:

- Cambridge Town, Essex, a part of the town of Shoeburyness, England
- Town of Cambridge, Western Australia, Australia
- Camberley, town in Surrey originally named Cambridge Town
- Cambridge City F.C., football club in Cambridge known as Cambridge Town F.C. before 1951

== See also ==
- Cambridge (disambiguation)
