= Cambridge Park =

Cambridge Park may refer to:

== Australia ==
- Cambridge Park, New South Wales, a suburb of Sydney
  - Cambridge Park High School, Sydney
  - Cambridge Park RLFC, a rugby league club

== United Kingdom and Channel Islands ==
- Cambridge Science Park, science park at Trinity College, Cambridge
- Cambridge Business Park, Cambridge
- Cambridge Park, Twickenham, a residential neighbourhood of St Margarets, Twickenham, London
- Cambridge Park (Saint Peter Port), a park in Saint Peter Port, Guernsey

== United States ==
- Cambridge Junction Historic State Park, a state park in Cambridge Township, Michigan
- Cambridge Park, an unincorporated community in Evesham Township, New Jersey
