= Cambridge Christian School =

Cambridge Christian School may refer to:

- Cambridge Christian School (Florida), a K-12 private school
- Cambridge Christian School (Minnesota), a K-12 private school

== See also ==
- The Cambridge School (disambiguation)
