= Duchess of Cambridge (disambiguation) =

Duchess of Cambridge is a British noble title.

Duchess of Cambridge may also refer to:

- Caroline, Duchess of Cambridge (1683–1737), wife of George II, King of Great Britain (previously Duke of Cambridge)
- Princess Augusta, Duchess of Cambridge (1797–1889), wife of Prince Adolphus, Duke of Cambridge
- Catherine, Duchess of Cambridge (born 1982), wife of Prince William, Duke of Cambridge
- Duchess of Cambridge Stakes, a British horse race

== See also ==
- Cambridge (disambiguation)
- Kate Middleton (disambiguation)
- Sarah Fairbrother (1814–1890), unlawful wife of Prince George, Duke of Cambridge
- William, Prince of Wales (born 1982), Duke of Cambridge since 2011
