= HMT Cambridgeshire =

History

United Kingdom
- Name: Cambridgeshire GY180
- Owner: Cambridge Fishing Co Ltd, Grimsby
- Port of registry: Grimsby, Lincolnshire
- Builder: Smiths Dock Company, South Bank-on-Tees
- Yard number: 987
- Launched: 2 July 1935
- Commissioned: August 1939 as an Armed Trawler
- Fate: Broken-up, October 1954

General characteristics
- Type: Trawler
- Tonnage: 443 tons
- Length: 162.3ft
- Beam: 26.7ft

HMT Cambridgeshire (FY142) was a British Second World War anti-submarine trawler of the British Royal Navy, named after Cambridgeshire, an English county.

The 443 ton trawler was laid down on 2 July 1935 at Smiths Dock Company of South Bank-on-Tees and completed by the end of the year. The Royal Navy requisitioned her in August 1939 shortly before the outbreak of the war and converted her to an anti-submarine vessel, armed with a single 4 inch gun, machine guns, and depth charges.

On 17 June 1940, Cambridgeshire took part in the rescue of passengers and crew from the bombing of RMS Lancastria in the estuary of the River Loire during Operation Aerial. The ship's boat picked up many survivors from the water while German aircraft bombed and machine gunned them. Cambridgeshire's Lewis gunners claimed to have shot down one of the attacking planes. Cambridgeshire rescued an estimated 800 people; one of them was Lord Inverclyde. Three members of Cambridgeshire's crew received decorations for their conduct.

Later that night, Cambridgeshire received orders to evacuate the commander of the British Expeditionary Force, Lieutenant-General Alan Brooke, and his staff to England because the destroyer allocated was no longer available. There were no rafts or life jackets onboard following the rescue work and the decks were covered in bunker oil and discarded clothing. General Brooke had to clean the oil from his cabin. She left St Nazaire at 3am on 18 June and arrived in Plymouth late in the afternoon of the following day, having acted as an escort to a convoy of evacuation ships en route.

In June 1944, Cambridgeshire took part in Operation Neptune, the naval element of the Normandy Landings. The Navy sold her in 1945. She returned to commercial fishing, and was renamed Kingston Sapphire in 1947. The trawler was scrapped at Bruges, Belgium in October 1954.

== See also ==
- HMS Cambridge for other ships of a similar name
- Royal Naval Patrol Service
