= John W. Porter =

American politician

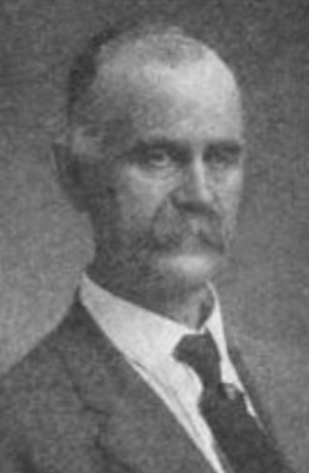

Member of the Wisconsin State Assembly
- In office 1919

Personal details
- Born: May 6, 1860 Oakland, Wisconsin, US
- Died: January 7, 1941 (aged 80) Cambridge, Wisconsin, US
- Party: Republican

John Wesley Porter (May 6, 1860 – January 7, 1941) was an American politician. He was a member of the Wisconsin State Assembly.

== Biography ==
Porter was born on May 6, 1860, in Oakland, Jefferson County, Wisconsin. In 1903, he purchased a home near Cambridge, Wisconsin. He died at his home in Cambridge in 1941.

== Career ==
Porter was elected to the Assembly in 1918. Additionally, he was chairman (similar to mayor) and a member of the school board of Oakland. He was a Republican.
