= Twickenham Meadows =

Estate in Twickenham, London, England

Coordinates: 51.45551°N 0.30762°W

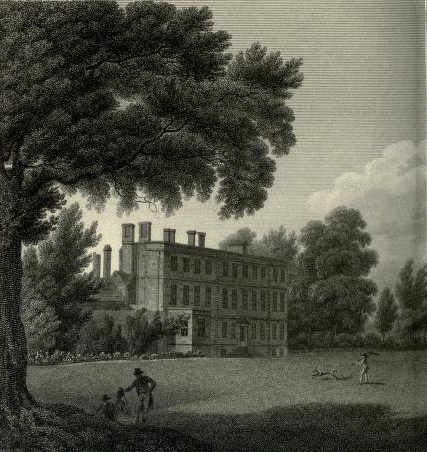
Twickenham Meadows, engraving by John Landseer after John Webber (detail)

Twickenham Meadows, later known as Cambridge Park, was a 74-acre estate, the second largest estate in Twickenham, England, after Twickenham Park. It has now been built over and the name remains for a part of Twickenham in optional – station-centric terms – considered St Margarets. The estate included a three-storey brick Jacobean mansion which was built around 1610 and was later known as Cambridge House. The house was demolished in 1937

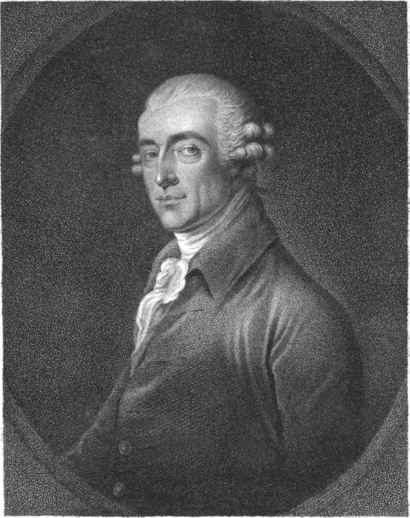
Richard Owen Cambridge

== Main estate ==
Sir Humphrey Lynde (1579–1636) an English lay Puritan controversialist and MP for Brecon acquired the estate in about 1616 and was responsible for the Jacobean house. Some frescoes and a fireplace surround dating from the middle of the 16th century were discovered when the house was demolished which suggests there may have been an earlier building. In 1630 the house came into the occupation of Joyce Carew, Countess of Totnes (1562–1637), widow of George Carew, 1st Earl of Totnes, who died 1629. She died in 1637, and the house was purchased by Sir Thomas Lawley, 1st Baronet (1586–1646) in 1638. After his death in 1646, the estate remained by the family until it was sold in 1657 to Sir Joseph Ashe, 1st Baronet (1617–1686). He was succeeded in 1687 by his son Sir James Ashe, 2nd Baronet (1674–1733). The baronet died in 1733, leaving an only daughter Martha, who had married Joseph Windham (1683–1746), who adopted the name Windham Ashe to succeed to the property. He enlarged the house and built the west front. After his death in 1747 Martha stayed at the house for two years until her death in 1749, when it was bought by Valens Comyn MP for Hindon. He died two years later and the estate was acquired by Richard Owen Cambridge (1717–1802), a celebrated poet. After he died in 1802 the house was occupied by his daughter Charlotte, and then in 1823 by his son George Owen Cambridge (1756–1841), who was an archdeacon.

George Cambridge divided the estate between what was to become Cambridge Park, and Meadowbank, where he built a new house. Cambridge Park was leased to Richard Edgcumbe, 2nd Earl of Mount Edgcumbe, who occupied the house until 1832 when John Cam Hobhouse took the lease. The estate, now consisting of 30 acres, was acquired by Henry Bevan in 1835. He enlarged the house and it was renamed Cambridge House. The property passed to a daughter Lady Caroline Chichester in 1860 and then to a grandson Sir Edward John Dean Paul, 4th Baronet. When Paul died in 1895 the estate was sold to a builder, Henry Cresswell Foulkes, who redeveloped the Cambridge Park estate. Cambridge House was demolished in 1930. Part of the park was later used as a munitions factory and Richmond Ice Rink.

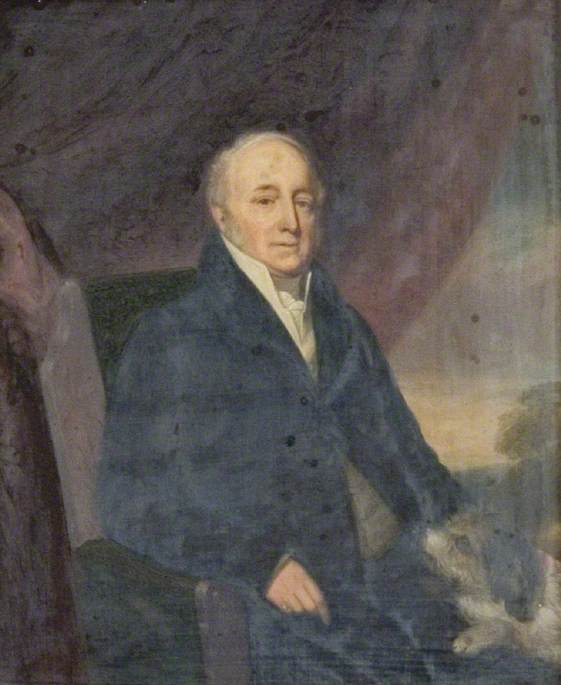
Lord Edgecumbe

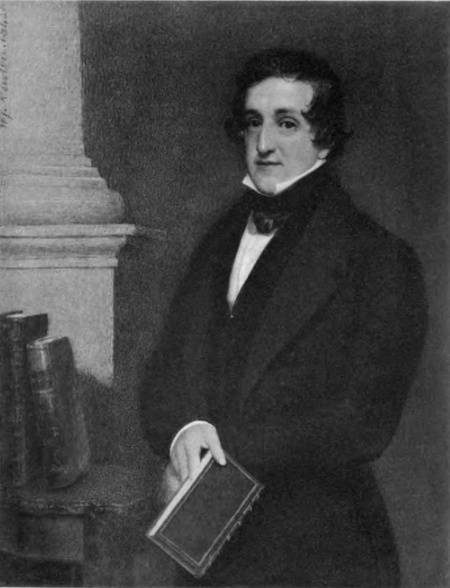
John Cam Hobhouse

== Meadowbank ==
George Cambridge built a house on the 44 acres at meadowbank where he lived, and built Meadowside Cottage nearby. In 1861 the property was occupied by George Bishop junior, who was an astronomer and built an observatory on the land. In 1863 Jeremiah Little took the property and redeveloped the surrounding land. The house was extended in 1926 and rebuilt in the 1960s.
