= Oakland, Jefferson County, Wisconsin =

Oakland, Wisconsin
- Town
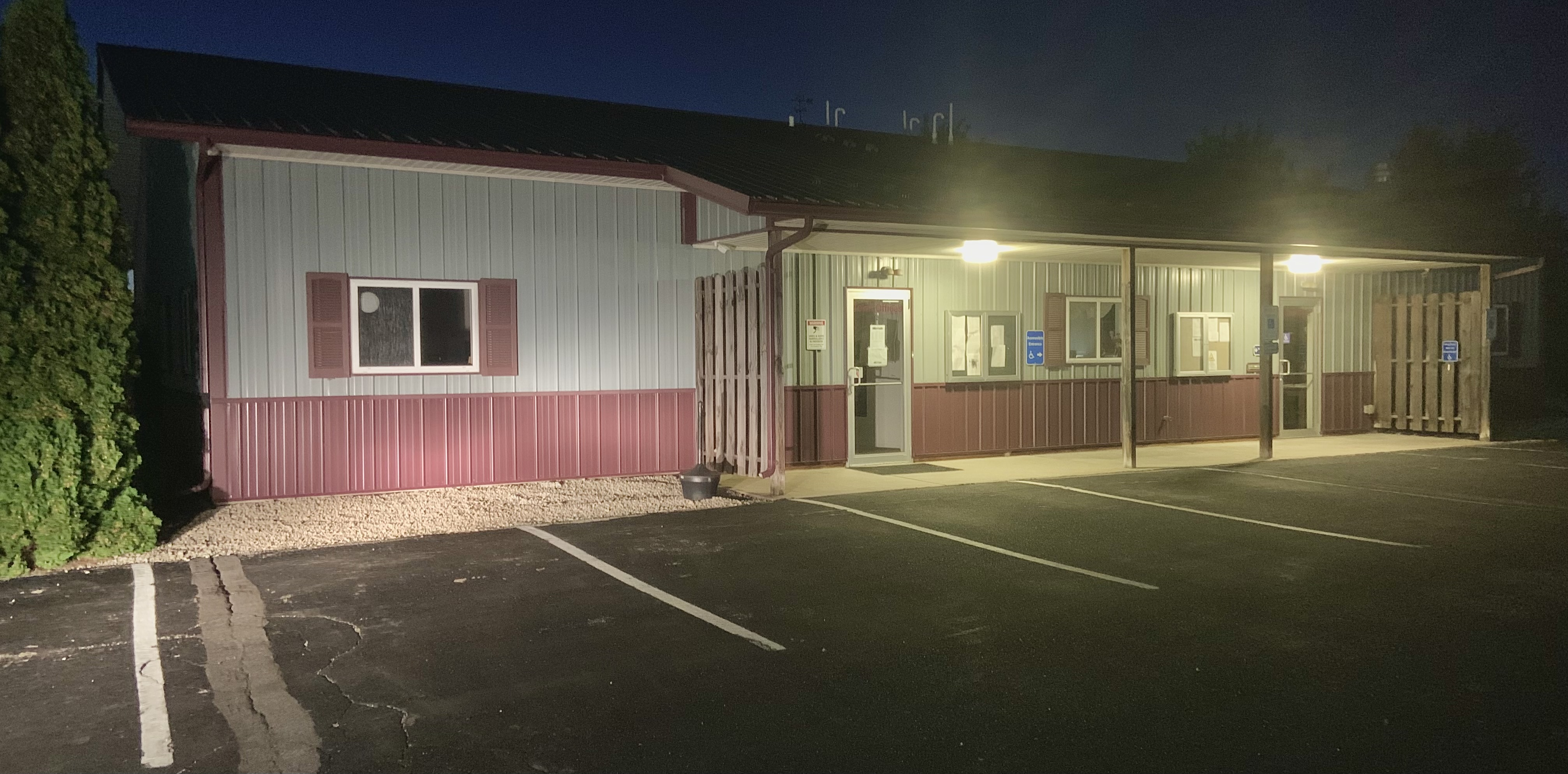
- Town hall

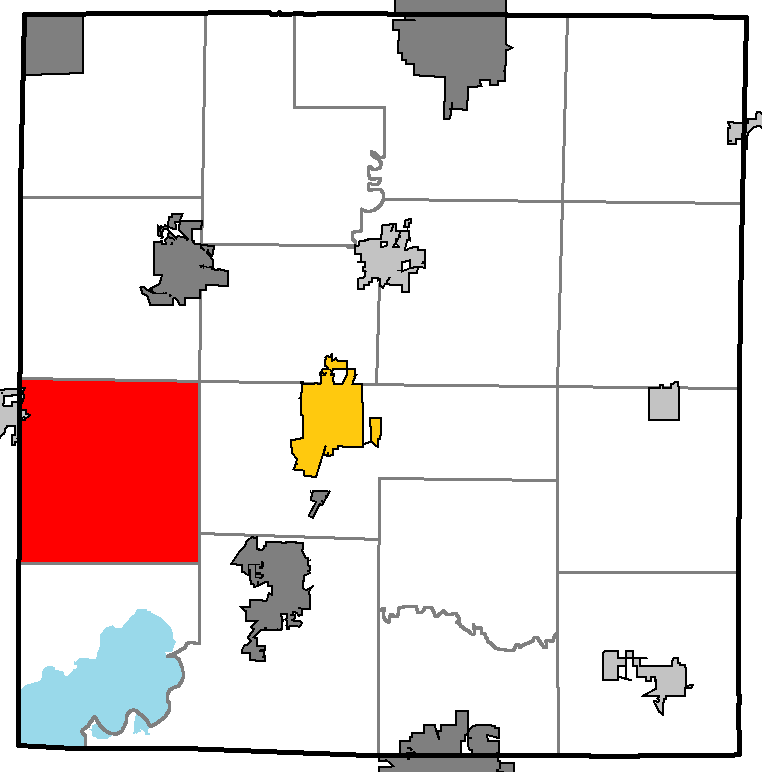
- Location of Oakland, within Jefferson County
- Coordinates: 42°59′16″N 88°57′56″W
- Country: United States
- State: Wisconsin
- County: Jefferson

Area
  - Total: 36.1 sq mi (93.5 km^{2})
  - Land: 34.6 sq mi (89.7 km^{2})
  - Water: 1.5 sq mi (3.8 km^{2})
- Elevation: 883 ft (269 m)

Population (2020)
  - Total: 3,231
  - Density: 93.3/sq mi (36.0/km^{2})
- Time zone: UTC-6 (Central (CST))
  - Summer (DST): UTC-5 (CDT)
- FIPS code: 55-59125
- GNIS feature ID: 1583845
- Website: https://oaklandtown.com/

Oakland is a town in Jefferson County, Wisconsin, United States. The population was 3,231 at the 2020 census. The unincorporated communities of Breezy Knoll, Oakland, and Sylvan Mounds, as well as the census-designated place of Lake Ripley, are located in the town.

== Geography ==
According to the United States Census Bureau, the town has a total area of 36.1 square miles (93.5 km^{2}), of which 34.6 square miles (89.7 km^{2}) is land and 1.5 square miles (3.8 km^{2}), or 4.09%, is water.

== Demographics ==
As of the census of 2000, there were 3,135 people, 1,236 households, and 877 families residing in the town. The population density was 89.9 people per square mile (34.7/km^{2}). There were 1,437 housing units at an average density of 41.2 per square mile (15.9/km^{2}). The racial makeup of the town was 98.37% White, 0.03% African American, 0.22% Native American, 0.16% Asian, 0.03% Pacific Islander, 0.35% from other races, and 0.83% from two or more races. Hispanic or Latino of any race were 1.31% of the population.

There were 1,236 households, out of which 33.0% had children under the age of 18 living with them, 61.3% were married couples living together, 6.9% had a female householder with no husband present, and 29.0% were non-families. 23.2% of all households were made up of individuals, and 7.8% had someone living alone who was 65 years of age or older. The average household size was 2.54 and the average family size was 3.01.

In the town, the population was spread out, with 25.4% under the age of 18, 5.6% from 18 to 24, 30.0% from 25 to 44, 27.1% from 45 to 64, and 12.0% who were 65 years of age or older. The median age was 40 years. For every 100 females, there were 97.4 males. For every 100 females age 18 and over, there were 99.0 males.

The median income for a household in the town was $54,412, and the median income for a family was $63,355. Males had a median income of $40,601 versus $27,317 for females. The per capita income for the town was $24,622. About 3.7% of families and 5.4% of the population were below the poverty line, including 5.3% of those under age 18 and 1.6% of those age 65 or over.

== Notable people ==
- Lewis Benson, Wisconsin State Representative
- J. B. Jenson, Wisconsin State Representative
- John W. Porter, Wisconsin State Representative, born in Oakland
- Gilbert Rutherford, Wisconsin State Representative, born in Oakland
- Billy Sullivan, Major League Baseball player, catcher for 1906 World Series champion Chicago White Sox, manager of White Sox in 1909; born in Oakland
