= Gilbert Rutherford =

American politician

Gilbert Rutherford (January 12, 1861 – March 31, 1927) was an American farmer and politician.

Born in the town of Oakland, Jefferson County, Wisconsin, Rutherford was a farmer and a director of the Oakland Fire Insurance Company. Rutherford served as chairman of the Oakland Town Board and assessor of the town of Oakland. Rutherford also served on the school board and was the board treasurer. Rutherford was involved in the Jefferson County Fair. In 1897, Rutherford served in the Wisconsin State Assembly and was a Republican. Rutherford died in Columbus, Wisconsin.
