= George Cambridge (priest) =

George Owen Cambridge (1756–1841) was an English churchman, Archdeacon of Middlesex from 1808.

== Life ==
George Cambridge was the youngest son of Richard Owen Cambridge and Mary Trenchard. He matriculated at The Queen's College, Oxford in 1774, and graduated B.A. there in 1778. He then became a Fellow of Merton College, Oxford and graduated with an M.A. there in 1781.

Cambridge was a supposed suitor of Frances Burney. Nothing came in the way of romance, though Sir William Weller Pepys, a friend of Burney, tried to throw the couple together. They had met through the Bluestockings; Burney's apparent interest in him was not returned.

Cambridge was rector of Myland in Essex from 1791 to 1795. He was a chaplain to Charles Manners-Sutton, and prebendary of Ely Cathedral from 1795. He became a good friend of Joshua Watson, a figure of the Hackney Phalanx group of High Church men. Cambridge was Archdeacon of Middlesex from 1808 to 1840, when he resigned. He became proprietor of Montpelier Row chapel, in Twickenham (unconsecrated). In 1814, when Watson, John Bowdler and James Allan Park saw the need for an urgent church building programme, they called on Cambridge and Charles Daubeny for action. He was Treasurer to the Society for Promoting Christian Knowledge and the Clergy Orphan Schools. He was involved also in King's College London and the National Society for Promoting Religious Education.

Upon his father's death in 1802, Cambridge came into possession of Cambridge House, located in Twickenham Meadows. Cambridge divided the estate in 1835.

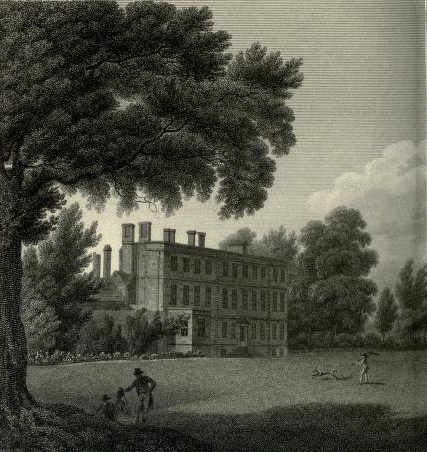
Twickenham Meadows, engraving by John Landseer after John Webber (detail)

He was an art collector: old masters and contemporary portraits. He presented a copy of a painting by Paolo Veronese, the Martyrdom of St George, to the Fitzwilliam Museum in 1835.

== Works ==
In 1803 he edited The Works of Richard Owen Cambridge, with an account of his life and character by his son, George Owen Cambridge. It contained much verse that had not yet been published.

== Family ==
He married Cornelia Kuyck van Mierop in 1795.

== Archdeacon Cambridge's schools ==
From 1842 there have been "Archdeacon Cambridge's schools" in Twickenham, named as a memorial. They were designed by George Basevi.

== Sources ==
- "Cambridge, George Owen (1782–1806)". The Clergy of the Church of England Database 1540–1835. CCEd Person ID 5102.
- WorldCat page, WorldCat page variant
- CERL page
