= Cambridge International School (Moscow) =

CIS International School is a family of international schools and kindergartens, which are part of CIS Education Group. The school was founded in 2009 and now has over 800 students from more than 20 different countries. Children from expatriate families (embassy workers or employees of multinational companies) and prominent Russian families study Cambridge International Curriculum provided by Cambridge International Examinations, the world’s largest provider of international education programmes and qualifications for 5–19 year olds. CIS Russia offers Early Years Preschool (2–5 years), Cambridge Primary (5–11 years), Cambridge Secondary 1 (11–14 years), Cambridge Secondary 2 (14–16 years, IGCSE) and Cambridge Advanced (16–19 years, A-levels and Cambridge Pre-U). CIE qualifications are recognised for admission by UK universities (including Cambridge) as well as universities in the United States, Canada, European Union, Middle East, West Asia, New Zealand, India, Pakistan, Sri Lanka and around the world.

== Campuses ==
CIS Education Group has following campuses:

- Campus 1 – CIS Skolkovo Campus, located in Russia (Early Years, Primary school, Secondary School and Sixth Form)
- Campus 2 – CIS Moscow Campus, located in Russia (Early Years, Primary school, Secondary School to Y10)
- Campus 3 – CIS Saint Petersburg Campus, located in Russia (Early Years, Primary school, Secondary School and Sixth Form)
- Campus 4 – CIS Tashkent Campus, located in Uzbekistan (Early Years, Primary school, Secondary School and Sixth Form)
- Campus 5 – CIS Gorki Campus, located in Russia (Early Years, Primary school, Secondary School and Sixth Form)

== Tuition fees ==
The tuition fees range from 15.000 EUR + 3 000 EUR (entrance fee) to 30.000 EUR + 6 000 EUR (entrance fee), covers meals and books, but does not include transport services, private lessons, summer courses, and the school uniform.
