= HMS Cambridge =

Five ships and a shore establishment of the Royal Navy have borne the name HMS Cambridge, after the English town of Cambridge or after one of the Dukes of Cambridge:

- HMS Cambridge (1666) was a 70-gun third rate ship of the line launched in 1666 and wrecked in 1694.
- HMS Cambridge (1695) was an 80-gun third rate ship of the line launched in 1695. She was rebuilt in 1715 and broken up in 1750.
- HMS Cambridge (1755) was an 80-gun third rate ship of the line launched in 1755. She was on harbour service from 1793 and was broken up in 1808.
- HMS Cambridge (1815) was an 80-gun second rate launched in 1815. She became a gunnery training ship in 1856 and was broken up in 1869.
- HMS Cambridge (1869) was a 116-gun first rate launched in 1858 as HMS Windsor Castle. She was renamed HMS Cambridge in 1869 when she replaced the 1815 vessel as gunnery ship off Plymouth. She was sold in 1908.
- HMS Cambridge (shore establishment), commissioned as a shore establishment between 1956 and 2001 (formerly named HM Gunnery School, Devonport, then Cambridge Gunnery School at Wembury).

== See also ==
- HMT Cambridgeshire
