= Richard Owen Cambridge =

English poet

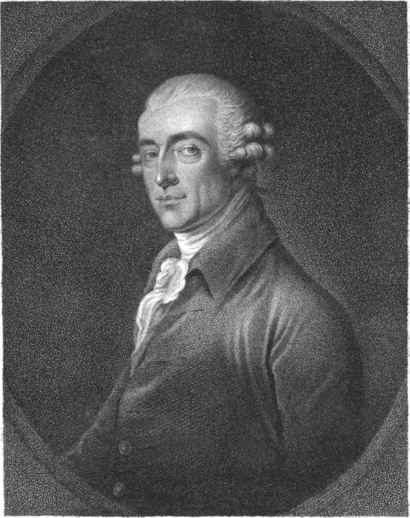
An illustration of Cambridge

Richard Owen Cambridge (14 February 1717 – 17 September 1802) was an English poet.

== Life ==
Cambridge was born in London. He was educated at Eton in 1732 and at St John's College, Oxford. Leaving the university without taking a degree, he took up residence at Lincolns Inn in 1737. Four years later he married, and went to live at his country seat of Whitminster, Gloucestershire. In 1751 he removed to Twickenham Meadows, where he enjoyed the society of many notable persons. Horace Walpole in his letters makes many humorous allusions to Cambridge in the character of newsmonger. Cambridge died in Twickenham and is buried at St Mary's Church, Twickenham.

== Works ==
Cambridge's major work was the Scribleriad (1751), a mock epic poem, the hero of which is the Martinus Scriblerus of Alexander Pope, John Arbuthnot and Jonathan Swift. The poem is preceded by a dissertation on the mock heroic, in which he avows Miguel de Cervantes as his master. It is full of literary in-jokes.

The Account of the War in India on the Coast of Coromandel (1761) from the year 1750 to 1760. Robert Orme, who had promised Cambridge the use of his papers, limited the work carried out in favour of a project of his own.

The Works of Richard Owen Cambridge included several pieces never before published. It contained an Account of his Life and Character by his son, George Owen Cambridge (1803), the Scribleriad, some narrative and satirical poems, and about twenty papers originally published in Edward Moore's paper, The World. Cambridge's poems were included in Alexander Chalmers' English Poets (1816).
