= Cambridge Circus =

Cambridge Circus may refer to:

- Cambridge Circus, London, a traffic junction (formerly a roundabout) in London, England
- Cambridge Circus (economics), a group of economists who worked with the famous economist John Maynard Keynes
- Cambridge Circus (comedy), a comedy revue that played in London in the 1960s
