= Cambridge, Wisconsin =

- Village
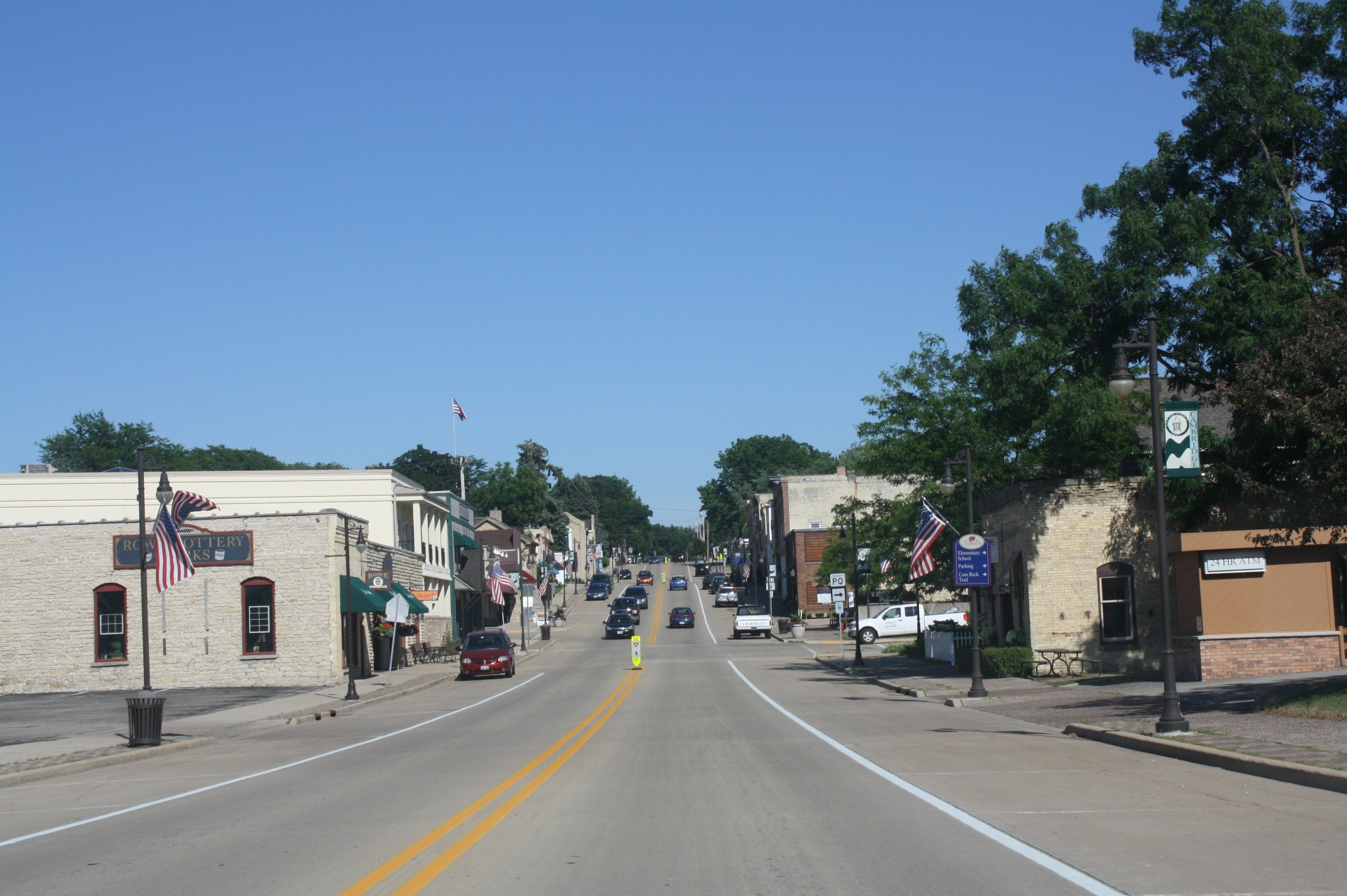
- Downtown Cambridge (US 12)

- Location of Cambridge in Jefferson County, Wisconsin.
- Coordinates: 43°0′15″N 89°1′2″W
- Country: United States
- State: Wisconsin
- Counties: Dane, Jefferson

Government
  - Type: Village Board of Trustees
  - President: Kris James Breunig

Area
  - Total: 1.48 sq mi (3.83 km^{2})
  - Land: 1.47 sq mi (3.81 km^{2})
  - Water: 0.0077 sq mi (0.02 km^{2})
- Elevation: 850 ft (260 m)

Population (2020)
  - Total: 1,638
  - Density: 1,042.6/sq mi (402.54/km^{2})
- Time zone: UTC-6 (Central (CST))
  - Summer (DST): UTC-5 (CDT)
- Area code: 608
- FIPS code: 55-12225
- GNIS feature ID: 1562561
- Website: cambridgewi.gov

Cambridge is a village in Dane and Jefferson counties in the U.S. state of Wisconsin. The population was 1,638 at the 2020 census, of which 1,539 were in Dane County and 99 were in Jefferson County. The Dane County portion is part of the Madison Metropolitan Area and the Jefferson County portion a part of the Watertown–Fort Atkinson micropolitan statistical area, which itself is part of the larger Milwaukee-Racine-Waukesha Combined Statistical Area.

== History ==
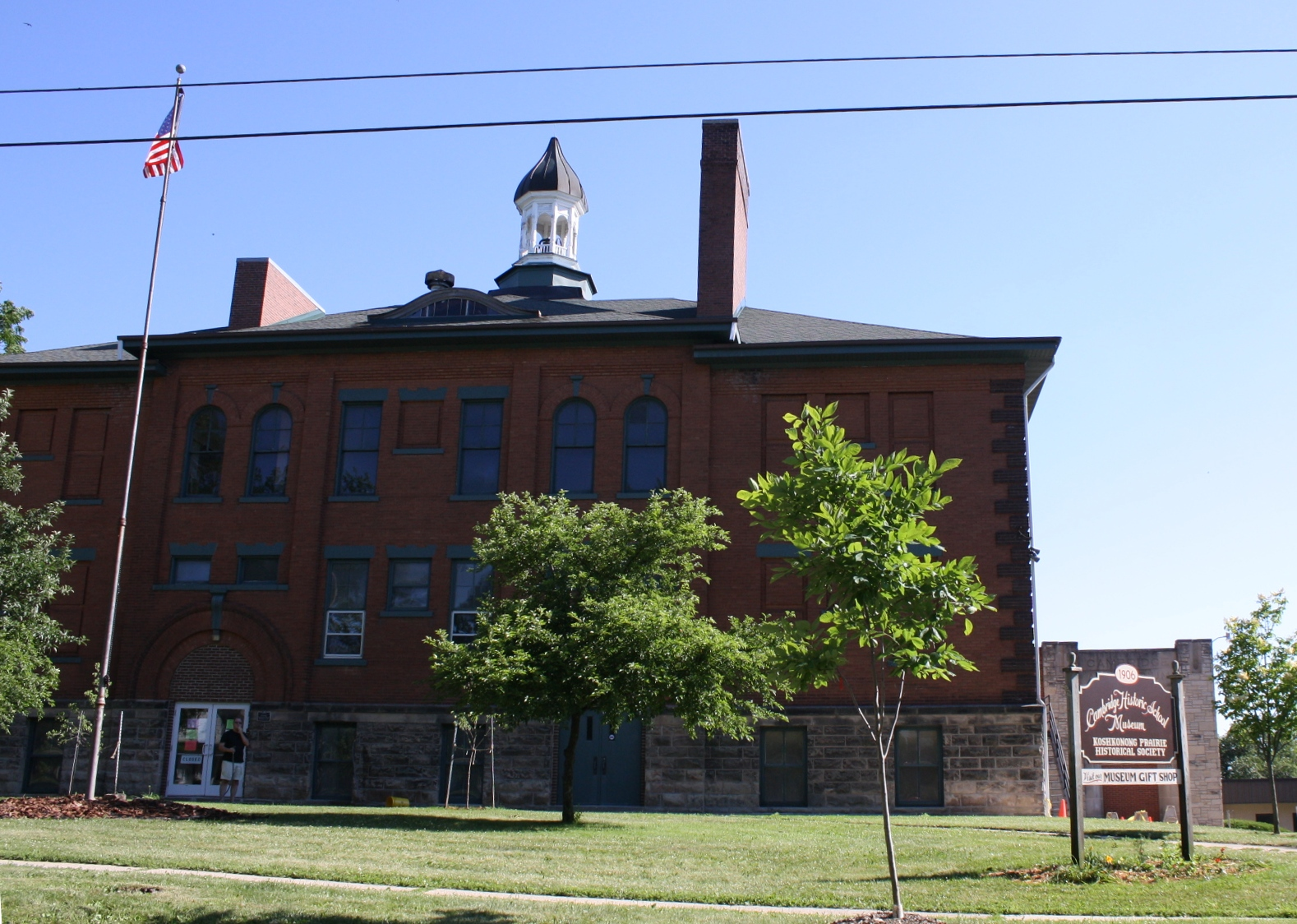
Historic Cambridge Public School and High School

The settlement of Cambridge dates back to October 15, 1847, when the farmer Joseph Keyes filed plans with the Register of Deeds of Dane County. The first structure in the area was a dam on the northern part of Koshkonong Creek. By the late 1880s, Cambridge had grown into a community of about 700 people with shops, hotels, and a post office. Future inventor Ole Evinrude lived there. In 1890 a devastating fire broke out, destroying most of the businesses and parts of Main Street.

The town was rebuilt by 1910, following the fire, and the invention of the automobile ignited tourism. Nearby Lake Ripley became a destination for many Chicago travelers.

During the 1980s and 1990s, Cambridge was touted as the "salt glaze pottery capital of the world" because of the potteries located there.

After Cambridge lost much of its pottery draw, the village began to draw mountain bikers from southeastern Wisconsin. CamRock County Park offers trails for hiking and cross-country skiing, and a 16-mile mountain bike track.

== Geography ==
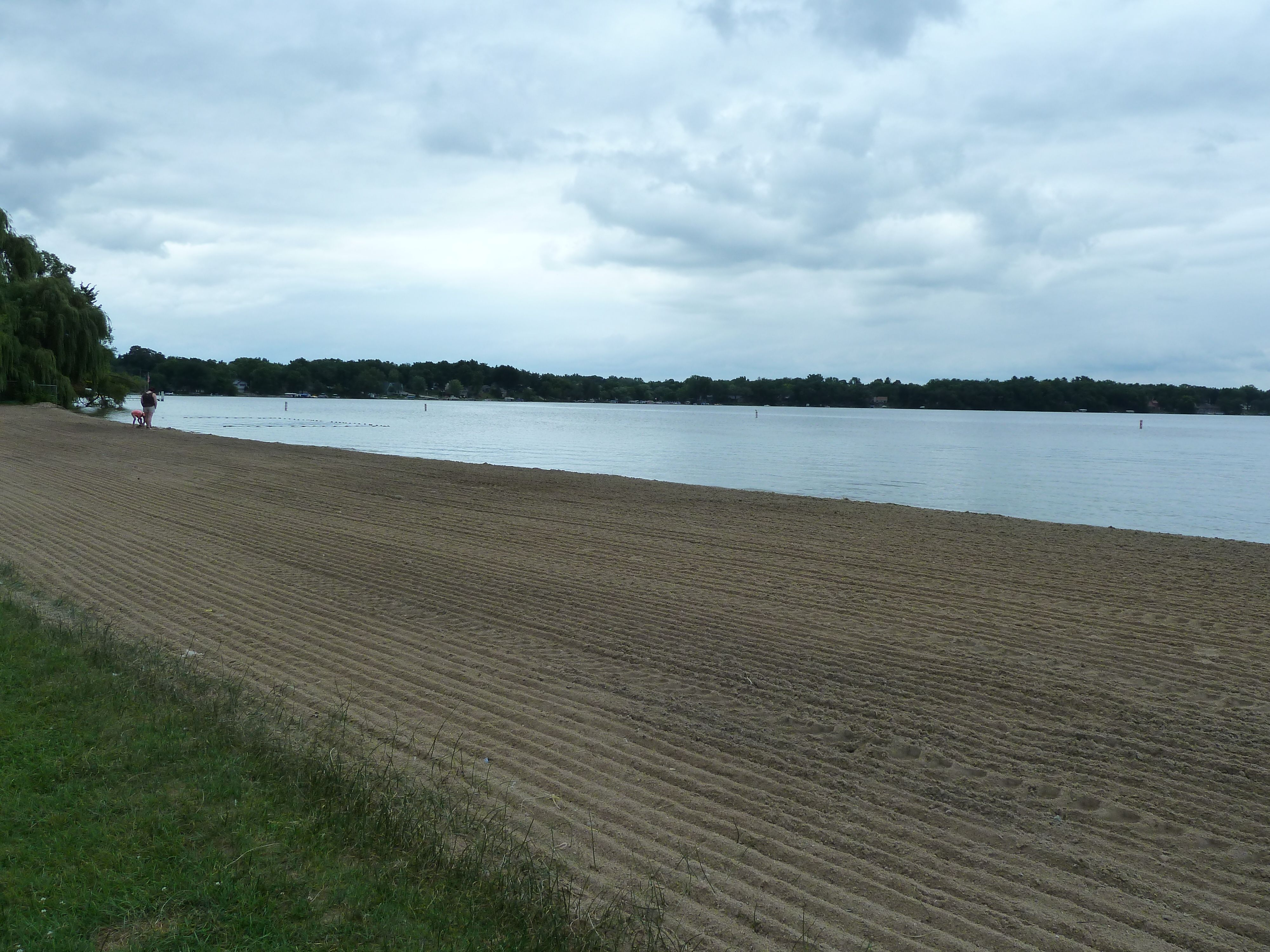
Lake Ripley

Cambridge is located at 43°0′15″N 89°1′2″W (43.004089, -89.017201).

According to the United States Census Bureau, the village has a total area of 1.44 square miles (3.73 km^{2}), of which 1.43 square miles (3.70 km^{2}) is land and 0.01 square miles (0.03 km^{2}) is water. Koshkonong Creek runs through the center of the village, flowing south to Lake Koshkonong.

== Demographics ==
Historical population
Census	Pop.	Note	%±
1880	303		—
1890	452		49.2%
1910	507		—
1920	490		−3.4%
1930	500		2.0%
1940	577		15.4%
1950	552		−4.3%
1960	605		9.6%
1970	689		13.9%
1980	844		22.5%
1990	963		14.1%
2000	1,101		14.3%
2010	1,457		32.3%
2020	1,638		12.4%
U.S. Decennial Census

=== 2010 census ===
As of the census of 2010, there were 1,457 people, 615 households, and 397 families living in the village. The population density was 1,018.9 inhabitants per square mile (393.4/km^{2}). There were 654 housing units at an average density of 457.3 units per square mile (176.6 units/km^{2}). The racial makeup of the village was 96.8% White, 0.9% African American, 0.3% Native American, 0.5% Asian, 0.5% from other races, and 1.1% from two or more races. Hispanic or Latino of any race were 1.7% of the population.

There were 615 households, of which 32.0% had children under the age of 18 living with them, 52.4% were married couples living together, 8.5% had a female householder with no husband present, 3.7% had a male householder with no wife present, and 35.4% were non-families. 28.3% of all households were made up of individuals, and 14.6% had someone living alone who was 65 years of age or older. The average household size was 2.37 and the average family size was 2.93.

The median age in the village was 41.3 years. 24.4% of residents were under the age of 18; 6.1% were between the ages of 18 and 24; 25.1% were from 25 to 44; 30.2% were from 45 to 64; and 14.1% were 65 years of age or older. The gender makeup of the village was 48.2% male and 51.8% female.

=== 2000 census ===
As of the census of 2000, there were 1,101 people, 470 households, and 303 families living in the village. The population density was 1,238.5 people per square mile (478.2 people/km^{2}). There were 483 housing units at an average density of 543.3 units per square mile (209.8 units/km^{2}). The racial makeup of the village was 98.55% White, 0.09% African American, 0.18% Native American, 0.27% Asian, 0.45% from other races, and 0.45% from two or more races. Hispanic or Latino of any race were 1.00% of the population.

There were 470 households, out of which 32.6% had children under the age of 18 living with them, 53.8% were married couples living together, 7.7% had a female householder with no husband present, and 35.5% were non-families. 29.8% of all households were made up of individuals, and 17.0% had someone living alone who was 65 years of age or older. The average household size was 2.32 and the average family size was 2.89.

In the village, the population was spread out, with 24.3% under the age of 18, 5.5% from 18 to 24, 29.5% from 25 to 44, 21.1% from 45 to 64, and 19.5% who were 65 years of age or older. The median age was 40 years. For every 100 females, there were 91.5 males. For every 100 females age 18 and over, there were 85.1 males.

The median income for a household in the village was $52,039, and the median income for a family was $57,895. Males had a median income of $37,986 versus $29,018 for females. The per capita income for the village was $22,599. About 0.6% of families and 4.4% of the population were below the poverty line, including 1.4% of those under age 18 and 7.1% of those age 65 or over.

== Media ==
Cambridge is home to a weekly newspaper, The Cambridge News and Deerfield Independent, covering as its name suggests both communities.

Cambridge is a part of the Madison radio and television market, stations from the Milwaukee market are also available over the air and via cable, satellite and OTT services in the Jefferson County portion of the village.

== Notable people ==
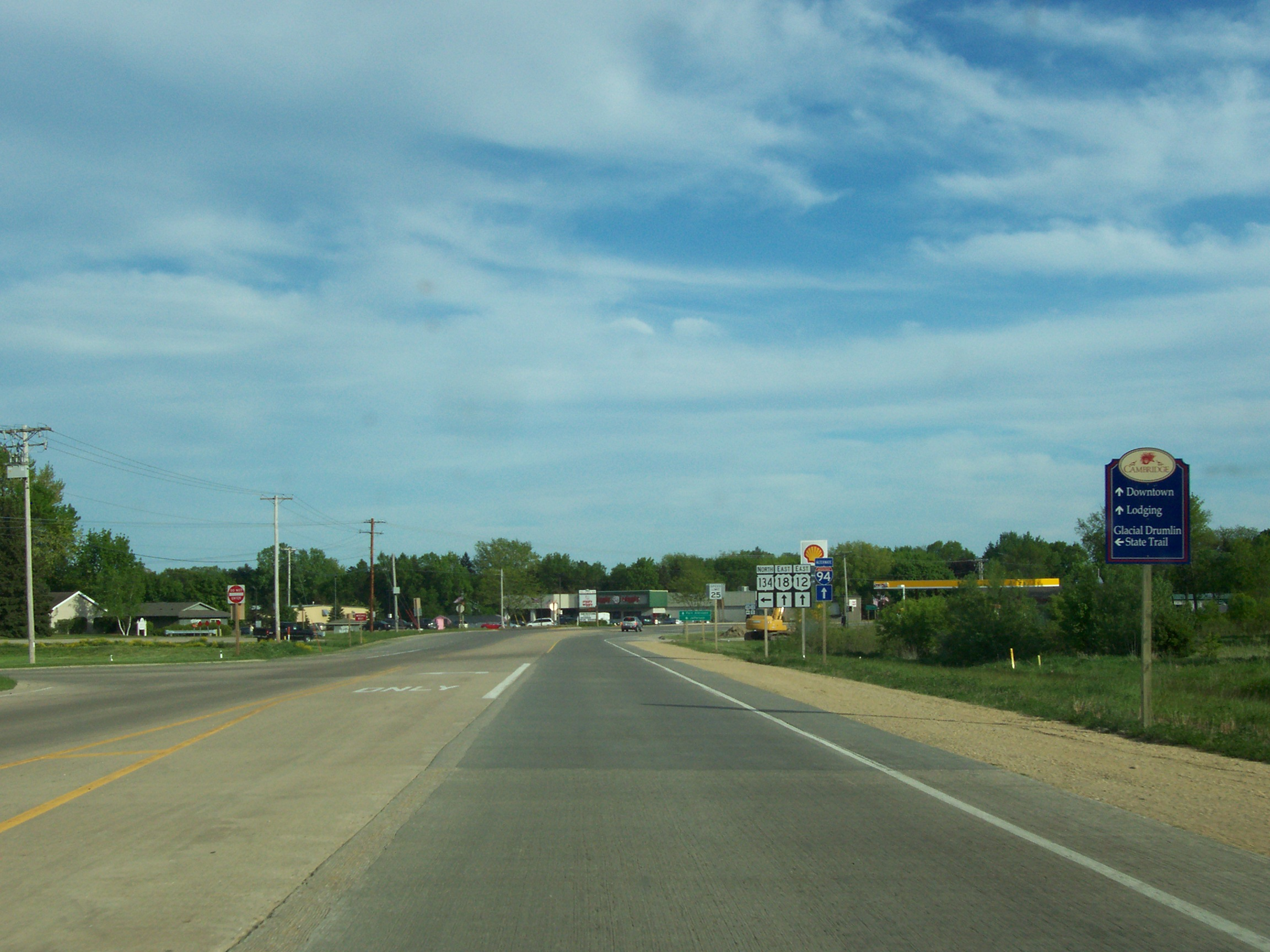
Looking east while entering Cambridge on Highway 12/18

- Carolyn Blanchard Allen, Wisconsin state representative
- Arthur Davidson, one of four original founders of Harley-Davidson
- Ole Evinrude, inventor of the outboard marine engine and founder of Evinrude
- Matt Kenseth, 2003 NASCAR Winston Cup Champion
- Christopher Legreid, Wisconsin State Representative
- John W. Porter, Wisconsin State Representative
- Jason Schuler, former NASCAR driver
