= Cambridge, South Africa =

Cambridge
- Location within Eastern Cape Location within South Africa
- Coordinates: 32.976°S 27.884°E
- Country: South Africa
- Province: Eastern Cape
- Municipality: Buffalo City

Area
  - Total: 1.69 km^{2} (0.65 sq mi)

Population (2011)
  - Total: 4,277
  - Density: 2,530/km^{2} (6,550/sq mi)

Racial makeup (2011)
  - Black African: 29.2%
  - Coloured: 8.5%
  - Indian/Asian: 2.4%
  - White: 59.3%
  - Other: 0.6%

First languages (2011)
  - English: 53.2%
  - Afrikaans: 24.8%
  - Xhosa: 19.1%
  - Other: 2.9%
- Time zone: UTC+2 (SAST)
- Postal code (street): 5247
- PO box: 5206

Cambridge is a suburb of East London, part of the Buffalo City Metropolitan Municipality in the Eastern Cape province of South Africa.
