= Cambridge School (Neermarga) =

Coordinates: 12.89315°N 74.89376°E

Location
- Neermarga, Paldane; Mangaluru, Karnataka; India

Information
- Type: CBSE
- Motto: Love, Peace
- Founder: Mrs. Flavia and Mr. Collins Albuquerque
- School district: Dakshina Kannada
- Website: http://cambridgeschoolmangalore.com

The Cambridge School was established by Mr. Collins and Mrs. Flavia Albuquerque. The school is affiliated to CBSE.

The principal is currently Mrs. Anupama Shetty. The school was established in 2007 and is located at Paldane in Mangaluru.

== Facilities and amenities ==
The various facilities offered by this school are

- Science Lab
- Audio visual Lab
- Swimming pool
- Playground
- Dance classes
- Music classes
- Sports classes
- Arts/craft classes
