= Lewis Benson (politician) =

American politician

Lewis Foinglos Benson (October 23, 1850 – February 2, 1926) was a Democratic member of the Wisconsin State Assembly from 1899 through 1903. A native of Oakland, Jefferson County, Wisconsin, he represented the 2nd District of Jefferson County, Wisconsin.
