= Lake Ripley, Wisconsin =

Census-designated place in Wisconsin, United States

- Census-designated place
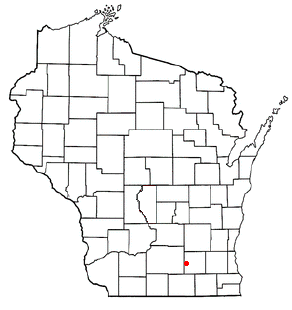
- Location of Lake Ripley, Wisconsin
- Coordinates: 43°0′25″N 88°59′20″W
- Country: United States
- State: Wisconsin
- County: Jefferson
- Town: Oakland

Area
  - Total: 2.6 sq mi (6.7 km^{2})
  - Land: 1.9 sq mi (5.0 km^{2})
  - Water: 0.66 sq mi (1.7 km^{2})
- Elevation: 853 ft (260 m)

Population (2020)
  - Total: 1,911
  - Density: 990/sq mi (380/km^{2})
- Time zone: UTC-6 (Central (CST))
  - Summer (DST): UTC-5 (CDT)
- FIPS code: 55-41765
- GNIS feature ID: 1867659

Lake Ripley is a census-designated place (CDP), in the town of Oakland, Jefferson County, Wisconsin, United States. The population was 1,911 at the 2020 census.

== Geography ==
Lake Ripley is located at 43°0′25″N 88°59′20″W (43.007064, -88.988950).

According to the United States Census Bureau, the CDP has a total area of 2.6 square miles (6.7 km^{2}), of which 1.9 square miles (5.0 km^{2}) is land and 0.6 square mile (1.7 km^{2}) (24.90%) is water.

== Demographics ==
Historical population
Census	Pop.	Note	%±
2000	1,603		—
2010	1,779		11.0%
2020	1,911		7.4%
U.S. Decennial Census

As of the census of 2000, there were 1,603 people, 656 households, and 444 families residing in the CDP. The population density was 830.7 people per square mile (320.7/km^{2}). There were 841 housing units at an average density of 435.8/sq mi (168.2/km^{2}). The racial makeup of the CDP was 98.32% White, 0.12% Native American, 0.12% Asian, 0.06% Pacific Islander, 0.50% from other races, and 0.87% from two or more races. Hispanic or Latino of any race were 2.12% of the population.

There were 656 households, out of which 31.3% had children under the age of 18 living with them, 57.5% were married couples living together, 7.6% had a female householder with no husband present, and 32.3% were non-families. 25.5% of all households were made up of individuals, and 8.1% had someone living alone who was 65 years of age or older. The average household size was 2.44 and the average family size was 2.95.

In the CDP, the population was spread out, with 25.0% under the age of 18, 4.7% from 18 to 24, 30.7% from 25 to 44, 26.3% from 45 to 64, and 13.3% who were 65 years of age or older. The median age was 40 years. For every 100 females, there were 94.5 males. For every 100 females age 18 and over, there were 99.3 males.

The median income for a household in the CDP was $51,420, and the median income for a family was $64,327. Males had a median income of $40,521 versus $27,500 for females. The per capita income for the CDP was $25,692. About 4.5% of families and 6.6% of the population were below the poverty line, including 3.7% of those under age 18 and 1.5% of those age 65 or over.

== Lake ==
The census-designated place of Lake Ripley has a Lake Ripley. The lake produced Wisconsin's largest largemouth bass. Caught on October 12, 1940, it weighed 11 pounds, 3 ounces. Lake Ripley is also the place where Ole Evinrude first used his newly invented outboard motor.
