= The Cambridge School, Doha, Qatar =

Coordinates: 25.144379°N 51.301707°E

The Cambridge School
- Doha; Qatar

Information
- Type: Private
- Motto: "Lead Kindly Light"
- Established: 2001
- Director: Jayashankar Pillai
- Principal: Ozmetin İnanç
- Grades: KG-Y13
- Gender: Boys & Girls
- Enrollment: approx. 1500
- Language: English Arabic
- Publication: TCS Weekly Gazette (English and Arabic)
- Curriculum: National Curriculum for England; Cambridge International Examinations Board
- Houses: Eagles; Falcons; Hawks; Kestrels
- Website: tcsqatar.com tcs.ethdigitalcampus.com/DigitalSchoolWeb

The Cambridge School (Arabic: مدرسة كامبردج الدوحة) (also known as TCS) is a private international school that is located in Doha, Qatar, the school provides an education based on the National Curriculum for England to students from Kindergarten to Year 13. The school prepares students for the IGCSE, AS and A Level, following the Cambridge International Examinations Board. The school has grown from just under 300 students seven years ago to almost over 1,500 students with over 60 different nationalities. Some of the teachers are from the United Kingdom, although most of them are from South Africa and India. The school is founded by Mohammed Taleb Mohammed Al Khouri and managed by the Taleb Group. The company also own and manage two other schools in Qatar, Cambridge International School for Girls and Doha Modern Indian School.

The school is organised into three sections: Kindergarten, Primary, and Secondary. Each section has a Head of Section. The Cambridge School also has a sixth form. The Primary and Secondary sections are further divided into key stages. Boys and girls are taught together in all grades. Students enrolled at TCS come from countries such as Qatar, Egypt, Pakistan, Indonesia, Malaysia, Palestine, and many more countries. All graduating students of Grade 11, 12 and 13 receive IGCSE, AS and A Level certificates from Cambridge International Examinations.

== History ==
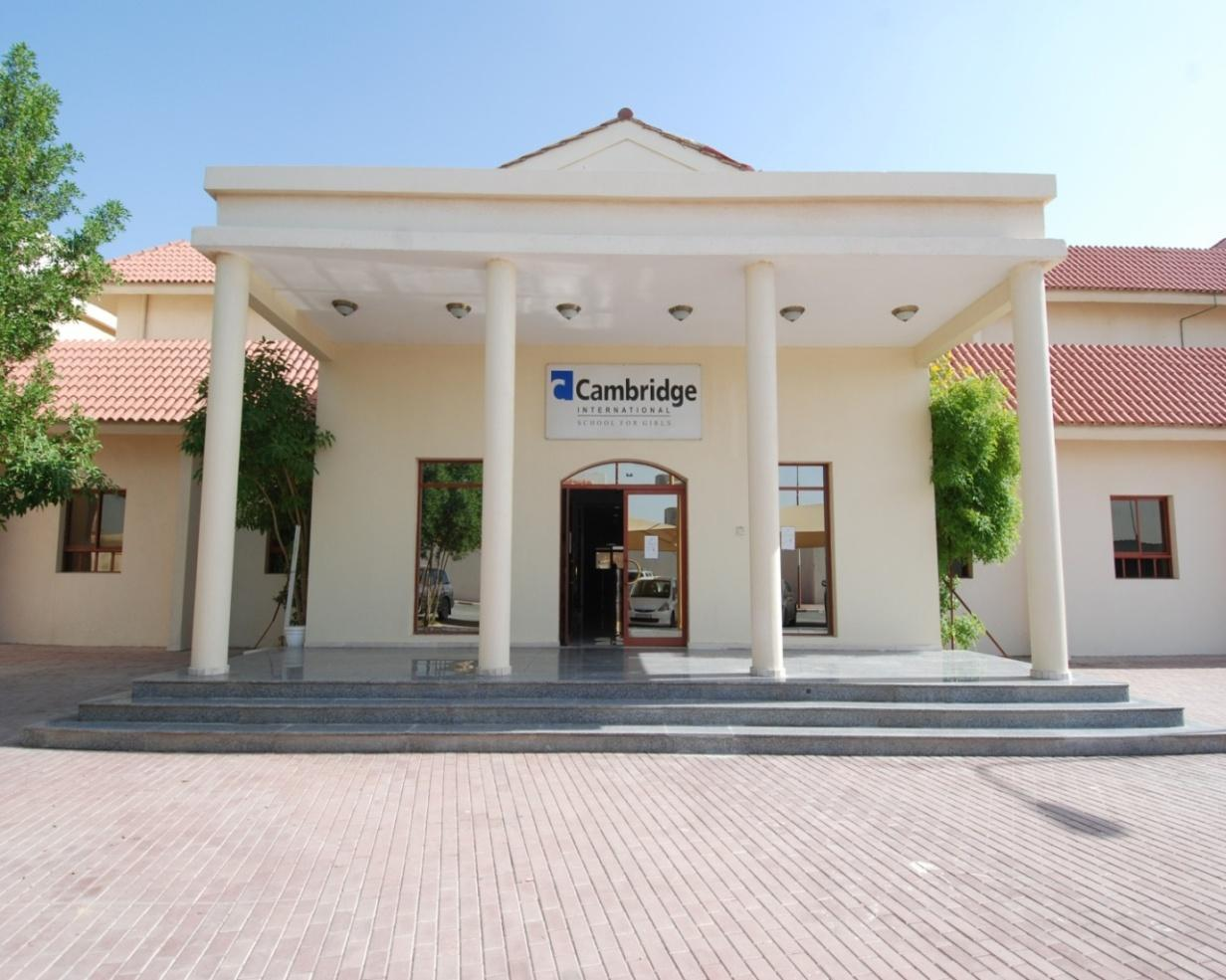
CISG campus

The Cambridge School Doha was founded in 2001 and opened in September 2002 with under 300 students. In 2003, The school started to offer IGCSE followed by A Level in 2005. The school inducted its first ever group of prefects in May 2003. Eighteen senior students were sworn in as house captains, vice captains and prefects.

Cambridge International School for Girls, established in 2004 with the primary objective of providing education for girls. CISG provides the National Curriculum for England and Wales, delivered in English by mostly native speakers. It has a thriving Kindergarten and Primary School, both based around the Early Years emergent curriculum. The Secondary School is only for girls offering IGCSE and A Level. CISG is the first school for girls alone from year 5 onwards in the private sector.

In 2008, Taleb Group took over the management of the schools. The management of the schools which was previously carried out by the GEMS Education of the Varkey Group, were undertaken by the Taleb Group.

== Curriculum ==
Cambridge School Doha campus

The Cambridge School Doha offers the National Curriculum for England with the addition of Arabic and Islamic Studies for students from Kindergarten up to Year 9. GradeT3-9 are also provided Qatar History. he Kindergarten follows the Early Years Foundation Stage and Primary and Secondary follow the British Curriculum. Toward the end of Year 9, students will make some choices about subjects for the International General Certificate Secondary Education (IGCSE) offered through the Cambridge International Examinations Board (CIE). After IGCSE, students will continue to study Advanced Supplementary (AS) and Advanced Level (A level) subjects mainly under the Cambridge International Examinations Board.

The main subjects taught in school consist in three levels: Core, Foundation, and Additional Subjects. Core subjects include English, Mathematics, Science, and ICT. The Foundation subjects include History, Geography, Art, Music, Physical Education, and a selection of second languages, which include French and Arabic. Additional subjects include Arabic for both native and non-native speakers, Islamic Studies for Muslim students as well as Moral Education. The school offers IGCSE for Years 10 and 11. Students must take a minimum of eight subjects which consist of two compulsory subjects and six elective subjects. AS and A Level offered for students in Years 12 and 13. Students must take a minimum of three subjects and a maximum of four subjects. Students who wish to continue AS and A Level must have a minimum of five subjects with a grade C in IGCSE and a grade B to take Mathematics, Physics, and Chemistry.

The Cambridge School Doha offers a Sixth Form for students in Years 12 and 13 since 2005. The sixth form provides AS Level for Year 12 and A Level for students in Year 13. The school provides the same courses as a sixth form college in England. Uniform is different for Sixth Form students; they must wear their formal suit. In Year 12, students may choose between three and four AS Level subjects to study. The school holds a sixth form open evening for students and provides them with choice application forms. Grade 12 and 13 can also contribute in community service in their free lessons. Community service is only held in school during school hours.

== School life ==
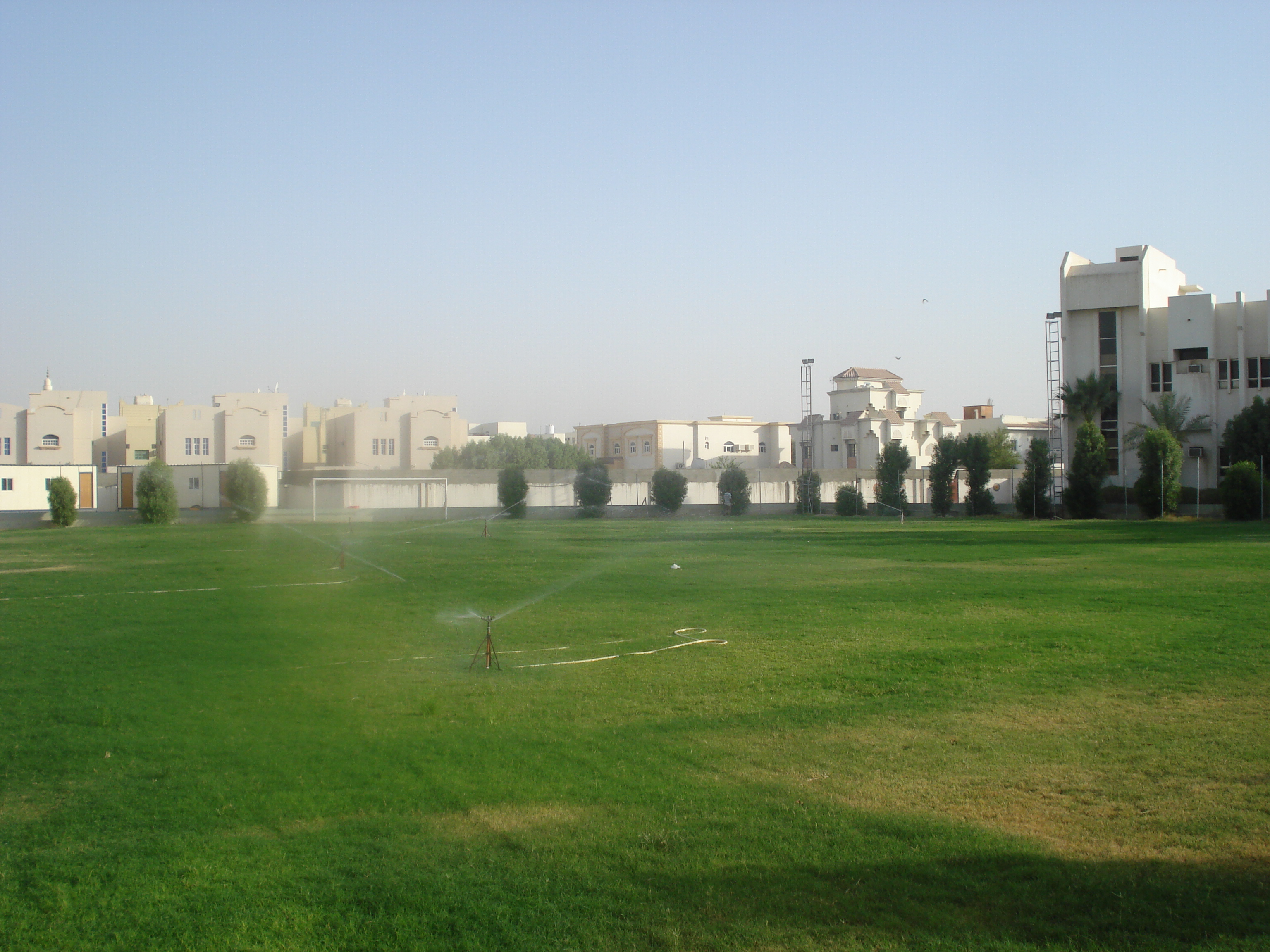
Football field

=== Extracurricular ===
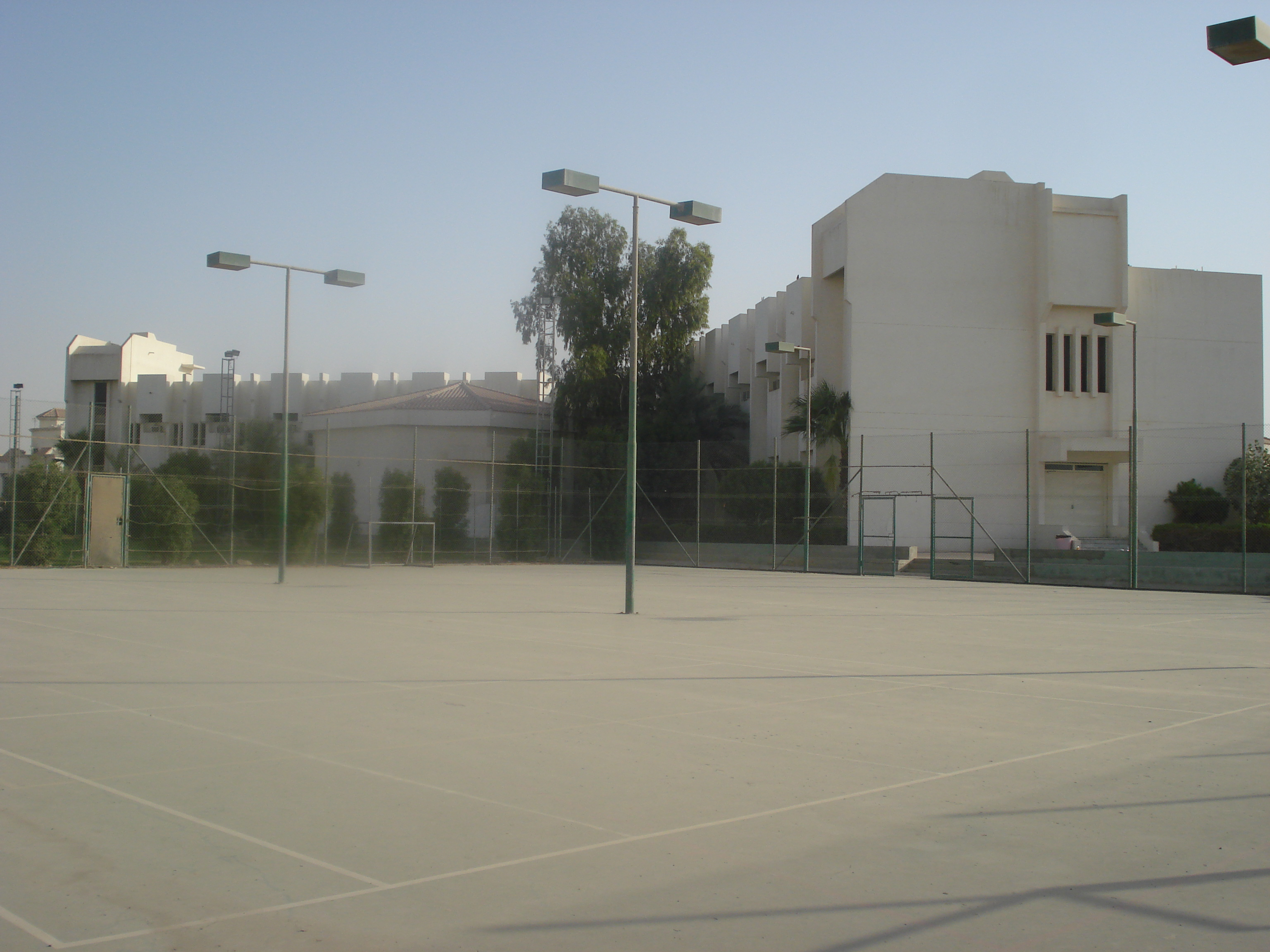
Basketball court

The school also offers after-school activities. All students are expected to participate on Mondays and Tuesdays. Monday is for students in Years 2 – 4 and Tuesday is for students in Years 5 – 13. The activities include sports activities, science club, debate, and drama. Some students will be directed to certain activities such as additional graded Arabic or English courses.

The Cambridge School has been regularly active in opportunities outside of school, some of those include Interschool debate, CS4Qatar at Carnegie Mellon University in Qatar, and Qatar Debate
