= Cambridge, Missouri =

Human settlement in Missouri, USA

Coordinates: 39°15′28″N 92°56′56″W

Cambridge is an extinct town in Saline County, in the U.S. state of Missouri. The GNIS classifies it as a populated place.

Cambridge was laid out in 1848. With the construction of the railroad, business shifted to nearby places, and the population dwindled. A post office called Cambridge was established in 1845, and operated until 1903.
