= Cambridge (1825 ship) =

History

United Kingdom
- Name: Cambridge
- Builder: Three Rivers, Prince Edward Island
- Launched: 1825
- Fate: Foundered with no trace in April 1835

General characteristics
- Type: Full-rigged ship
- Tons burthen: 53316/94, or 536 (bm)
- Length: 126 ft 7 in (38.6 m) (keel)
- Beam: 30 ft 7 in (9.3 m) (above the wales)
- Propulsion: Sail
- Notes: Two decks; three masts

Cambridge was launched in 1825 at Prince Edward Island, Canada. In 1826 she transferred her registry to Bristol, Gloucestershire, England. In 1827 she transported convicts to New South Wales, Australia. She foundered in 1835.

== Career ==
Her owners registered her at Bristol on 13 May 1826, as No.61. Her master for much of her career was Richard Pearse, (or Pearce, or Pierce).

On 2 June 1827 Pearse and Cambridge left Dublin for New South Wales. They arrived there on 17 September. She embarked 200 male prisoners and two died en route; she disembarked 198. The 39th Regiment of Foot provided the guard. At the time, the 39th was transferring to Australia and Cambridge carried Colonel Patrick Lindesay as a passenger, as well as his headquarters and the regimental band, which became the second band in the colony. Cambridge left for Batavia and Singapore in early October.

Year	Master	Owner	Trade	Source & notes
1828	R.Pearce	Cambridge	London–New South Wales	LR
1829	R.Pearce	Cambridge	Cowes–Antwerp	LR
1830	R.Pearce	Cambridge	Bristol–Sierra Leone	LR
1831	R.Pearce	Reynolds	Bristol–Philadelphia	LR
1832	R.Pearce; Gasken	Cambridge	Hull–Dantzig	LR; good repair 1832

By 1835 Cambridge's master was C. Gardner.

== Loss ==
Cambridge departed from Bristol, Gloucestershire, bound for Quebec City, Canada, on 22 April 1835. There was no further trace of her; she was presumed to have foundered with the loss of all hands.
