= Cambridge Public School and High School =

- U.S. National Register of Historic Places
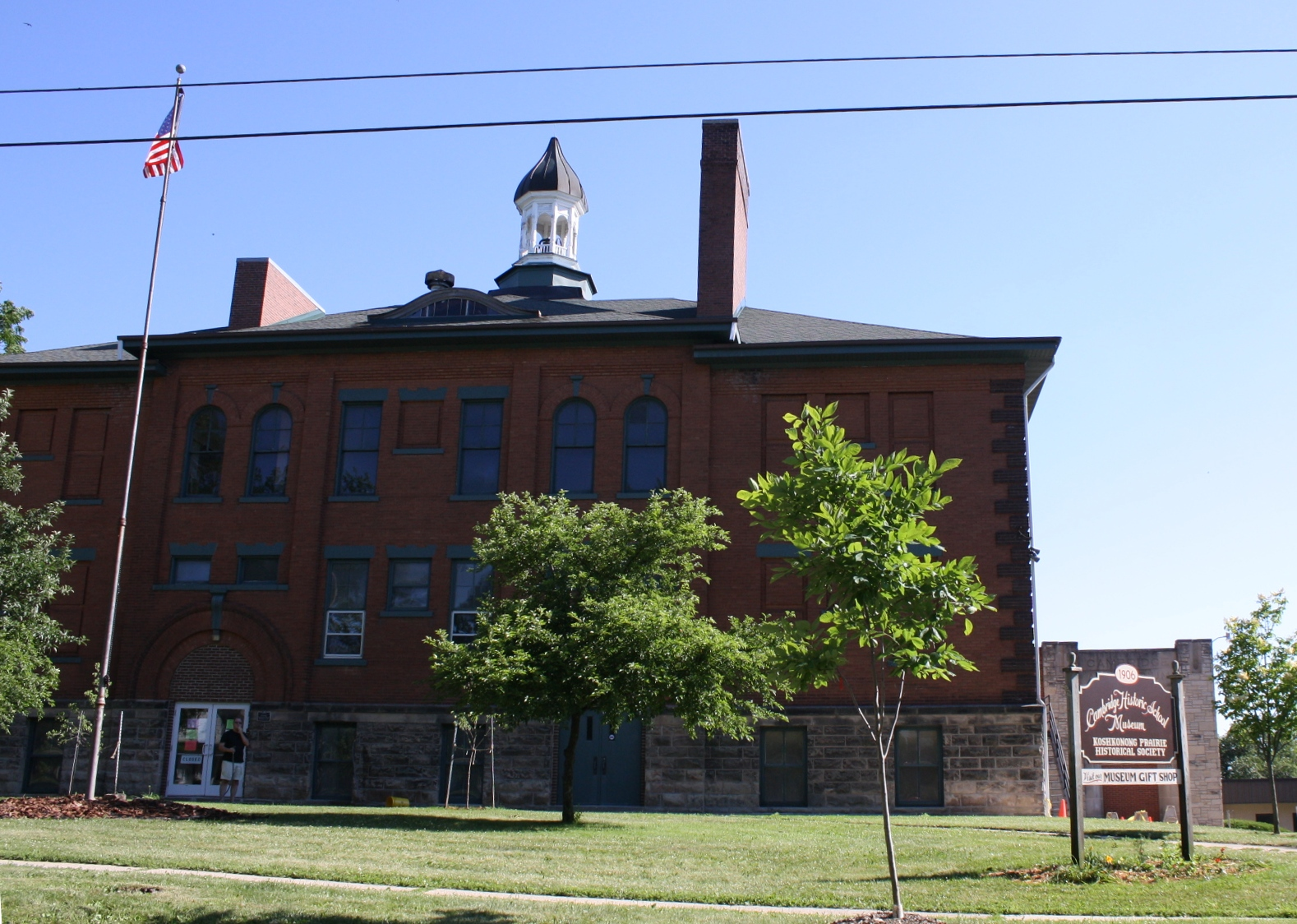
- Cambridge Public School and High School
- Location: 103 South St., Cambridge, Wisconsin
- Coordinates: 43°00′06″N 89°00′54″W
- Area: 2.7 acres (1.1 ha)
- Built: 1905-1906/1938-1939
- Architect: Parsons & Son/Alfred H. Siewert
- Architectural style: Colonial RevivalRomanesque
- NRHP reference No.: 98000708
- Added to NRHP: June 23, 1998

The Cambridge Public School and High School is a historic school building constructed in 1905 in Cambridge, Wisconsin.

Cambridge's early Yankee settlers valued education, and they constructed a school in 1848. It was a one-story wooden building, with its original location unknown. In 1869 it was replaced by a two-story wooden building on the site of the current school. In 1888 it was certified a three-year "free high school."

In 1905 the old school was destroyed by fire. The school district responded quickly, commissioning the Des Moines firm of W.R. Parsons and Son to design the new school. The Chippewa Falls Construction Company won the bid, construction began in August, and the school was complete in January 1906. This building is two stories, clad in red brick, with a hip-and-deck roof. The corners of the building are decorated with dark brick quoins. The style is Georgian Revival with Romanesque Revival accents evident in the round arches and rusticated stone of the basement level. The new school featured many modern amenities, including a forced-air furnace and a ventilation system. The first floor was for elementary classes, with each room having its own small library. High school was upstairs. Despite some amenities, the building probably did not start out with running water (no toilets), and would not be wired for electricity until 1909.

In 1938-39 the school building underwent significant renovations and a gymnasium and auditorium were added with support of a Public Works Administration grant. The addition was designed by Alfred H. Siewert of Milwaukee. His design used glued laminated wooden arches to support the gymnasium roof, which was rather state-of-the-art for the time.

Other sections were added on in 1956, 1962 and 1990.

In the years since, the schools have been split apart and moved to different locations and this building was converted to a museum. In 1998, the building was added to the State and the National Register of Historic Places.
