= John Webber =

English artist and explorer (1751–1793)

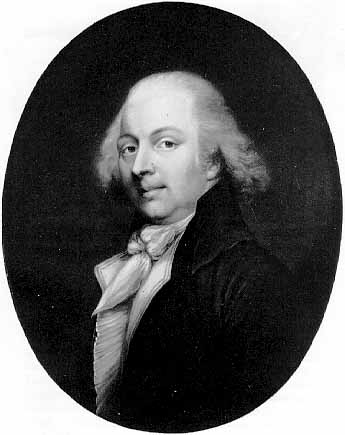
- Born: 6 October 1751; London, England
- Died: 29 May 1793 (aged 41); London, England
- Education: Paris, France
- Known for: Painting
- Notable work: "Resolution and Discovery in Ship Cove, 1778"; "A Party from H.M.S. Resolution shooting sea horses", Kealakekua Bay and the Village Kowroaa

John Webber RA (6 October 1751 – 29 May 1793) was an English artist who accompanied Captain Cook on his third Pacific expedition. He is best known for his images of Australasia, Hawaii and Alaska.

== Biography ==
Webber was born in London, educated in Bern and studied painting at Paris. His father was Abraham Wäber, a Swiss sculptor who had moved to London, and changed his name to Webber before marrying a Mrs Mary Quant in 1744.

Webber served as official artist on James Cook's third voyage of discovery around the Pacific (1776–1780) aboard HMS Resolution. On this voyage, during which Cook lost his life in a fight in Hawaii, Webber became the first European artist to make contact with Hawaii, then called the Sandwich Islands. He made numerous watercolour landscapes of the islands of Kauai and Hawaii, and also portrayed many of the Hawaiian people.

In April 1778, Captain Cook's ships Resolution and Discovery anchored at Ship Cove, in King George's Sound, now known as Nootka Sound, Vancouver Island, Canada to refit. The crew took observations and recorded encounters with the local people. Webber made watercolour landscapes including "Resolution and Discovery in Ship Cove, 1778". His drawings and paintings were engraved for the British Admiralty's account of the expedition, which was published in 1784.

== Collections ==
The Anchorage Museum of History and Art (Alaska), the Museum of the Aleutians (Alaska), the Bishop Museum (Honolulu), the Honolulu Museum of Art, the Peabody Essex Museum (Salem, Massachusetts), the Yale University Art Gallery, the British Museum, the Sir John Soane's Museum (London), The National Maritime Museum (London), the Museum of New Zealand Te Papa Tongarewa , the John Carter Brown Library, and the Mitchell Library (Australia) are among the public collections holding works by John Webber.

=== Australia ===
Webber's art is held by a number of Australian institutions including the National Portrait Gallery (William Bligh, c.1776, The Death of Captain Cook (engraving), 1784, and Portrait of Captain James Cook RN, 1782); the Australian National Maritime Museum (View of Huaheine, 1784); the Art Gallery of New South Wales (A View in Otaheite Peha, 1785); the National Library of Australia (includes Sea Otter, 1778, A Woman of Pulo Condore, 1780, Portrait of Captain John Gore, 1780, Poedua, Daughter of Orea, King of Ulietea, Society Islands, 1782, Portrait of Captain James King, 1782, A Dance in Otaheite, 1784, A Woman of Van Diemen's Land, 1784, A Chief of the Sandwich Islands, 1787, and The Resolution Beating Through the Ice, 1792,); the Dixson Library (includes An Opossum of Van Diemen's Land, 1777, Red-tailed Tropic Bird, 1777, and The Death of Captain Cook, c.1781–83.); and the National Gallery of Victoria (A Night Dance by Men, in Hapaee, 1784, A Young Woman of the Sandwich Islands, 1784, and A Man of Van Diemen's Land, 1784.).

== Works ==
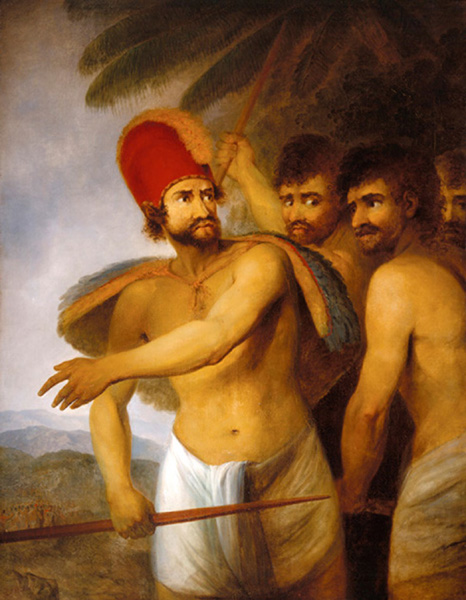
'A Chief of the Sandwich Islands' (oil), 1787, National Library of Australia

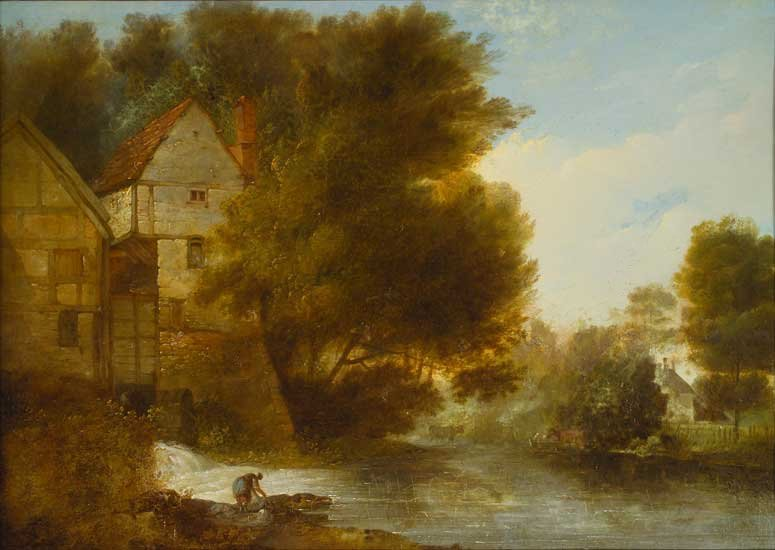
'Abbey Mill, Shrewsbury' (oil)

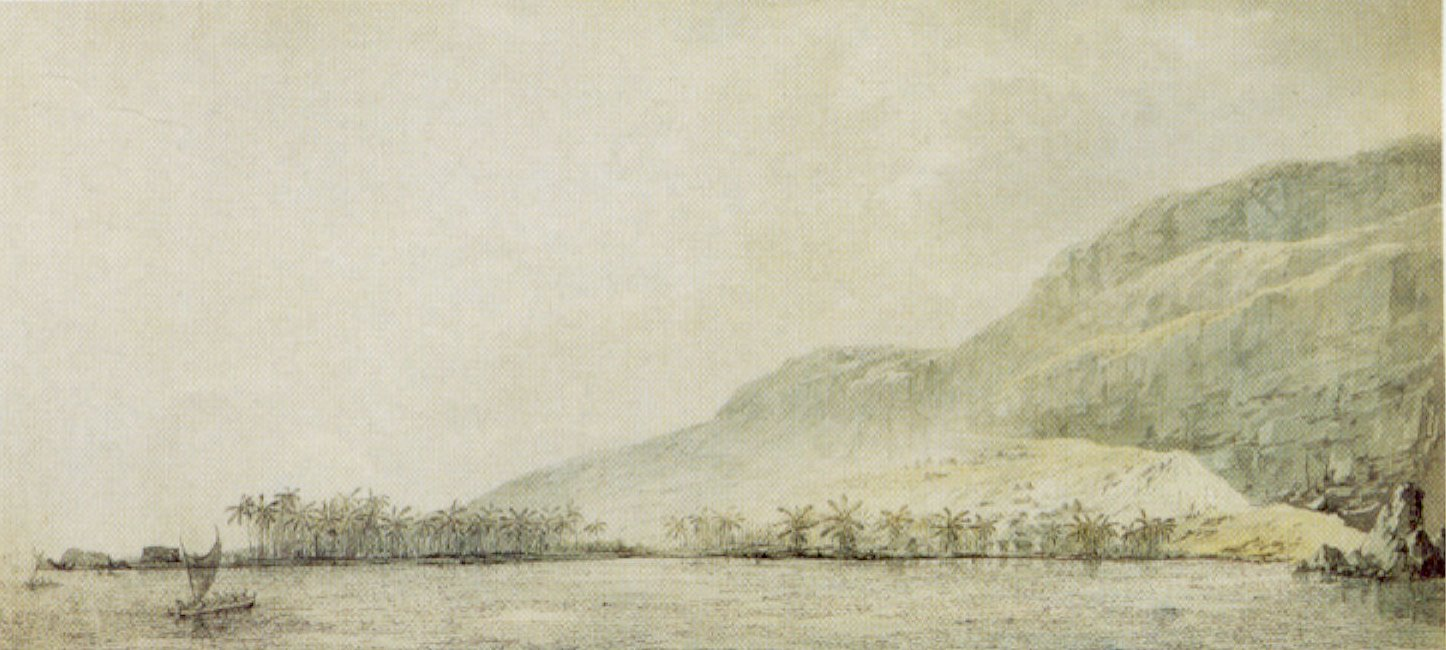
Kealakekua Bay and the Village Kowroaa, 1779 ink wash and watercolor by John Webber, Honolulu Museum of Art

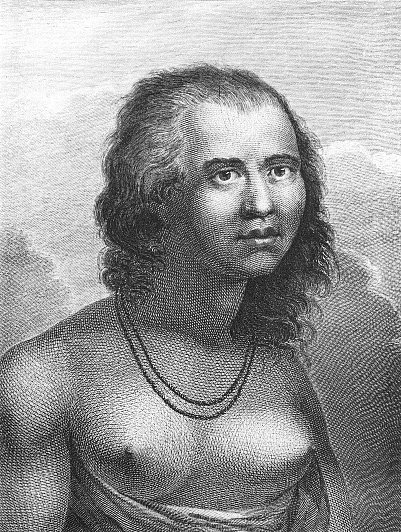
John Webber's woman from Eaoo

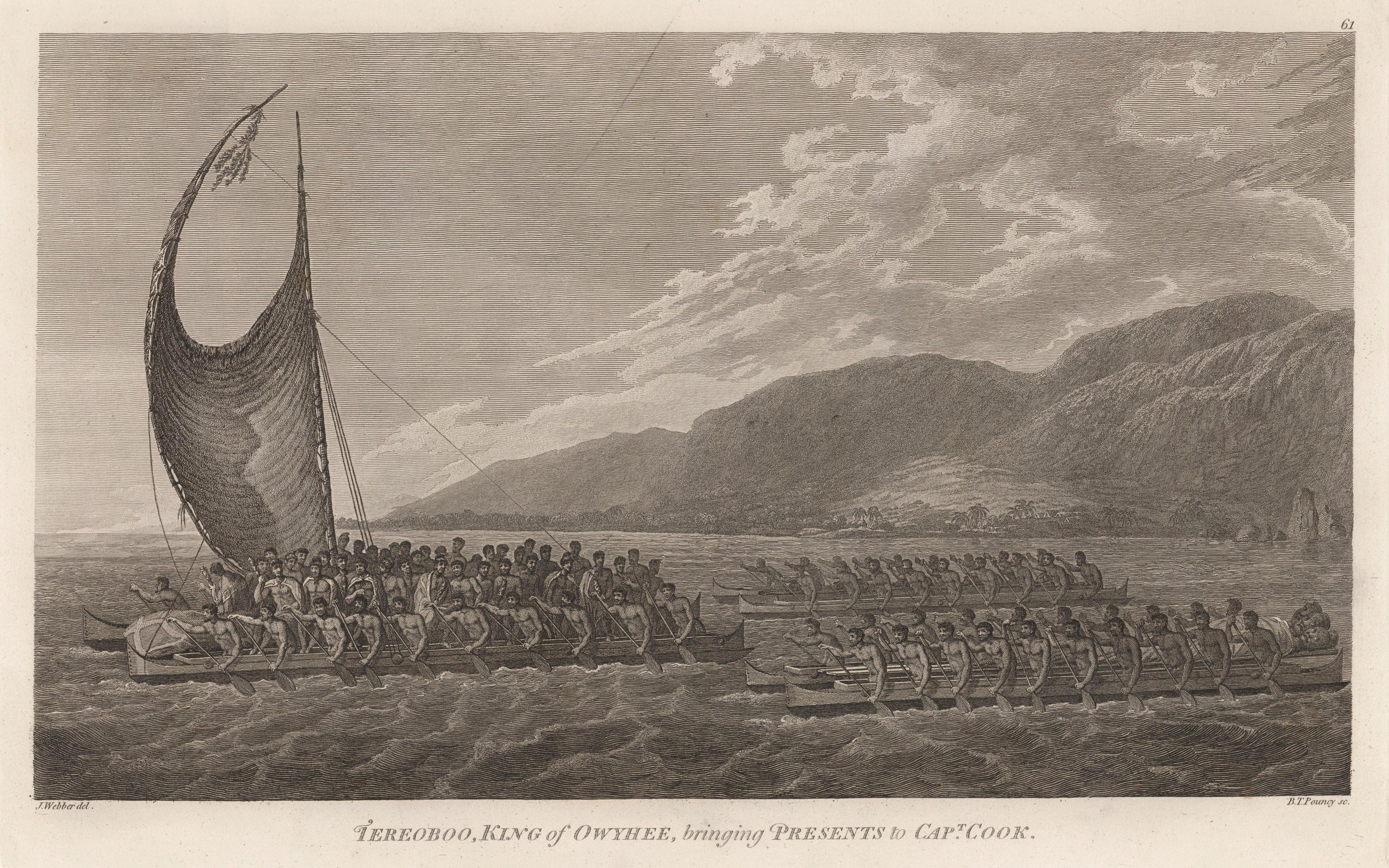
John Webber's Tereoboo, King of Owyhee, bringing presents to Captain Cook 1784

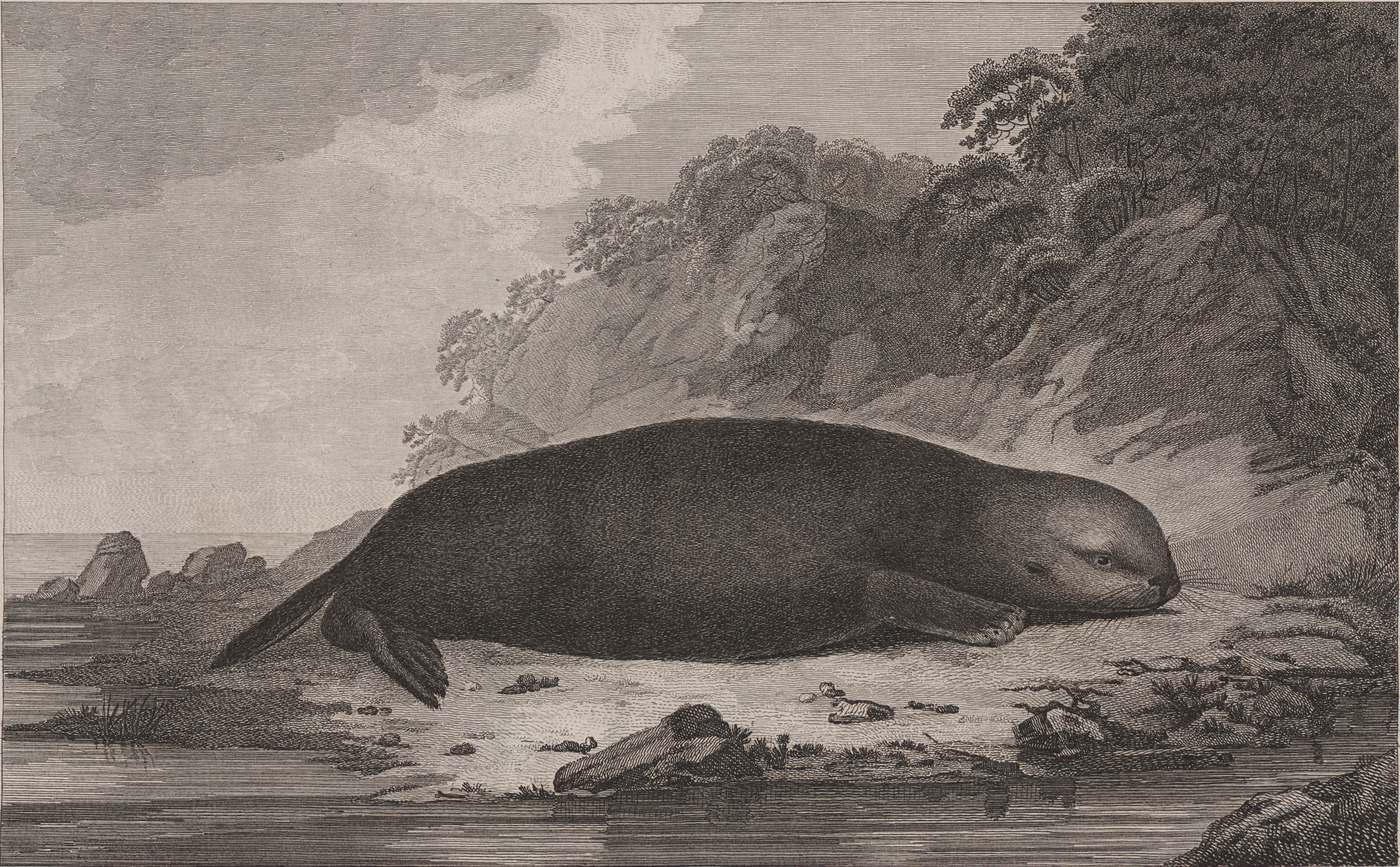
John Webber's Sea Otter

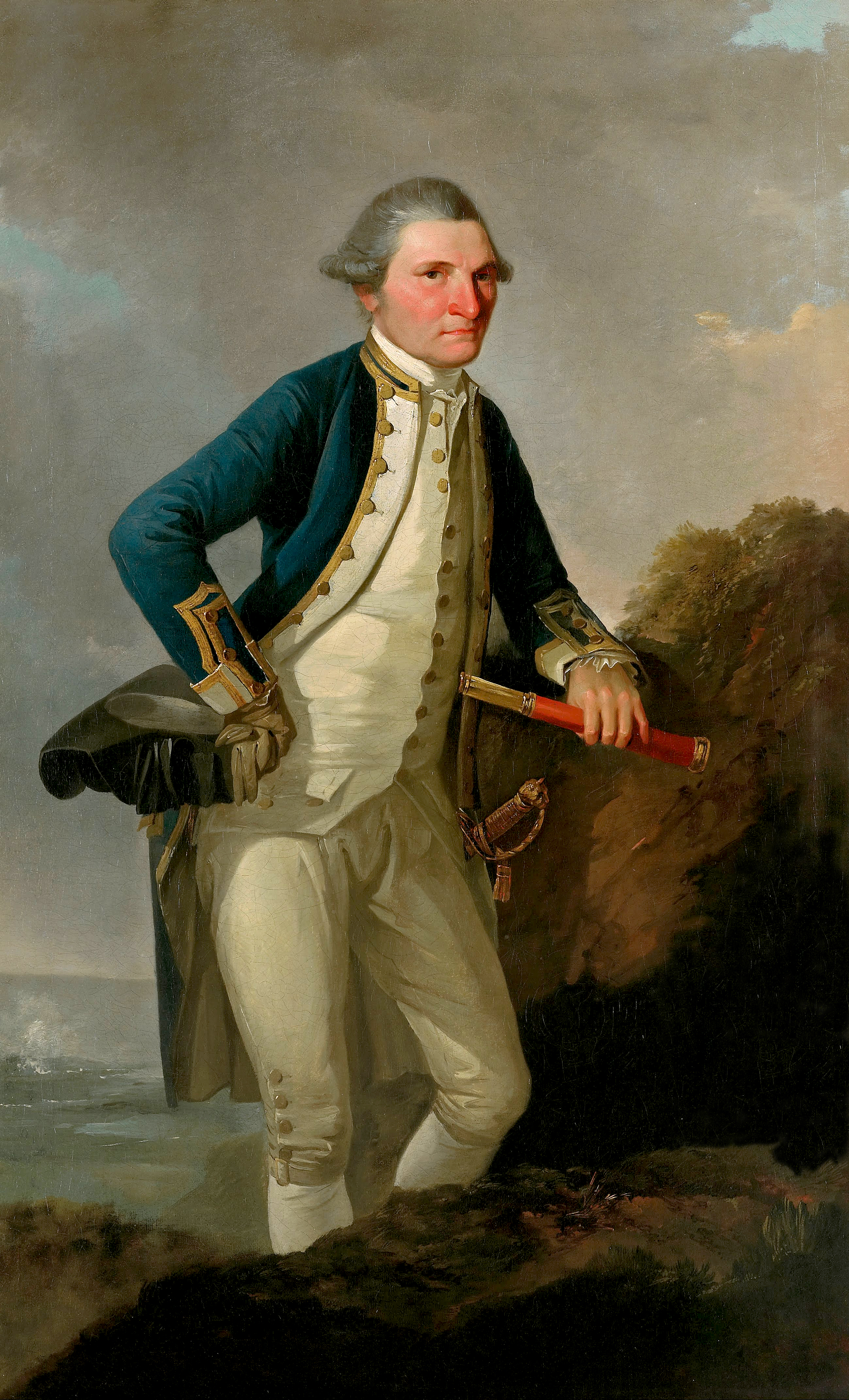
John Webber's Captain Cook, oil on canvas, 1776 Museum of New Zealand Te Papa Tongarewa, Wellington NZ

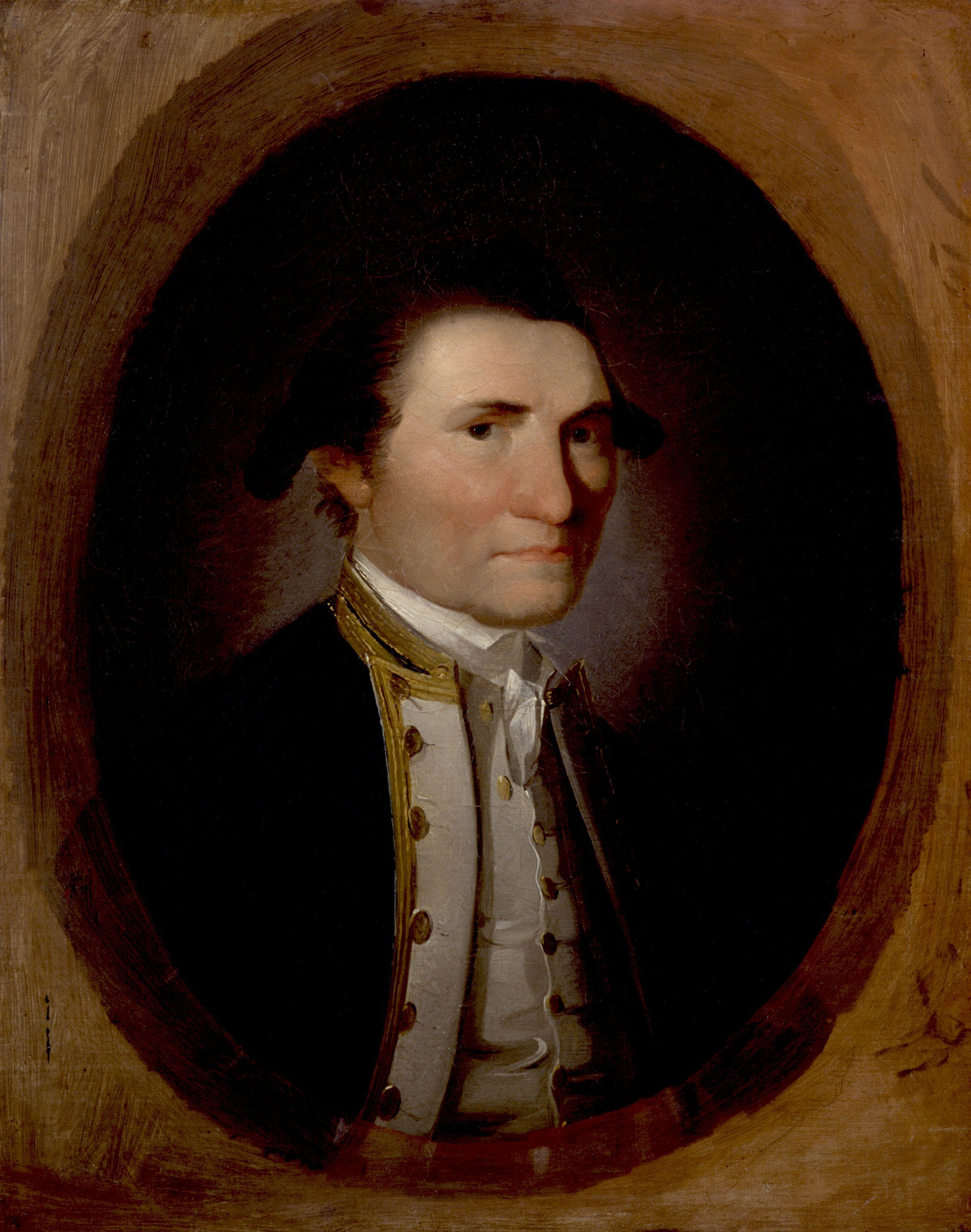
John Webber's James Cook, before 1793

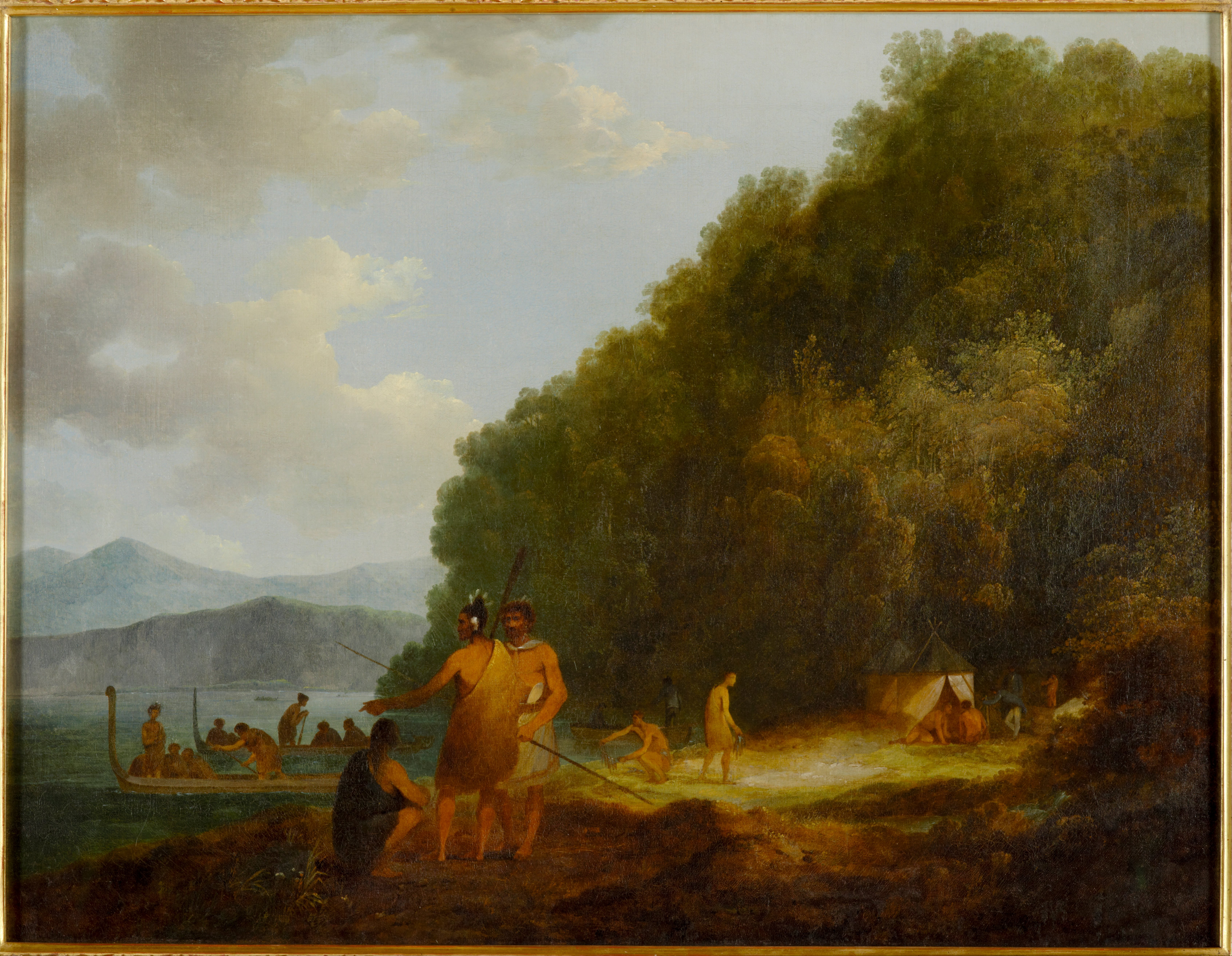
Ship Cove, Queen Charlotte Sound, 1788 Museum of New Zealand Te Papa Tongarewa

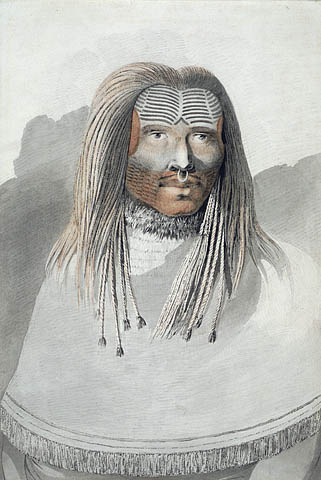
John Webber's Man of Nootka Sound

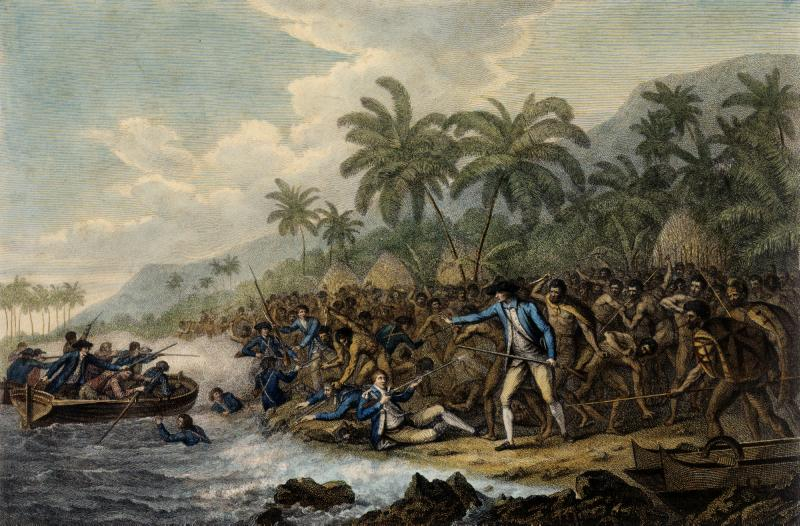
John Webber's 'The Death of Captain Cook'

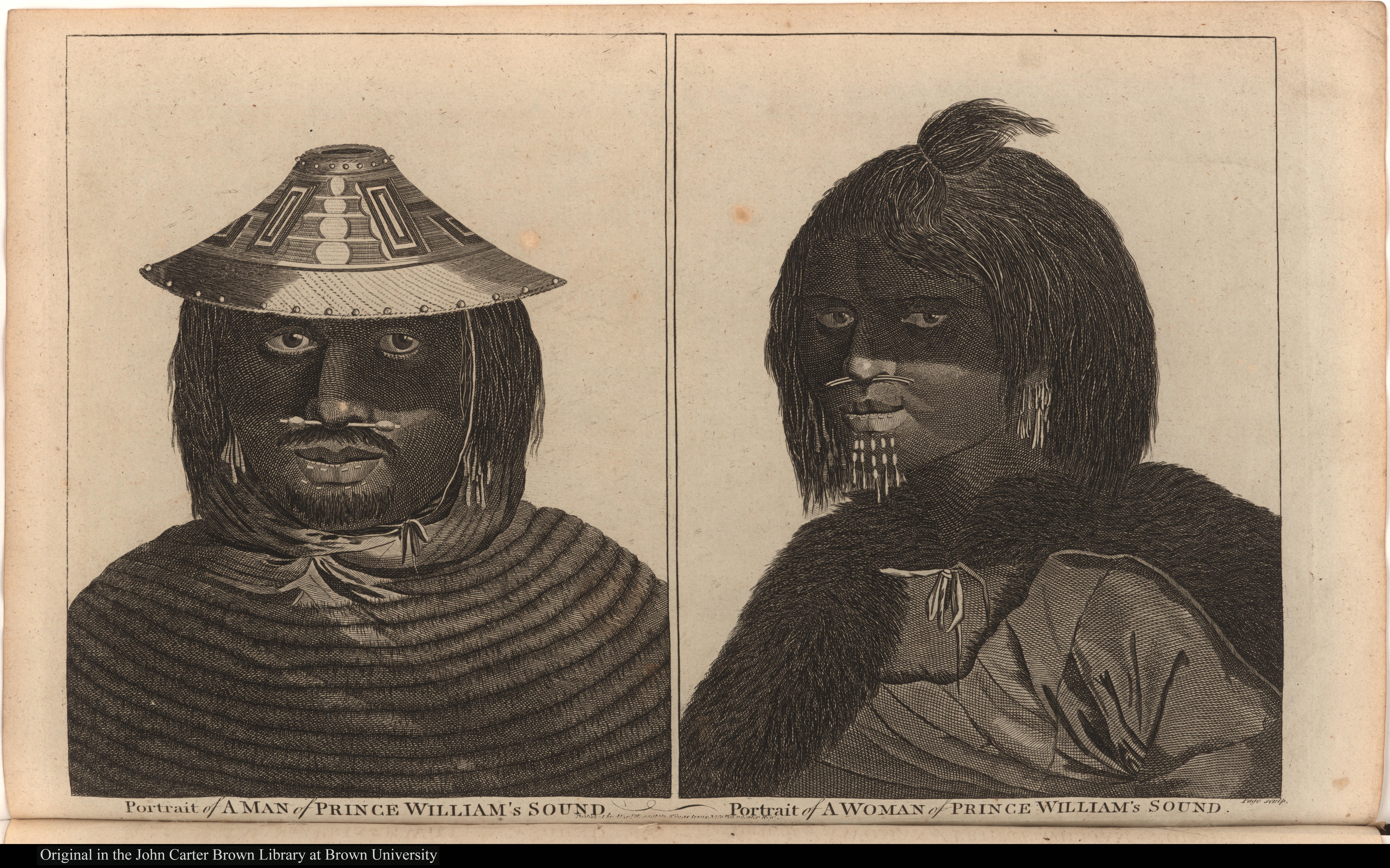

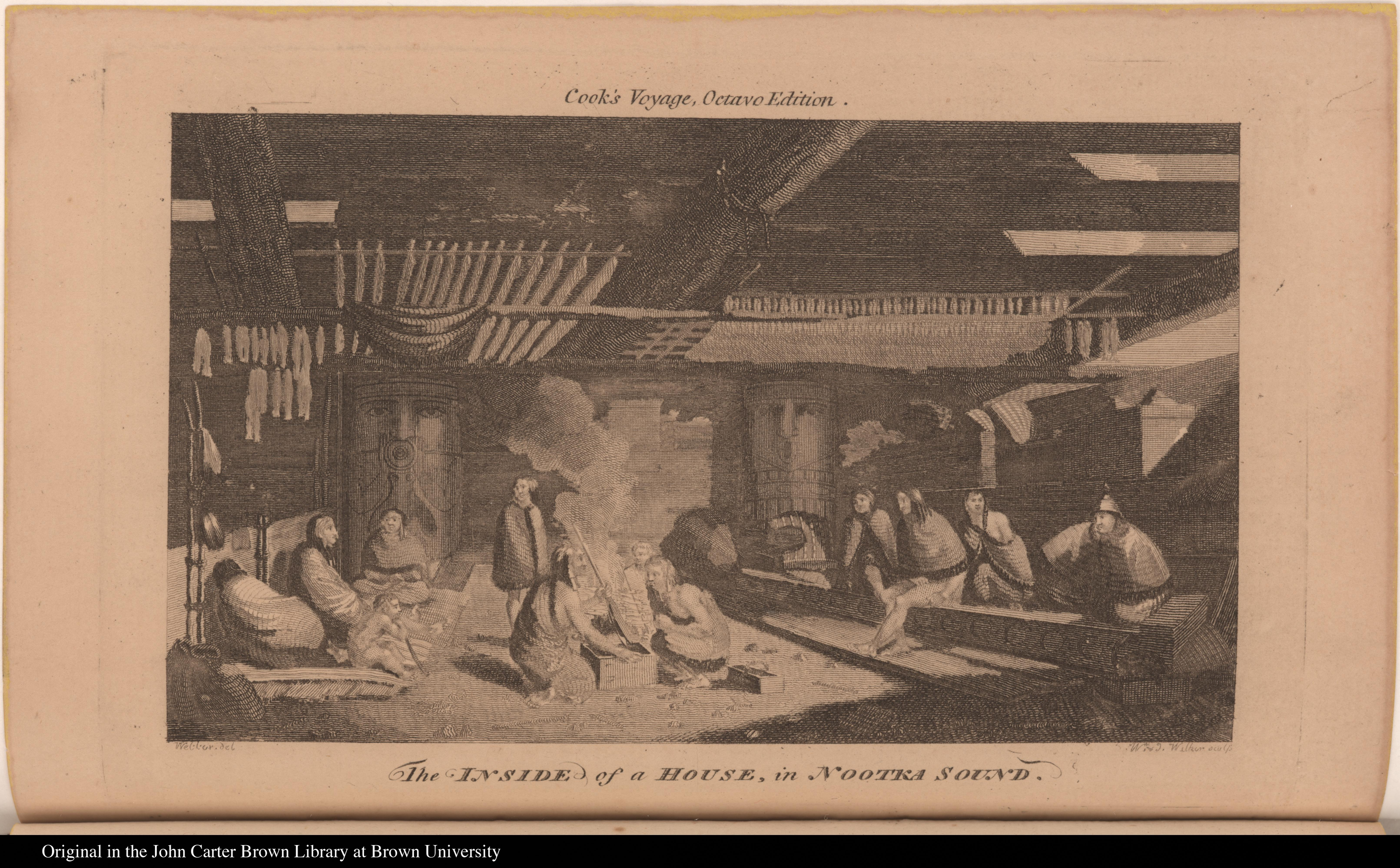

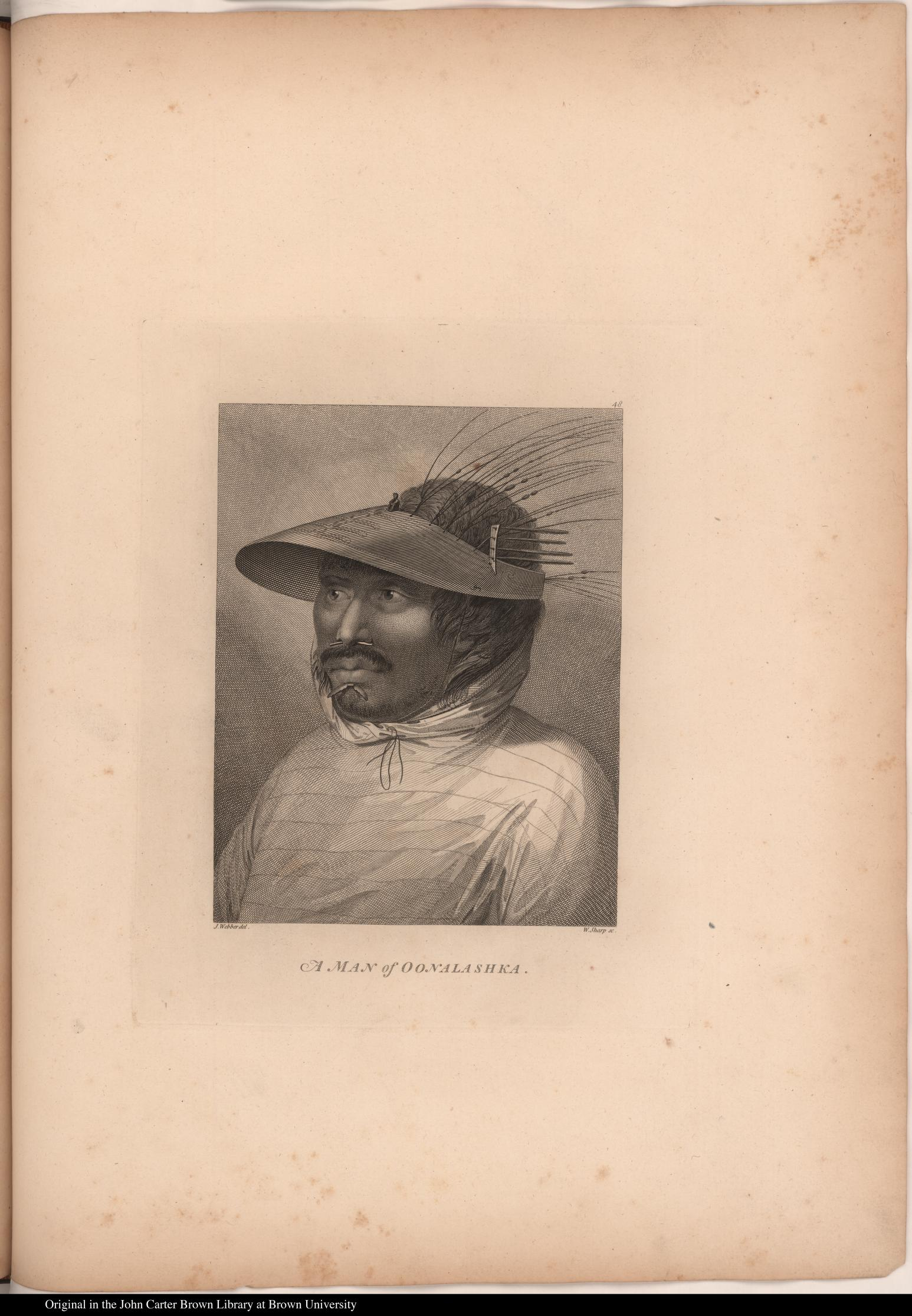

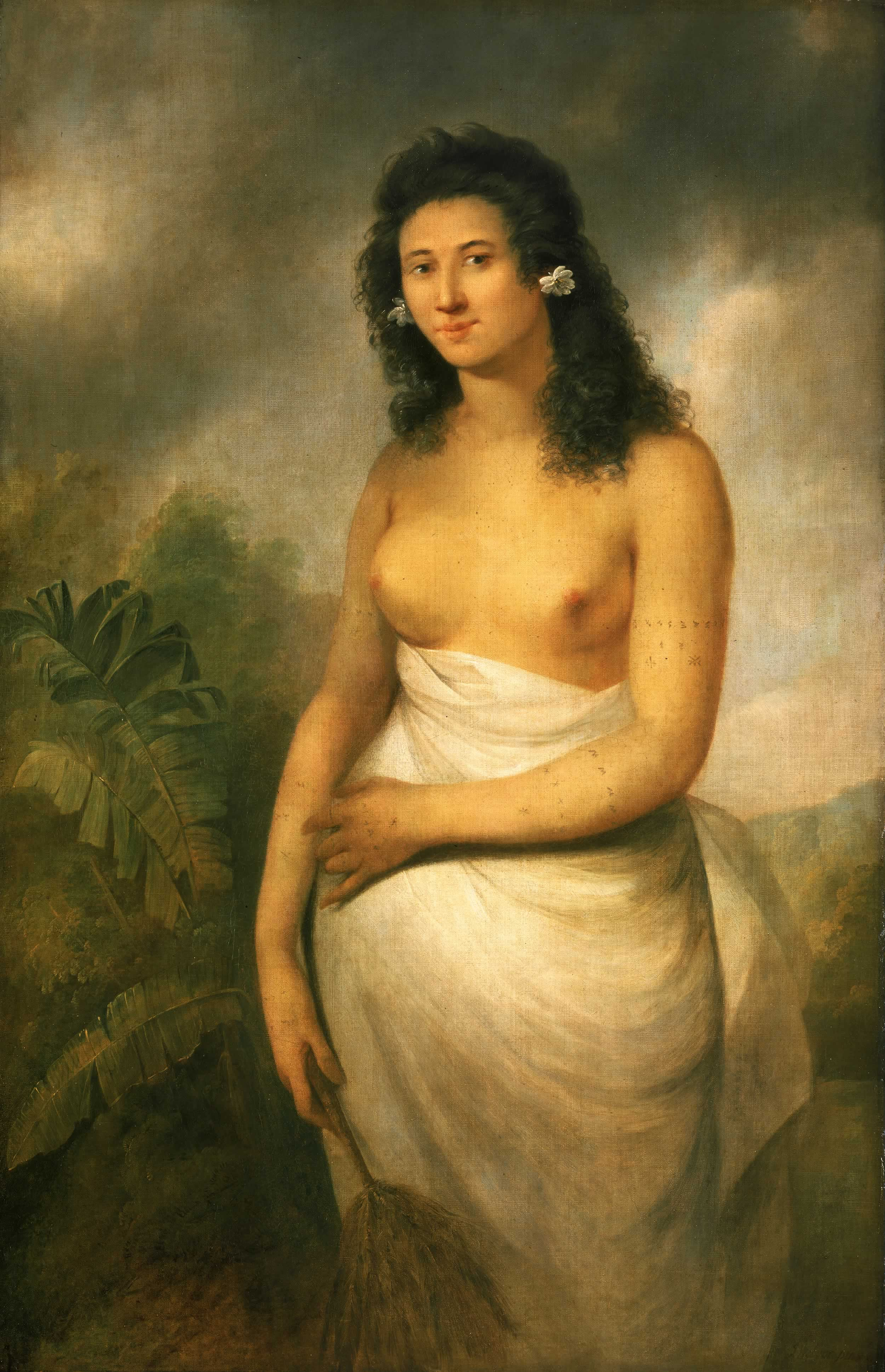
A Polynesian woman, painted in 1777 by John Webber

== See also ==
- European and American voyages of scientific exploration
