= Bartholomew Bouverie =

British politician

The Honourable Bartholemew Bouverie
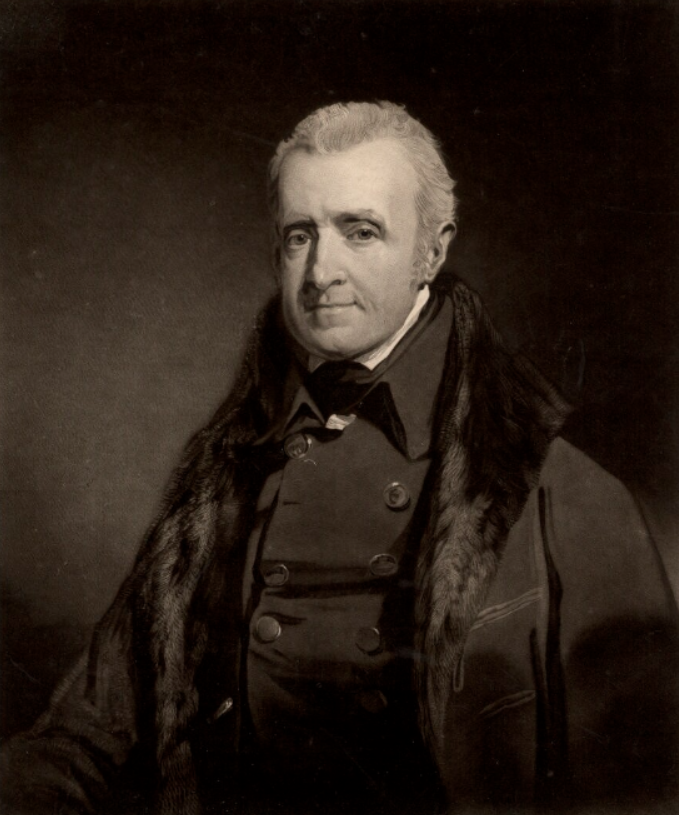

Member of Parliament for Downton
- In office 1826–1830 Serving with Alexander Powell
- Preceded by: Thomas Grimston Bucknall Estcourt; Robert Southey
- Succeeded by: James Brougham; Charles Shaw-Lefevre
- In office 1819–1826 Serving with Sir Thomas Brooke-Pechell, Bt
- Preceded by: Viscount Folkestone; Sir William Scott
- Succeeded by: Thomas Grimston Bucknall Estcourt; Robert Southey
- In office 1806–1812 Serving with Hon. Duncombe Pleydell-Bouverie, Sir Thomas Plumer
- Preceded by: The Lord de Blaquiere; Viscount Marsham
- Succeeded by: Sir Thomas Plumer; Charles Henry Bouverie
- In office 1790–1796 Serving with Sir William Scott
- Preceded by: Robert Shafto; Lord William Seymour-Conway
- Succeeded by: Sir William Scott; Hon. Edward Bouverie
- In office December 1779 – February 1780 Serving with Sir Philip Hales, Bt
- Preceded by: Sir Philip Hales, Bt; Thomas Duncombe
- Succeeded by: Sir Philip Hales, Bt; Robert Shafto

Personal details
- Born: 29 October 1753
- Died: 31 May 1835 (aged 81)
- Relations: Jacob Pleydell-Bouverie, 2nd Earl of Radnor (half-brother); William Henry Bouverie (brother); Sir John Alleyne, 1st Baronet (uncle)
- Parent(s): William Bouverie, 1st Earl of Radnor; Rebecca Alleyne
- Education: Harrow School
- Alma mater: University College, Oxford

Bartholemew Bouverie (29 October 1753 – 31 May 1835), was a British politician.

== Early life ==
Bouverie was the third son of William Bouverie, 1st Earl of Radnor, by his second wife Rebecca Alleyne, daughter of John Alleyne, of Four Hills, Barbados, and sister of Sir John Alleyne, 1st Baronet. He was the half-brother of Jacob Pleydell-Bouverie, 2nd Earl of Radnor, and the full brother of William Henry Bouverie and Edward Bouverie.

His paternal grandparents were Jacob Bouverie, 1st Viscount Folkestone and Mary Clarke (the daughter of Bartholomew Clarke, merchant of Hardingstone and Mary (née Young), sister and sole heir to Hitch Younge MP).

He was educated at Harrow in c. 1766 and University College, Oxford in 1772.

== Career ==
Bouverie was returned to Parliament for Downton in December 1779, but was unseated on petition already in February of the following year. He was once again returned for the constituency in 1790, and continued to represent it until 1796. From 1802 to 1806 he was a Commissioner for auditing public accounts.

The latter year he was returned for Downton for a third time, and now held the seat until 1812 and again between 1819 and June 1826, when he lost his seat. However, he was once again elected in December 1826, and continued to sit for the constituency until 1830. In 1829 he had been appointed a Metropolitan Commissioner for Lunacy, which he remained until his death. Bouverie was seldom active in the House of Commons and is not known to have ever spoken.

== Personal life ==
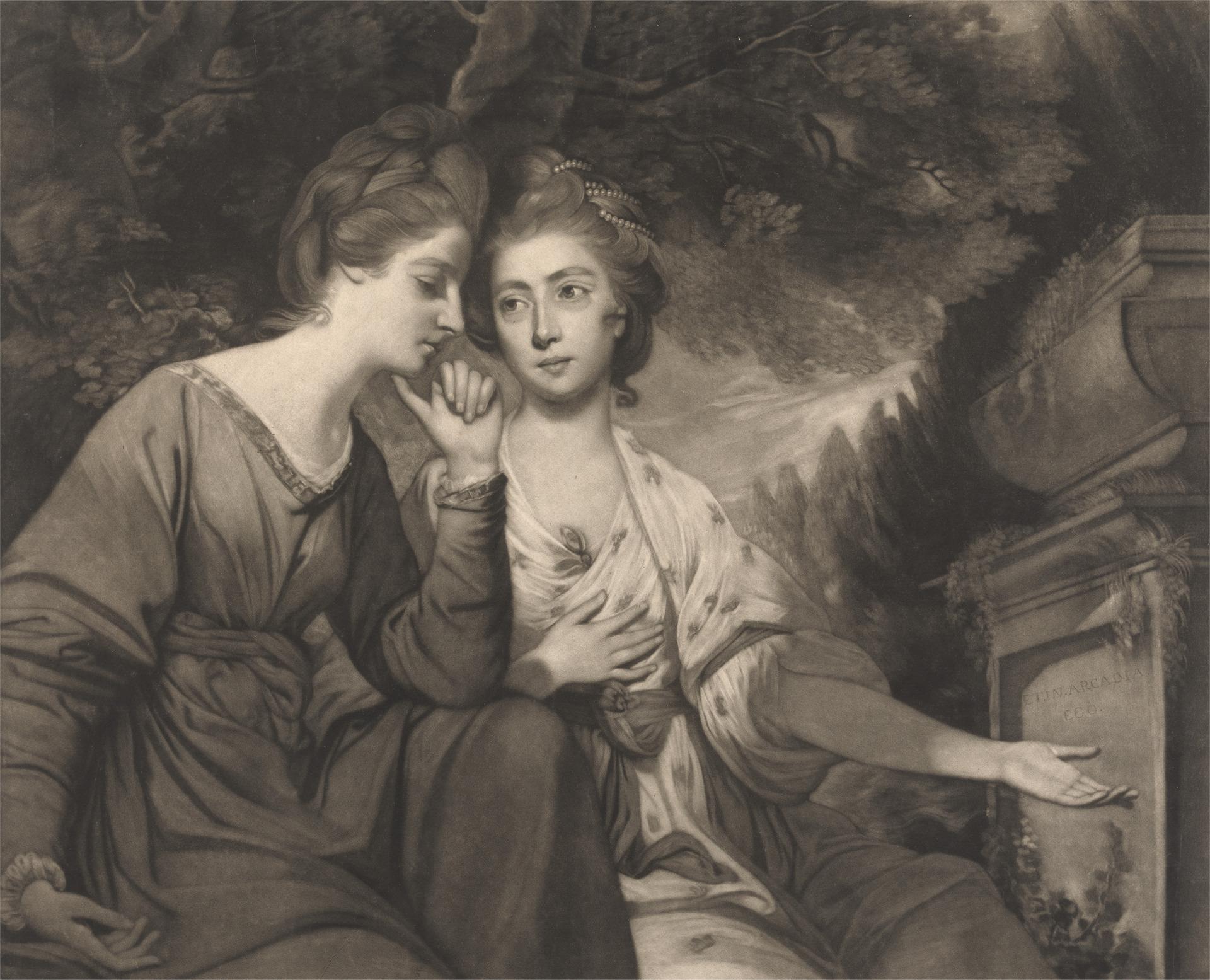
Mrs. Harriet Bouverie and Mrs. Frances Ann Crewe, by Giuseppe Filippo Liberati Marchi, 1770 (at the Yale Center for British Art)

On 9 March 1779, Bouverie married Mary Wyndham Arundell, daughter of the Hon. James Everard Arundell (a son of 8th Baron Arundell of Wardour) and Ann Wyndham. Together, they were the parents of:

- Henry James Bouverie (1781–1832), a Commissioner of Customs.
- Rev. Edward Bouverie (1782–1874), the Chaplain-in-Ordinary to Queen Victoria from 1820 and 1874; he married Lady Frances Courtenay, daughter of Rt. Rev. Henry Reginald Courtenay and Lady Elizabeth Howard (a daughter of 2nd Earl of Effingham), in 1811.
- The Ven. William Arundell Bouverie (1797–1877), the Archdeacon of Norfolk; he married Hon. Frances "Fanny" Sneyd, daughter of Walter Sneyd and Hon. Louisa Bagot (daughter of the 1st Baron Bagot), in 1831.
- Charlotte Bouverie (d. 1810), who married Sir Henry St John-Mildmay, 4th Baronet, MP for Winchester who was the eldest son of Sir Henry St John-Mildmay, 3rd Baronet.
- Harriet Bouverie (d. 1834), who married Archibald Primrose, 4th Earl of Rosebery, (grandparents of Archibald Primrose, 5th Earl of Rosebery, Prime Minister of the United Kingdom); she caused a society scandal when she had an affair with her brother-in-law Sir Henry St John-Mildmay, 4th Baronet (the widower of her deceased sister Charlotte). She obtained a divorce from Rosebery and married St John-Mildmay in Stuttgart after obtaining a special permission by the King of Württemberg.
- Anna Maria Wyndham Bouverie (d. 1864), who married Paulet St John-Mildmay, brother of Sir Henry St John-Mildmay, 4th Baronet.

His wife died in February 1832. Bouverie survived her by three years and died in May 1835, aged 81.

Parliament of Great Britain
Preceded by Sir Philip Hales, Bt; Thomas Duncombe	Member of Parliament for Downton; December 1779 – February 1780; With: Sir Philip Hales, Bt	Succeeded by Sir Philip Hales, Bt; Robert Shafto
Preceded by Robert Shafto; Lord William Seymour-Conway	Member of Parliament for Downton; 1790–1796; With: Sir William Scott	Succeeded by Sir William Scott; Hon. Edward Bouverie
Parliament of the United Kingdom
Preceded by The Lord de Blaquiere; Viscount Marsham	Member of Parliament for Downton; 1806–1812; With: Hon. Duncombe Pleydell-Bouverie 1806–1807; Sir Thomas Plumer 1807–1812	Succeeded by Sir Thomas Plumer; Charles Henry Bouverie
Preceded by Viscount Folkestone; Sir William Scott	Member of Parliament for Downton; 1819–June 1826; With: Sir Thomas Brooke-Pechell, Bt	Succeeded by Thomas Grimston Bucknall Estcourt; Robert Southey
Preceded by Thomas Grimston Bucknall Estcourt; Robert Southey	Member of Parliament for Downton; December 1826–1830; With: Alexander Powell	Succeeded by James Brougham; Charles Shaw-Lefevre
