= Sir Joseph Ashe, 1st Baronet =

English politician and clothier (1617–1686)

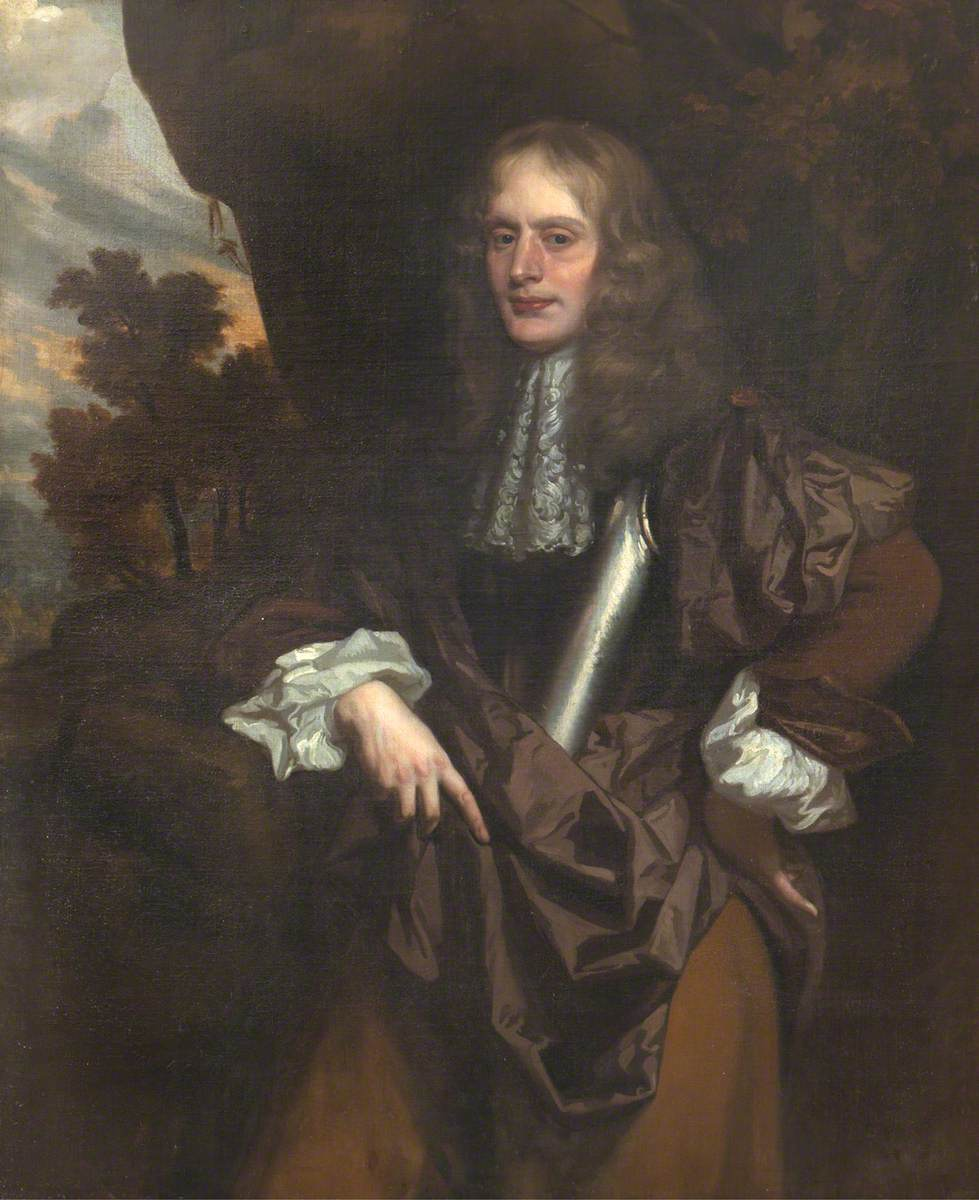
- Portrait by Peter Lely in the 1660s

Member of Parliament for Downton
- In office 15 December 1670 – 1685
- Monarch: Charles II

Personal details
- Born: 16 February 1617
- Died: 15 April 1686 (aged 69)
- Children: Sir James Ashe, 2nd Baronet

Sir Joseph Ashe, 1st Baronet (16 February 1617 – 15 April 1686) was an English Whig politician and merchant.

He was born into a rising and prominent family of clothiers in Somerset, the third surviving son of James Ashe of Westcombe, and his wife Grace Pitt, daughter of Richard Pitt of Melcombe Regis, Dorset. Educated in London at the Merchant Taylors school, Joseph spent the 1640s as a merchant in Antwerp with his business associate John Shaw. On his return he married Mary Wilson, the daughter of a London Draper, later raising with her seven daughters and two sons.

During the Civil War, his elder brothers in Parliament John and Edward Ashe both served on the committee responsible for confiscating Royalist estates, of which John was the chairman. Joseph himself was arrested on suspicion of corresponding with the enemy, and may have been involved with John Shaw in transferring funds to Charles II's court in exile. Nonetheless, he succeeded in avoiding further punishment, and during the final years of the Protectorate government, purchased the estate of Twickenham Meadows in the county of Middlesex, now known as Cambridge Park, where his family would remain for nearly a century. After the monarchy was restored, Joseph was called as a juryman in the regicide trials, where he was unsuccessfully challenged by the defence. On 19 September 1660, he was made a baronet of Twickenham for his earlier assistance to the Crown.

His career in Parliament began in 1661 when he ran for Heytesbury during the minority of his cousin William Ashe, and lost. He would return in 1670, successfully winning for the constituency of Downton, where he had leased a manor from the bishop of Winchester. His tenure lasted until 1685.

In addition to his estate in Twickenham, Sir Joseph also bought and refurbished property in other places such as Wawne in Yorkshire, rarely inhabiting houses that he built up and owned as investment. In 1673, he founded in Downton a grammar school for twelve boys, called Burgh Manor. While probably disapproving of the East India Company early in his parliamentary career, he later became one of its largest investors, with his widow and trustees holding in it a total of £10,000 of stock at the time of the Glorious Revolution.

Sir Joseph is reported to have died "very rich" on 15 April 1686, and was buried at Twickenham Church, recognized as a "great benefactor" of the parish. His surviving son James succeeded him in his baronetcy at 12 years old, later serving in Parliament for Downton from 1701 to 1705. His two daughters were bequeathed £7,000 each and his sons-in-law, William Windham and Sir Horatio Townshend, each received £100 in mourning.

Parliament of England
Preceded by Gilbert Raleigh; Walter Bockland	Member of Parliament for Downton; 1670–1681; With: Gilbert Raleigh 1670–1675; Henry Eyre 1675–1678; Maurice Bocland 1678–1681	Succeeded by Maurice Bocland; Sir Charles Raleigh
Baronetage of England
New creation	Baronet (of Twickenham); 1660–1686	Succeeded by James Ashe
