= John Eyre (1665–1715) =

English lawyer and Whig politician

John Eyre (12 April 1665 – 2 November 1715) of Brickworth, Wiltshire was an English lawyer and Whig politician who sat in the English and British House of Commons from between 1698 and 1715.

Eyre was the son of Sir Giles Eyre of Brickworth House and his wife Dorothy Ryves. He matriculated at Merton College, Oxford on 10 February 1682, and also entered Lincoln's Inn on 31 May 1682. He married Mary Williams of St. James in the Fields by licence dated 18 June 1687, and was called to the bar in 1688. His father, whose estate had considerable electoral influence, died in June 1695.

Eyre returned himself unopposed on the family interest as Member of Parliament for Downton at a by election on 23 May 1698 and then at the 1698 English general election. He was a Whig and initially a Country Whig. He was elected in a contest at Downton in the first general election of 1701 but in the second general election of the year stood down in favour of Sir James Ashe, 2nd Bt. After Eyre stood aside again in 1702, Ashe returned the favour at the 1705 English general election when Eyre was returned unopposed. He voted for the Court candidate for Speaker on 25 October 1705, and for the Court in the proceedings on the 'place clause' of the regency bill on 18 February 1706. He was returned unopposed in the 1708 British general election and voted for the naturalization of the Palatines in 1709 and for the impeachment of Dr Sacheverell in 1710. He was relatively inactive in Parliament after the 1710 British general election but voted against the French commerce bill on 18 June 1713. He was returned again for Downton at the 1713 British general election and voted against the expulsion of Richard Steele on 18 March 1714. He was returned again at the 1715 British general election.

Eyre was an active lawyer throughout his life. He became a bencher of Lincoln's Inn in 1715, and died there on 2 November 1715 at the age of 50. He left all his real estates to his nephew Giles Eyre.

Parliament of England
Preceded by Maurice Bocland; Sir Charles Raleigh	Member of Parliament for Downton; 1698–1701; With: Maurice Bocland 1698; Carew Raleigh 1698-1701	Succeeded by Carew Raleigh; Sir James Ashe, 2nd Bt
Preceded by Sir Charles Duncombe; Sir James Ashe, 2nd Bt	Member of Parliament for Downton; 1705–1708; With: Sir Charles Duncombe	Succeeded by Parliament of Great Britain
Parliament of Great Britain
Preceded by Parliament of England	Member of Parliament for Downton; 1708–1715; With: Sir Charles Duncombe 1708-1711; Thomas Duncombe 1711-1713; John Sawyer 1713-1715; Charles Longueville 1715	Succeeded by Charles Longueville; Giles Eyre
