= Whiteparish =

Village in Wiltshire, England

Coordinates: 51.011°N 1.651°W

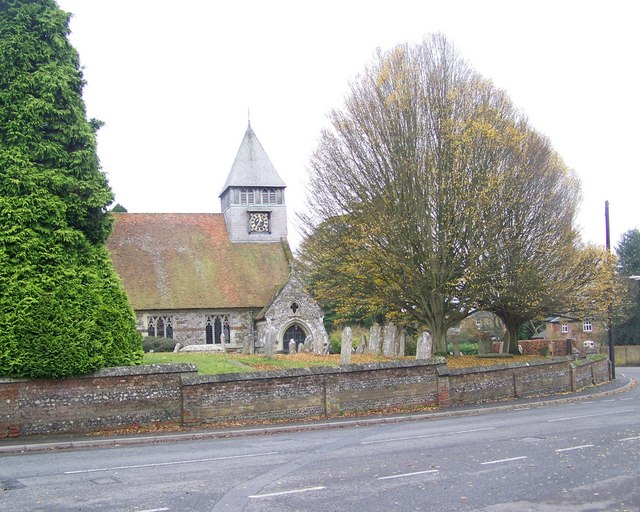
- All Saints Church, Whiteparish

- Location within Wiltshire
- Population: 1,504 (in 2011)
- OS grid reference: SU246236
- Civil parish: Whiteparish
- Unitary authority: Wiltshire
- Ceremonial county: Wiltshire
- Region: South West
- Country: England
- Sovereign state: United Kingdom
- Post town: Salisbury
- Postcode district: SP5
- Dialling code: 01794
- Police: Wiltshire
- Fire: Dorset and Wiltshire
- Ambulance: South Western
- UK Parliament: Salisbury
- Website: Parish Council

Whiteparish is a village and civil parish on the A27 about 7.5 miles (12.1 km) southeast of Salisbury in Wiltshire, England.

The village is about 1.5 miles (2.4 km) from the county boundary with Hampshire. The parish includes the hamlets of Cowesfield Green (east of Whiteparish on the A27) and Newton (southwest, near the A36).

== History ==
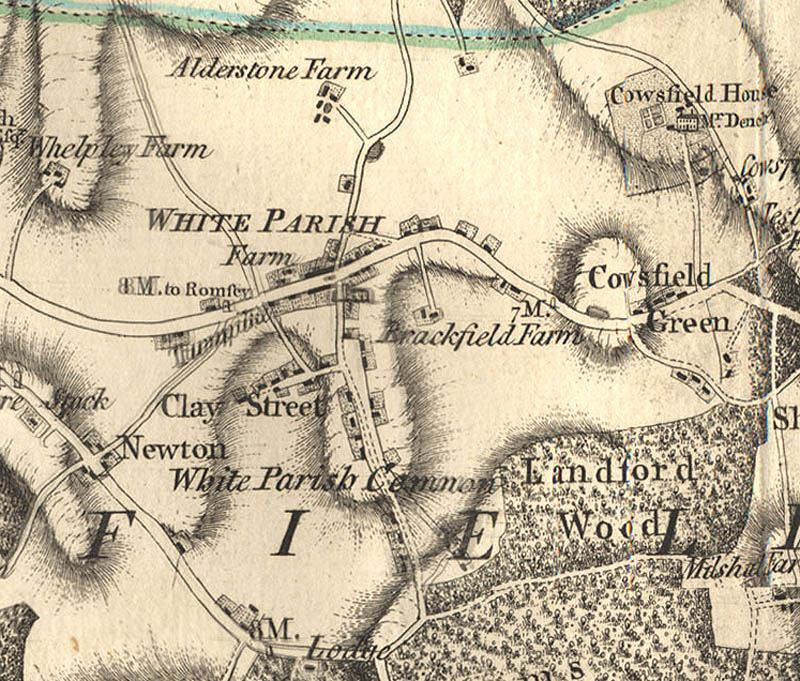
1773 map of Whiteparish

In the year 1278 the village was recorded as 'la Whytechyrche'. In 1291 the name 'Album Monasterium' (White Monastery/Religious Building) was seen, maybe referring to a church in light-coloured or whitewashed stone. The English name 'Whiteparish' was first seen in 1319.

The 1086 Domesday Book included the village of Frustfield (which became Whiteparish), together with nearby settlements at Alderstone (now extinct) and Cowesfield.

== Local government ==
The civil parish elects a parish council. It is in the area of Wiltshire Council unitary authority, which is responsible for all significant local government functions.

The parish falls in 'Alderbury and Whiteparish' electoral ward. The ward starts in the northwest at Alderbury and stretches south east to Whiteparish. The ward population taken at the 2011 census was 4,261.

== Schools ==
Whiteparish All Saints Church of England Primary School teaches children from a nursery class up to year 6. In the middle of the village, it has about 150 children, some from outside the village. A school for teaching reading, writing, and accounts to twenty poor children had been founded at Whiteparish by the gift of J. Lynch in 1639. In 1833 this school was teaching thirty-five boys. There was also a girls' school, founded in 1722 by the Will of E. Hitchcock, which in 1833 was teaching twenty girls the Church catechism, reading, and needlework. From 1842 there was a National School on the site of the present school, which educated children of all ages until 1955.

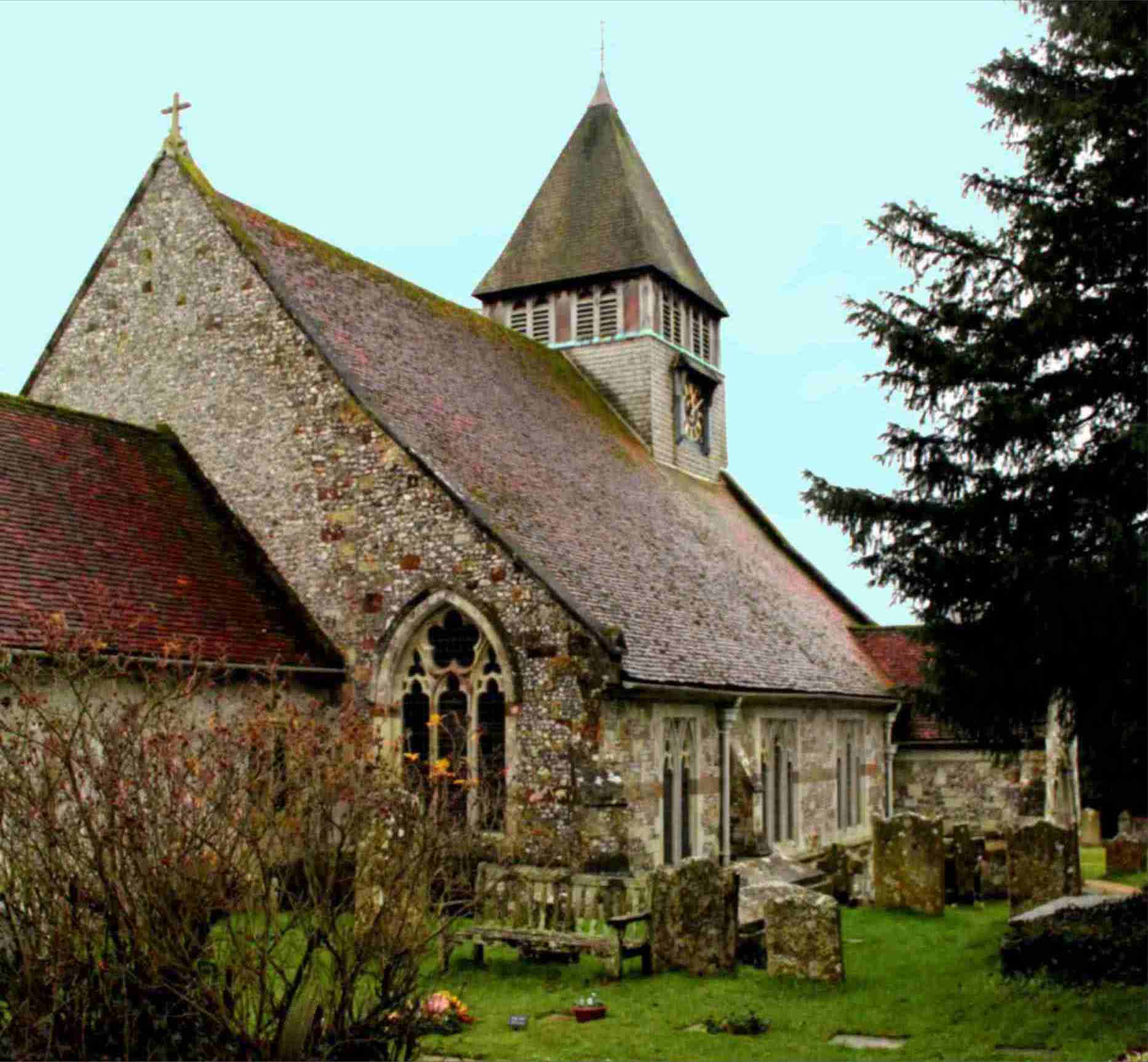
Whiteparish church from the east

== Churches ==
The Church of England parish church of All Saints is a Grade II* listed building in limestone and flint under a steep tiled roof, with a low shingled west bell-turret.

The church has late 12th-century origins, visible in details of the north and south arcades (rebuilt in the 15th century); a priest's doorway in the chancel may be of the same period. The chancel has a three-light 14th-century window. Restoration in 1870 by William Butterfield left the building entirely Victorian in external appearance.

A polygonal vestry added in 1969, in stone with flint panels, conceals the early priest's door. Monuments in the church include a tablet to Giles Eyre of Brickworth House (d.1655). A painting St Peter denying Christ is by J F Rigaud (d.1810). The tower has three bells, all from the 17th century, and a clock.

Today the church is one of ten covered by the Clarendon team ministry.

A Methodist church was built on Dean Lane in the 19th century. It was sold for residential use circa 2012.

== Amenities ==
Facilities in the village include:

- Whiteparish Memorial Centre, in the south-east corner of the recreation grounds (opened in 2014, replacing the former Village Hall on Romsey Road)
- All Saints CE Primary School, Common Road
- The Parish Lantern, a public house on Romsey Road
- The Kings Head, a gastropub on The Street
- Whiteparish Post Office & Village Stores, a community-run shop and post office
- Recreation grounds – containing a football pitch, cricket pitch, tennis courts, children's play area and multi-use games area
- Skateboard and rollerblading area, on the east side of the recreation grounds

The village previously had four public houses, but two have now closed. The first to close was the White Hart, around 1990. The site was developed into four houses in 2006, although the pub sign still exists on the opposite side of Romsey Road at the entrance to the recreation grounds. The Fountain Inn closed in 2015 and was converted to a residential property in 2016.

== Sites of Special Scientific Interest ==
The parish has two biological Sites of Special Scientific Interest: Whiteparish Common and Brickworth Down and Dean Hill.

== Notable buildings ==
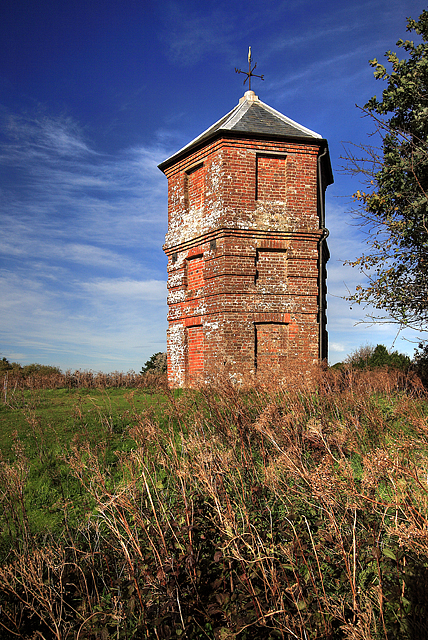
The Pepperbox in 2008

Abbotstone House is a Grade II listed building, adjacent to the A27, in the northwestern part of the village. Brickworth House was long the seat of the Eyres; in 1821 it passed by marriage to Thomas Nelson, 2nd Earl Nelson. Broxmore House and Cowesfield House were demolished in the late 1940s.

The Pepperbox, on a hill in the northwest corner of the parish, is a three-storey hexagonal brick tower from the early 18th century or perhaps 1606. Possibly built as a hunting lookout, the ground floor arches and the windows were at some point bricked up; the tower and hillside are now owned by the National Trust.

== Notable people ==
Lieutenant General Sir Archibald Nye (1895–1967), senior Army officer in both world wars and later High Commissioner in India and Canada, retired with his wife Una to Alderstone House.

=== The Eyre family ===
Several members of the Eyre family, of Brickworth and later of Newhouse in the adjacent parish, were prominent lawyers, judges or Members of Parliament.

- Giles Eyre (d. 1655), of Redlynch, bought land in Whiteparish in 1604 and built Brockworth House there. In 1633 he bought the Newhouse estate (then in Whiteparish, later part of Downton parish and since 1896 in Redlynch), including the mansion which had been built c.1619. The Newhouse estate has remained since then in the same family. All Saints' Church has a tablet memorial to him.
- His son Giles Eyre (1635–1695) "of Brickworth" was a lawyer and MP, as was his son John (1665–1715) "of Lincoln's Inn and Brickworth".
- Another son, Henry (1628–1678), was a lawyer and MP.
- Sir Samuel Eyre (1633–1698) "of New House" was a judge of the King's Bench; his son Robert (1666–1735) was a judge of the Queen's Bench and MP; and in turn his son Robert (c.1693–1752) was Recorder and MP. Another of Samuel's sons, Kingsmill (1682–1743), was Secretary of Chelsea Hospital.
- Giles Eyre (1692–1750) "of Brickworth" was a lawyer and MP.

== Gallery ==
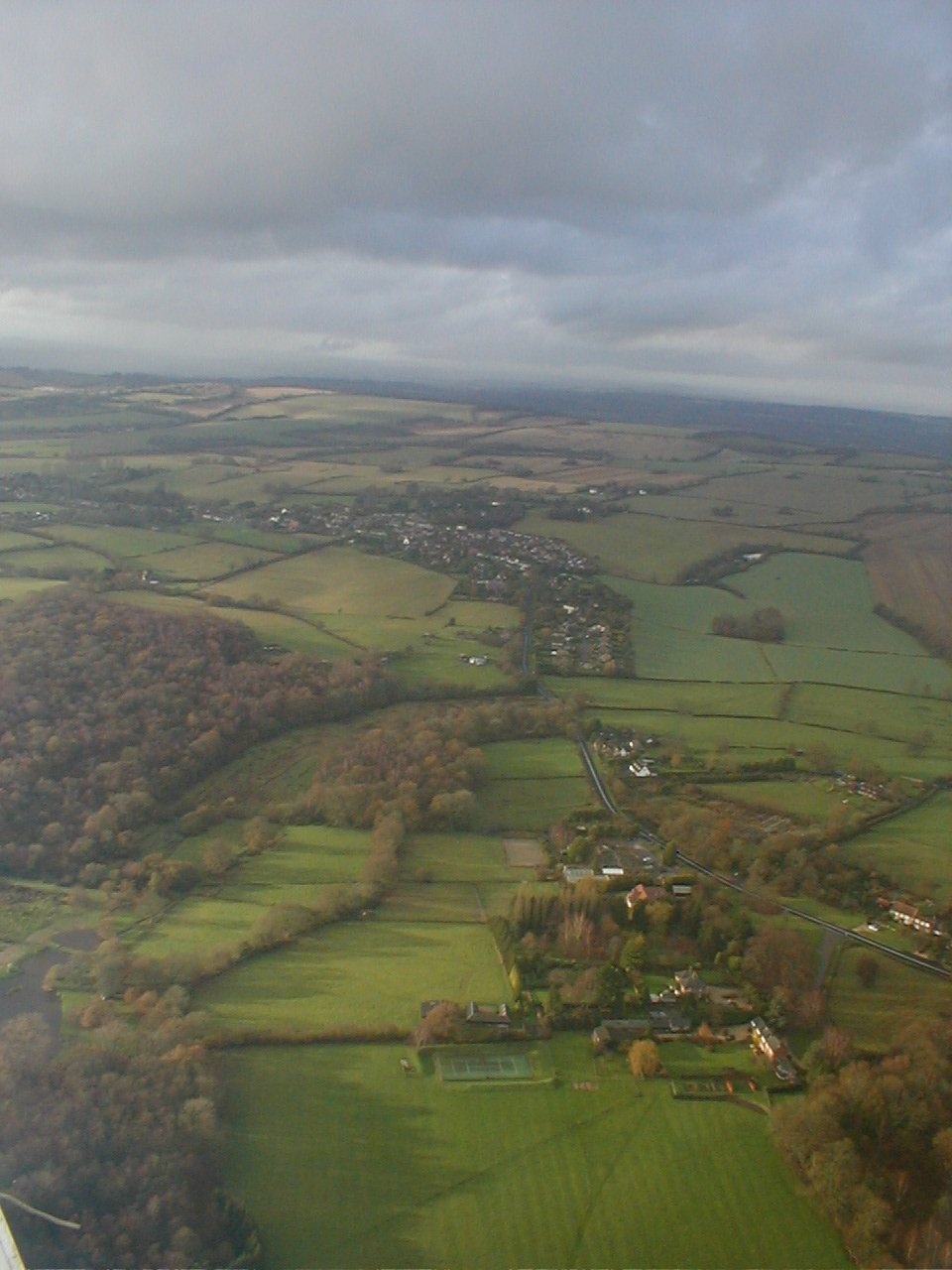
Whiteparish and Cowesfield from the air, looking NW

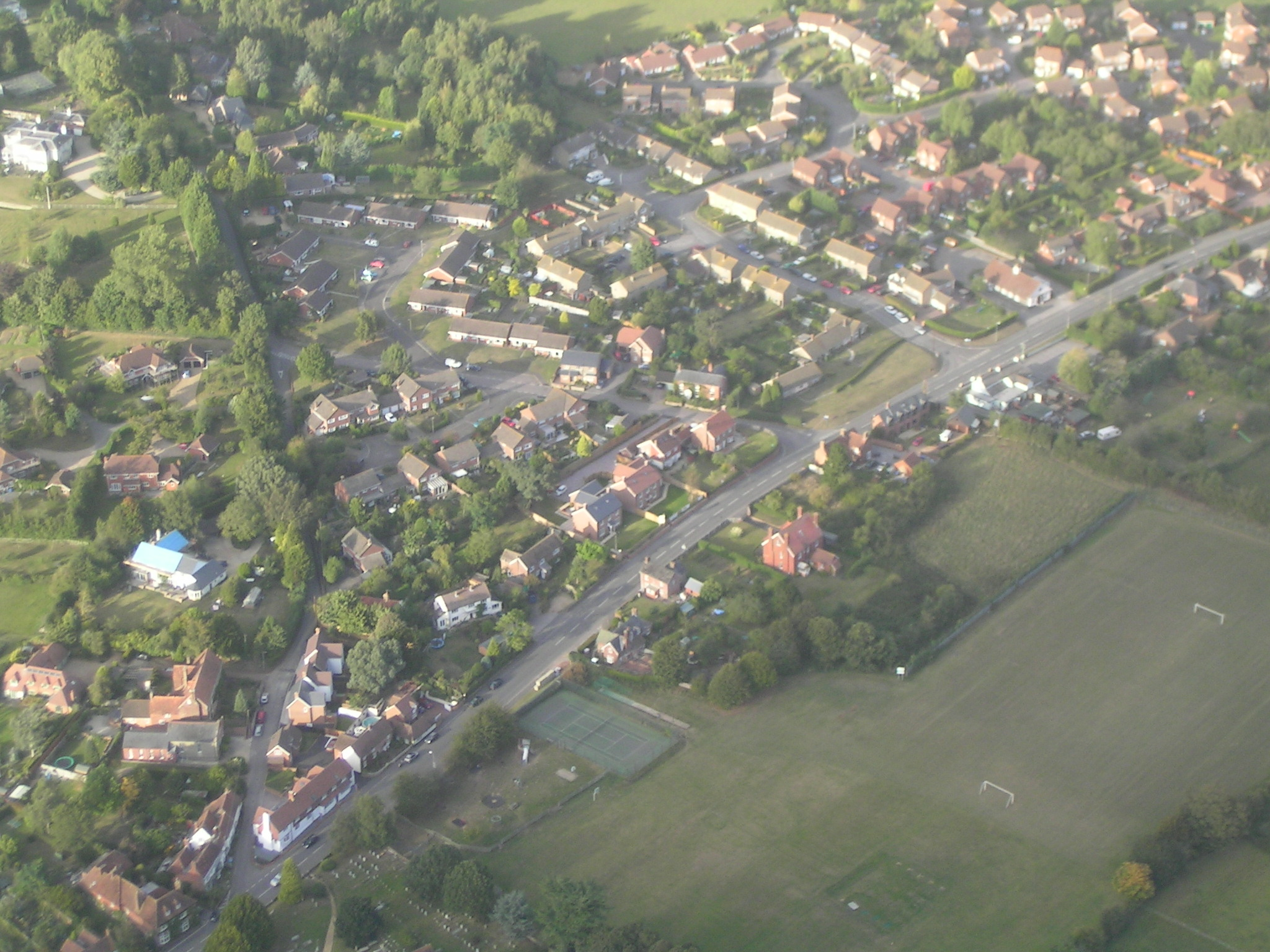
Central area with sportsground, White Hart public house (now houses)

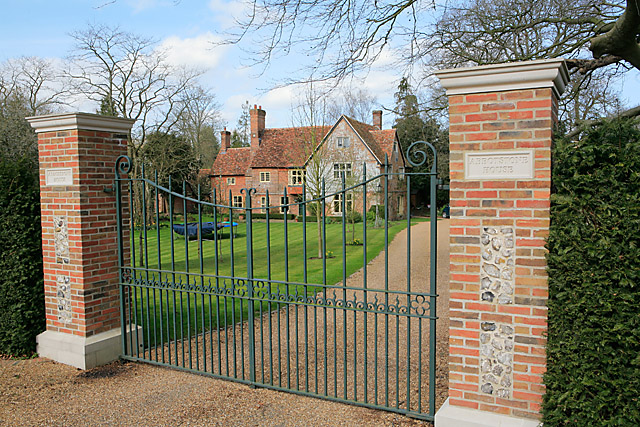
Abbotstone House, The Street
