= Richard Cosin =

Member of the Parliament of England

Richard Cosin (died 1596) was an English jurist. He became prominent as an ecclesiastical lawyer in the service of Archbishop John Whitgift, active against the Puritans in the Church of England.

== Life ==
He was born the son of John Cosin in Hartlepool, and educated in Skipton. He was sent to Trinity College, Cambridge, aged 12. He became an all-round scholar, particularly interested in canon law. He was awarded an LL.D. by the University of Cambridge in 1580.

He was chancellor of the diocese of Worcester in 1582, where Whitgift was bishop. His name appears on the marriage bond of William Shakespeare and Anne Hathaway. He became Dean of the Arches in 1583.

Whitgift made him his Vicar-General of the diocese of Canterbury in 1583, and Dean of the Arches in 1590. Cosin also had duties as a censor of publications.

He entered Parliament as the MP for Downton, Wiltshire in 1584, and was then elected for Hindon, Wiltshire in 1586 and again for Downton in 1589.

In the major confrontation of the 1590s between Anglicans and Thomas Cartwright and his Puritan and presbyterian allies, Cosin with Matthew Sutcliffe for the church lawyers faced the common lawyers Richard Beale and James Morice. Morice attacked the ex officio oath, which Cosin staunchly defended. He argued from the existence, in medieval understanding, of many exceptions to the requirement of an accuser.

His 1592 pamphlet Conspiracie, for Pretended Reformation: viz. Presbyteriall Discipline exploited the scare after the 1591 plot of William Hacket, Edmund Coppinger, and Henry Arthington. Cosin noted in it that the presbyterian notion of discipline included the ideas of resistance to bad magistrates, and deposition of kings. It also contains discussion, relating to Hacket, showing contemporary definitions of degrees of insanity.

An apologie for sundrie proceedings by jurisdiction ecclesiastical (1593) is his major work. He expressed the views that Magna Carta implied that the English monarchy did not have absolute power, but that it had no application to ecclesiastical jurisdiction.

He supported the education of William Barlow, his biographer (1598).
