= George Ryves (MP) =

Member of the Parliament of England for Wareham
- In office 10 January 1689 – 18 March 1689

Personal details
- Born: 18 October 1627
- Died: 1689 (aged 61–62)
- Education: Middle Temple

George Ryves (18 October 1627 – 1689) was an English politician who served as a Member of Parliament (MP) for Wareham.

== Biography ==
Ryves was born into the Ryves family which acquired large scattered estates in Dorset in the Tudor period. His grandfather John Ryves represented Downton in the Addled Parliament of 1614 and his father was a Royalist in the English Civil War. Ryves was High Sheriff of Dorset from 1681 to 1682.

== See also ==
- List of MPs elected to the English Parliament in 1689
