= Clipsby Crew =

English politician

Sir Clipsby Crewe (1599 – June 1648) was an English politician who sat in the House of Commons from 1624 to 1626.

Crewe was the elder son of Sir Ranulph Crewe, Lord Chief Justice of England, and his first wife Julia Clipsby. He matriculated from St John's College, Cambridge at Easter 1616 and was admitted at Lincoln's Inn on 29 May 1619. He was of Crewe Hall and was knighted on 18 June 1620.

In 1624, Crewe was elected Member of Parliament for Downton in Wiltshire. He was re-elected MP for Downton in 1625. In 1626 he was elected MP for Callington in Cornwall.

Crewe married Jane Pulteney (d.1639) and had sons Ralph, who was an artist killed in Paris, and John and a daughter Frances. Crewe's family have memorials in Westminster Abbey.

Crewe died at the age of 48. His granddaughter Anne Crewe eventually succeeded to the inheritance. She married John Offley of Madeley Old Manor, Staffordshire. Her great-grandson was raised to the peerage as Baron Crewe of Crewe in 1806. Crewe's brother John was also an MP in 1654.

Parliament of England
Preceded by Sir Carew Raleigh; Thomas Hinton	Member of Parliament for Downton; 1624–1625; With: Sir William Dodington 1624; Edward Herbert	Succeeded by Edward Herbert; Sir William Tremhall
Preceded by Sir Richard Weston; Thomas Wise	Member of Parliament for Callington; 1626; With: John Rolle	Succeeded by John Rolle; Sir Wiliam Constable
