= Thomas Duncombe (died 1779) =

British politician

Thomas Duncombe (baptised 27 August 1724 – 23 November 1779) was a British politician who sat in the House of Commons between 1751 and 1779.

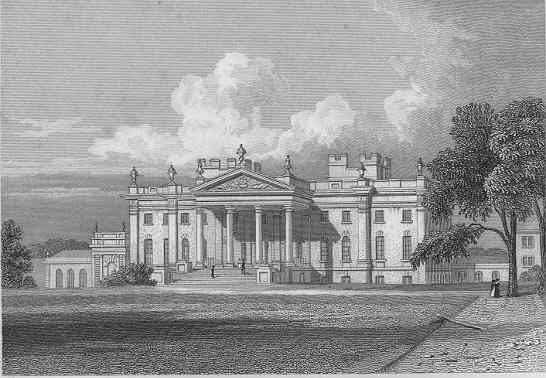
Duncombe Park, 1839

Duncombe was the eldest son of Thomas Duncombe, of Duncombe Park, North Yorkshire and his wife, Mary Slingsby, daughter of Sir Thomas Slingsby. He was educated at Westminster School from an early age in 1732, and matriculated at Christ Church, Oxford on 18 May 1742, aged 17. He succeeded his father to Duncombe Park in 1746 and is also known as Thomas Duncombe III.

In 1751, Duncombe was returned as Member of Parliament for the Downton constituency. In 1754 he was elected MP for Morpeth. When the Militia was reformed in 1759 the Lord Lieutenant of the North Riding, the Earl of Holderness, felt obliged to give Duncombe a command, even though he was a political opponent. Duncombe served as Colonel of the Cleveland and Bulmer Battalion, North York Militia,

On the death of his cousin Lord Feversham in 1763, Duncombe inherited an interest at Downton, and in 1768 was returned to Parliament unopposed. In 1774 his control of the Downton seat was challenged and he was unseated on petition. He was returned unopposed for Downton in 1779, but died a few weeks later on 23 November 1779. There is no record of his having spoken in Parliament. Duncombe Bay on Norfolk Island an external territory of Australia located in the South Pacific is named after him.

== Family ==
Duncombe married firstly Lady Diana Howard (1723-1770) daughter of Henry Howard, 4th Earl of Carlisle on 9 February 1749. Their daughter Anne married Robert Shafto.

He married secondly Anne Jennings (1749-1777), daughter of Sir Philip Jennings Clerke, Bt on 24 February 1772. Their daughter Frances (1775-1861) married George Henry Rose and was mother to Hugh Rose, 1st Baron Strathnairn, Sir William Rose and the Countess of Morton.

He married thirdly Charlotte Hale, daughter of William Hale of King's Walden, Hertfordshire on 25 June 1778.

Having no sons, Duncombe's estates at Barford, near Downton and Duncombe Park devolved to his younger brother Charles Slingsby Duncombe and thence to Charles Duncombe, 1st Baron Feversham.

== Sources ==
- History of the Cases of Controverted Elections: Which Were Tried and Determined During the First and Second Sessions of the Fourteenth Parliament of Great Britain, 15 & 16 Geo. III. Sylvester Douglas Baron Glenbervie L. Hansard, 1802 P207-239

Parliament of Great Britain
Preceded by Colonel Henry Vane; George Procter	Member of Parliament for Downton; 1751–1754; With: Colonel Henry Vane 1751-1753; James Hayes 1753-1754	Succeeded by James Hayes; James Cope
Preceded by Robert Ord; Viscount Limerick	Member of Parliament for Morpeth; 1754–1768; With: Robert Ord 1754-1755; Sir Matthew Fetherstonhaugh 1755-1761; Viscount Garlies 1761-1768	Succeeded by Peter Beckford; Sir Matthew White Ridley
Preceded by Thomas Pym Hales; James Hayes	Member of Parliament for Downton; 1768–1775; With: Richard Croftes 1768-1771; James Hayes 1771-1774; Thomas Dummer 1774-1775	Succeeded by John Cooper; Sir Philip Hales
Preceded by John Cooper; Sir Philip Hales	Member of Parliament for Downton; 1779–1779; With: Sir Philip Hales	Succeeded by Bartholomew Bouverie; Sir Philip Hales
