= The Pepperbox =

Folly in Whiteparish, Wiltshire, England

Coordinates: 51°01′22″N 1°41′54″W

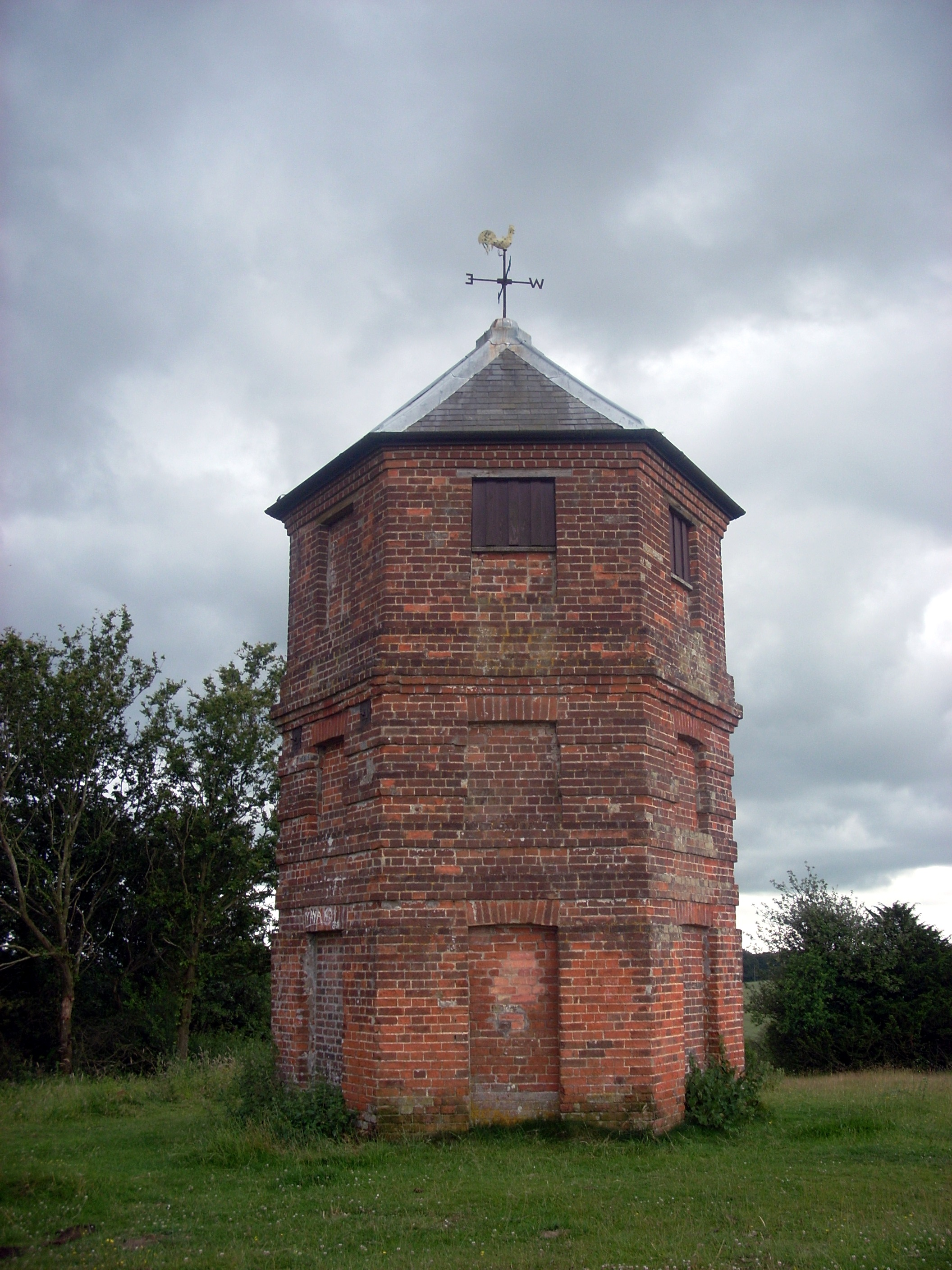
The Pepperbox in 2014

The Pepperbox, also known as Eyre's Folly, is a folly tower that stands near the highest point on Pepperbox Hill, the peak of a chalk ridge about 5 miles (8 km) south-east of the city of Salisbury, Wiltshire, England. Built in 1606 by Giles Eyre, the folly is a three-storey hexagonal tower constructed of brick, with its entrances and windows blocked up. The building's original purpose is unknown, though theories include that it was built to provide Eyre with views of Longford Castle or to provide local landowners' wives, including Eyre's wife Jane, with a lookout tower to watch the hunt. The tower is considered one of the oldest follies, and is a Grade II listed building. The tower and hillside are owned by the National Trust.

== Origins and purpose ==
Although the Historic England listing dates The Pepperbox to the early 18th century, it is accepted that the tower was built in 1606 by Giles Eyre of the nearby Brickworth House, hence the alternate name "Eyre's Folly". Eyre is known for being the father of settler John Eyre and grandfather of Giles Eyre, a judge. The original purpose of the tower is unknown. One theory is that Eyre was envious of Longford Castle, recently built by Sir Thomas Gorges, and built the Pepperbox to overlook the castle; the epitaph on Eyre's gravestone describes him as "a man much oppressed by publick power." Another is that the tower was built as a hunting stand, perhaps so the local landowners' wives – including Eyre's wife Jane, whom he married in 1603 – could watch the hunt in comfort without being exposed to public gaze. In their book Follies, Grottoes and Garden Building, Gwen Headley and Wim Meulenkamp consider the hunting stand theory to be "saner" given that the tower lacks a "folly atmosphere". One account states: "It can be counted as a folly but may have been used a lookout so that ladies could follow the progress of the hunt, away from the rain and mud".

It has alternately been suggested that the 1606 date is an erroneous dating due to a coincidence of names, and that the tower was more probably built by Eyres' great-great-grandson Giles Eyre (1664–1734) in the early 18th century. The elder Giles Eyre was the first of five generations of owners with the same name covering the period from 1606 to 1750 and by the time the younger Eyres owned the Brickworth estate, it had grown to include the land on which the Pepperbox stands, which had not been the case in 1606.

== Description and location ==
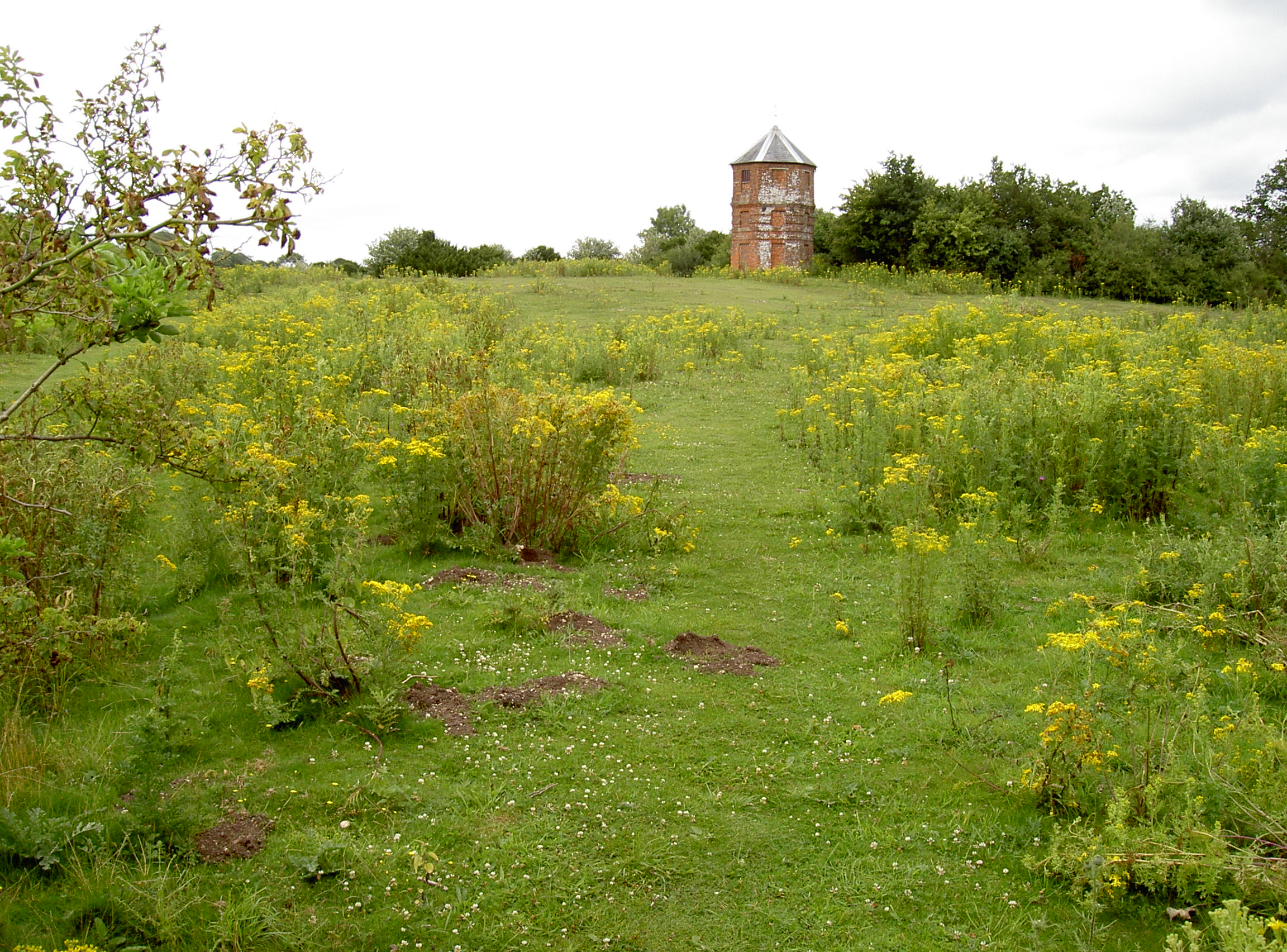
Approach to the Pepperbox across the chalk downs

The Pepperbox is a hexagonal, three-storey tower constructed of English bond brick, with a low, pyramidal Welsh slate roof that was rebuilt around 1900, topped by a weather vane. The ground floor's doorways are segmental-headed, indicating the building originally stood on open arches. The first floor features three-brick plat bands, while the second floor has a stepped cornice with windows under timber lintels. The building's doorways (one per face) and windows (one per face on the first and second floors) are all bricked in, a change that happened at an unknown time. The name "The Pepperbox" came about due to the tower's resemblance to a pepper pot or pepper box, used in the 17th and 18th centuries, and consequently also inspired the name of the hill that it stands on. The tower bears some similarities with the influential, octagonal Tower of the Winds in Athens, Greece, as does the 1782 folly of the same name at Mount Stewart, although the Pepperbox predates Nicholas Revett and James Stuart's recording of the Athens tower by some 150 years.

The folly stands at the high point of the chalk ridge south-east of the city of Salisbury, Wiltshire. The highest point of Pepperbox Hill is further along the ridge to the north-west, where there is an Ordnance Survey triangulation pillar. The site is in the north-west corner of the parish of Whiteparish, but is more closely associated with the village of Alderbury, which the tower overlooks. The hill has far-reaching views both east and west, including over Salisbury. Gwen Headley suggests that the tower was built in the open countryside at such a location because Eyre believed that the land which the hill overlooks would "last forever," and that this potential impetus has been obscured by the changing of the landscape in the subsequent centuries. The folly is surrounded by a diverse habitat boasting many uncommon species including juniper, orchids and yew woodland.

== Later history ==
In the early 18th century, the Pepperbox was allegedly used as a haunt by highwaymen, who would attack carriages as they reached the summit of the hill, when the horses would be tired by the climb. The tower was used as a lookout post by the local Home Guard during World War II. It was designated a Grade II listed building as "The Pepperbox" in 1960, and today, both the folly and the hill it stands on are property of the National Trust.

In August and September 1990 a series of free parties were held next to the Pepperbox. These parties were organised by a loose anarchist collective who became known as the People From Pepperbox, or PFP. The Pepperbox parties are generally regarded as being amongst the first of their kind, where the concepts of raves and free festivals combined; with the resulting events becoming known as free parties.

=== Assessment ===
Despite the theory that the Pepperbox was used as a lookout tower, it is today considered one of the earliest follies, dating from before the term "folly" was first used. The Pepperbox and the three other follies in and around Salisbury are regarded as the four oldest follies in Wiltshire. Regarding the Pepperbox, Headley writes that due to the tower being "isolated, unprotected, enigmatic and blank," the sudden sight of the "strange, anonymous small building" provokes questions from unfamiliar passers-by. She notes that the tower is considered a folly because it is a "misunderstood building." In their 1976 volume on Wiltshire in the Buildings of England series, Nikolaus Pevsner and Bridget Cherry note the Pepperbox as one of several early 17th century "oddments" in the county, alongside the two triangular gatehouses of Amesbury, built in 1600 and 1607, and Newhouse in Redlynch, built in 1619. The Pepperbox is listed in Peter Long's book The Hidden Places of England.

== See also ==
- Pepper Pot, Brighton – also named in reference to its shape
