= William Coles (MP) =

English lawyer and politician

William Coles (c. 1616–1697) was an English lawyer and politician who sat in the House of Commons in 1659 and in 1660.

Coles was the son of Barnabas Coles of Woodfalls and his wife Katherine Barnes. He was a student of Brasenose College, Oxford in 1635. He was admitted at Middle Temple in 1637 and was called to the bar in 1645. In 1648, he was a commissioner for militia for Wiltshire. He was a J.P. from 1653 to July 1660. He was commissioner for scandalous ministers in 1654, commissioner for assessment in 1657, commissioner for militia for Wiltshire again in 1659 and commissioner for sequestrations in 1659.

In 1659, Coles was elected Member of Parliament for Downton in the Third Protectorate Parliament. He was commissioner for assessment in January 1660 and commissioner for militia for Wiltshire again in March 1660. In April 1660 he was elected MP for Downton again in a double return for the Convention Parliament. He was allowed to sit on the merits of the return, but he was unseated six days later.

Coles died at the age of about 80.

Coles married firstly under settlement dated 25 March 1647 Eleanor Fitzjames, daughter of Leweston Fitzjames of Leweston, Dorset, and had three sons. He married secondly before 1657, Joyce who had two sons and two daughters. He married thirdly on 21 July 1690, Elizabeth Raleigh, widow. of Gilbert Raleigh of Downton and daughter of James Goddard of South Marston, Wiltshire.

Parliament of England
Preceded by Not represented in Second Protectorate Parliament	Member of Parliament for Downton; 1659; With: Thomas Fitzjames	Succeeded by Sir Anthony Ashley Cooper
Preceded by Sir Anthony Ashley Cooper	Member of Parliament for Downton; 1660; With: Thomas Fitzjames	Succeeded by Giles Eyre; John Elliott
