= Maurice Bocland =

Maurice Bocland may refer to:

- Maurice Bocland (1648–1710), Member of Parliament for Downton
- Lieutenant-General Maurice Bocland (died 1765), British soldier and Member of Parliament, son of the above
