= Ashe baronets =

Extinct baronetcy in the Baronetage of England

- Escutcheon of the Ashe baronets of Twickenham
- Creation date: 1660
- Status: extinct
- Extinction date: 1733

The Ashe Baronetcy, of Twickenham in the County of Middlesex, was a title in the Baronetage of England. It was created on 19 September 1660 for Joseph Ashe, subsequently member of parliament for Downton. The second baronet also represented Downton in Parliament. The title became extinct on his death in 1733.

== Ashe baronets, of Twickenham (1660) ==
- Sir Joseph Ashe, 1st Baronet (1617–1686)
- Sir James Ashe, 2nd Baronet (1674–1733)
