= Thomas Plumer =

British judge and politician

Sir Thomas Plumer
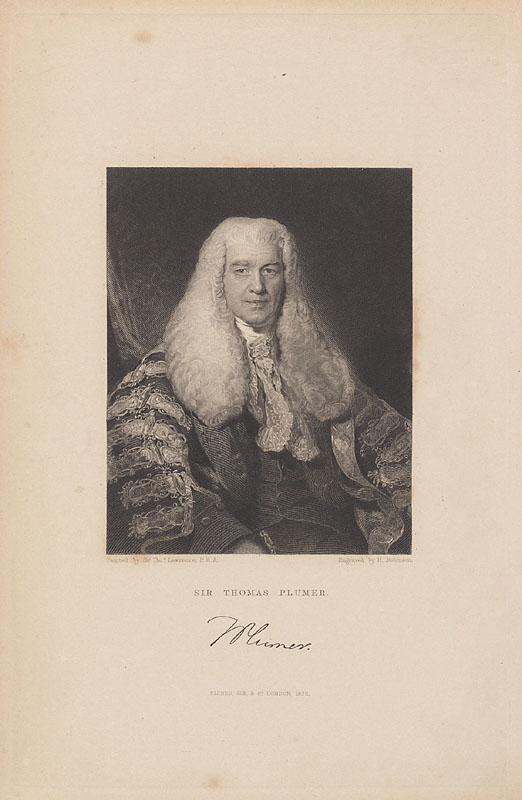

Solicitor General
- In office 1807–1812
- Preceded by: Sir Samuel Romilly
- Succeeded by: Sir William Garrow

Member of Parliament for Downton
- In office 1807–1813 Serving with Bartholomew Bouverie (Note: Served from 1807–1812); Charles Bouverie (Note: Served from 1812–1813)
- Preceded by: Duncombe Pleydell-Bouverie; Bartholomew Bouverie
- Succeeded by: Edward Golding; Sir Thomas Brooke-Pechell

Attorney General
- In office 1812–1813
- Preceded by: Sir Vicary Gibbs
- Succeeded by: Sir William Garrow

Master of the Rolls
- In office 1818–1824
- Preceded by: Sir William Grant
- Succeeded by: Robert Gifford

Personal details
- Born: 10 October 1753
- Died: 24 March 1824 (aged 70)

Sir Thomas Plumer (10 October 1753 – 24 March 1824) was a British judge and politician, the first Vice-Chancellor of England and later Master of the Rolls.

== Early life and education ==
Plumer was the second son of wine merchant Thomas Plumer (died 17 March 1781) of Lilling Hall, Yorkshire, and Ann Nancy, daughter of John Thompson of Kirby Hall, Yorkshire. His brother was Hall Plumer of Stockton Hall. He married Marianne, daughter of John Turton of Sugnall; one of their great-grandsons was General Plumer.

Plumer was educated at Eton College and University College, Oxford, where he was Vinerian Scholar in 1777, also entering Lincoln's Inn and being called to the bar in 1778. He was elected a fellow of University College in 1780 and was awarded the Bachelor of Civil Law degree in 1783.

== Career ==
In 1781, Plumer was appointed a Commissioner in bankruptcy. He acted for the defence in a number of high-profile cases: he defended Sir Thomas Rumbold in 1783, was one of the three counsel for the defence in the Impeachment of Warren Hastings, successfully defended Viscount Melville in his impeachment in 1806, and assisted in the defence of the Princess of Wales in the same year. In 1807, Plumer was appointed Solicitor General in the Duke of Portland's government, and knighted; a House of Commons seat was found for him in the Wiltshire pocket borough of Downton. He was subsequently promoted to Attorney General in 1812 then, in the legal reorganisation that took place the following year, was elevated to the bench to take up the new post of Vice Chancellor of England. On 6 January 1818 he was appointed Master of the Rolls, and served in that post until his death on 24 March 1824.

== Sources ==
- Concise Dictionary of National Biography (1930)
- Leigh Rayment's Historical List of MPs – Constituencies beginning with "D" (part 3)

Legal offices
Preceded by Sir Samuel Romilly	Solicitor General; 1807–1812	Succeeded by Sir William Garrow
Preceded by Sir Vicary Gibbs	Attorney General; 1812–1813	Succeeded by Sir William Garrow
Preceded by Sir William Grant	Master of the Rolls; 1818–1824	Succeeded by Lord Gifford
Parliament of Great Britain
Preceded by Hon. Bartholomew Bouverie; Hon. Duncombe Pleydell-Bouverie	Member of Parliament for Downton; 1807–1813; With: Hon. Bartholomew Bouverie 1807–12; Charles Henry Bouverie 1812–13	Succeeded by Sir Thomas Brooke-Pechell; Edward Golding
