= Edward Herbert (attorney-general) =

English lawyer and politician (1591-1658)

Arms of Herbert: Per pale azure and gules, three lions rampant argent

Sir Edward Herbert (c. 1591–1658) of Aston in Montgomeryshire, was an English lawyer and politician who sat in the House of Commons at various times between 1621 and 1641. He was Attorney-General under King Charles I.

== Origins ==
Herbert was the son of Charles Herbert of Aston, Montgomeryshire, and was a first cousin of Edward Herbert, Baron Herbert of Cherbury. His grandfather was Sir Edward Herbert (d. 1593) (great-nephew of William Herbert, 1st Earl of Pembroke (1423–1469)), Constable of Aberystwith Castle (16 March 1543–4), High Sheriff of Montgomeryshire in 1557 and 1568, a member of parliament for Montgomeryshire in 1553 and 1556–57, and an Esquire of the Body to Queen Elizabeth I.

== Career ==
He was admitted to the Inner Temple in November 1609 and was called to the bar in 1618. In 1621 he was elected a member of parliament for Montgomery. He was elected MP for Downton, Wiltshire in 1624 for the Happy Parliament and was re-elected in 1626 and 1629.

In April 1640 Herbert was elected MP for Reading and for Old Sarum and chose to sit for Old Sarum in the Short Parliament. He was re-elected MP for Old Sarum in November 1640 for the Long Parliament. Having been appointed Attorney-General he was instructed by King Charles I to take legal proceedings against various members of parliament who had been concerned in the passing of the Grand Remonstrance. The only result, however, was Herbert's own impeachment by the House of Commons in 1641 and his imprisonment.

Later in life he lived in exile with the royal family in Holland and in France, becoming Lord Keeper of the Great Seal to King Charles II in April 1653, an office which he had refused in 1645. He resigned that office the next year. He died in Paris in January 1658, and was buried in the Huguenot Saint-Germain Cemetery.

== Marriage and progeny ==
Herbert married Margaret Smith, widow of Thomas Carey of Sunninghill Park, Berkshire and daughter of Thomas Smith of Abingdon-on-Thames and Parson's Green, Middlesex. Herbert's sons included:

- Arthur Herbert, 1st Earl of Torrington (1648–1716);
- Sir Edward Herbert (c. 1648–1698).

Parliament of England
Preceded by Sir John Danvers	Member of Parliament for Montgomery; 1621–1622	Succeeded by George Herbert
Preceded by Sir Clipsby Crew; Sir William Dodington	Member of Parliament for Downton; 1625–1629; With: Sir Clipsby Crew 1625; Sir William Tremhall 1626; Sir Benjamin Rudyerd 1628–1629	Parliament suspended until 1640
Vacant Parliament suspended since 1629	Member of Parliament for Reading; 1640; With: Sir John Berkeley	Succeeded by Francis Knollys III; Adm. Francis Knollys
Vacant Parliament suspended since 1629	Member of Parliament for Old Sarum; 1640–1641; With: Sir William Howard 1640; Hon. Robert Cecil 1640–1641	Succeeded by Hon. Robert Cecil; Sir William Savile
Legal offices
Preceded by Sir Edward Littleton	Solicitor General; 1640–1641	Succeeded by Oliver St John
Preceded by Sir John Bankes	Attorney General; 1641–1645	Succeeded by Thomas Gardiner (Royal); Oliver St John (Parliamentary)
Preceded by Thomas Gardiner	Attorney General (to the Royal Court in exile); 1649–1653	Post vacant until restoration
Vacant Title last held by Sir Richard Lane	Lord Keeper of the Great Seal; 1653–1654	Vacant Title next held by Sir Edward Hyde
