= Giles Wigginton =

English clergyman

Giles Wigginton (fl. 1564 – 1597) was an English clergyman who became a fringe religious activist towards the end of the sixteenth century.

== Life ==
Wigginton was born at Oundle in Northamptonshire and was educated at the Oundle School and the University of Cambridge, under the patronage of Sir Walter Mildmay. He matriculated as a sizar of Trinity College in October 1564, and in 1566 was elected a scholar. He proceeded B.A. in 1569, and was subsequently elected a Fellow, over opposition from the Master John Whitgift who disliked his Puritan views. He commenced M.A. in 1572, having studied divinity, Greek, and Hebrew.

On 3 September 1579 Wigginton was instituted to the vicarage of Sedbergh, then in Yorkshire, on the presentation of Trinity College, but found his Calvinism unpopular. In 1581 Edwin Sandys, archbishop of York, wrote concerning Wigginton to his diocesan William Chaderton, bishop of Chester, remarking ‘He laboureth not to build, but to pull down, and by what means he can to overthrow the state ecclesiastical’ In 1584, when in London, he was appointed to preach before the judges in the church of St. Dunstan-in-the-West. Whitgift, by then archbishop of Canterbury, sent a pursuivant to Wigginton at night while he was in bed, to forbid him to preach and require him to give a bond for his appearance at Lambeth the next day. On his appearance before Whitgift he was tendered an oath ex officio to answer certain articles unknown to him. Wigginton refused, and Whitgift committed him to the Gatehouse Prison, where he remained for over two months. On his release he was admonished not to preach in the province of Canterbury without further licence.

In the following year, on the information of Edward Middleton, Whitgift gave orders to Sandys to proceed against Wigginton, and he was in consequence cited before Chaderton and deprived of his living.

On 14 March 1586 Wigginton was present at the trial of Margaret Clitherow in York. When the judge sentenced her to peine fort et dure for refusing to plead, Wigginton stood up in court and protested that she should not be put to death on the basis of a child's testimony and that while the Queen's law might allow such a penalty, God's law did not. Wiggington subsequently visited Clitherow in prison and tried to convert her, arguing that his faith gave him an assurance of salvation predestination which she admitted she did not possess, and that the willingness of Catholic priests to die for their faith did not prove its truth, since Protestants had also been martyred under Mary I. Clitherow's biographer Katharine Longley says that Fr John Mush's account of their exchanges suggest that Clitherow respected Wigginton's sincerity but he failed to shake her determination.

Later in 1586, while visiting London, he was apprehended by one of Whitgift's pursuivants, brought before the archbishop at Lambeth, and, on refusing the oath again, was committed to the White Lion prison, where he was treated harshly. He was removed to another prison, and, on failing through illness to obey a citation of the archbishop, he was sentenced to deprivation and degradation, in spite of the intercession of Ambrose Dudley, 3rd Earl of Warwick and Henry Hastings, 3rd Earl of Huntingdon.

On his release and recovery he returned to Sedbergh, but without permission to preach. He did preach, at his own house and elsewhere, gathering large audiences. Whitgift then instigated Sandys to issue an attachment, and Wigginton was arrested by a pursuivant at Boroughbridge and taken to Lancaster Castle. From there on 28 February 1587 he despatched a letter to Sir Walter Mildmay, soliciting his assistance. He was released before December 1588, for in that month he was again arrested in London and brought before the high commissioners at Lambeth on the charge of being concerned in the authorship of the Marprelate tracts. Though he denied the accusation he declined the oath tendered to him, and was committed to the Gatehouse, where he long remained in confinement.

During his imprisonment he was nearly involved in the punishment of the fanatic William Hacket, whom he had met at some time during a visit to Oundle, their common birthplace. He became a disciple, and was also the confidant, of another enthusiast, Edmund Coppinger. Around Easter 1591 Hacket came to London and visited Wigginton in prison. Wigginton introduced Hacket to Coppinger, and they found common cause in English ecclesiastical and social reform. It is not clear how far Wigginton was privy to the subsequent plotting, which ended in the suicide of Coppinger and the execution of Hacket. A pamphlet entitled The Fool's Bolt, put into circulation by them, is ascribed to him by John Strype.

Around 1592 Wigginton was restored to the vicarage of Sedbergh by the direction of Lord Burghley.

The date of Wigginton's death is unknown.

== Works ==
On 4 April 1597 he wrote to Burghley, proposing the establishment of a seminary to train men for controversy with Catholic priests, and presenting him with a manuscript anti-Catholic treatise. While in prison he composed A Treatise on Predestination. He was also the author of Giles Wigginton his Catechisme (London, 1589), and of several theological treatises in manuscript that came into the possession of Dawson Turner.
