= Sir William Savile, 3rd Baronet =

English politician

William Savile
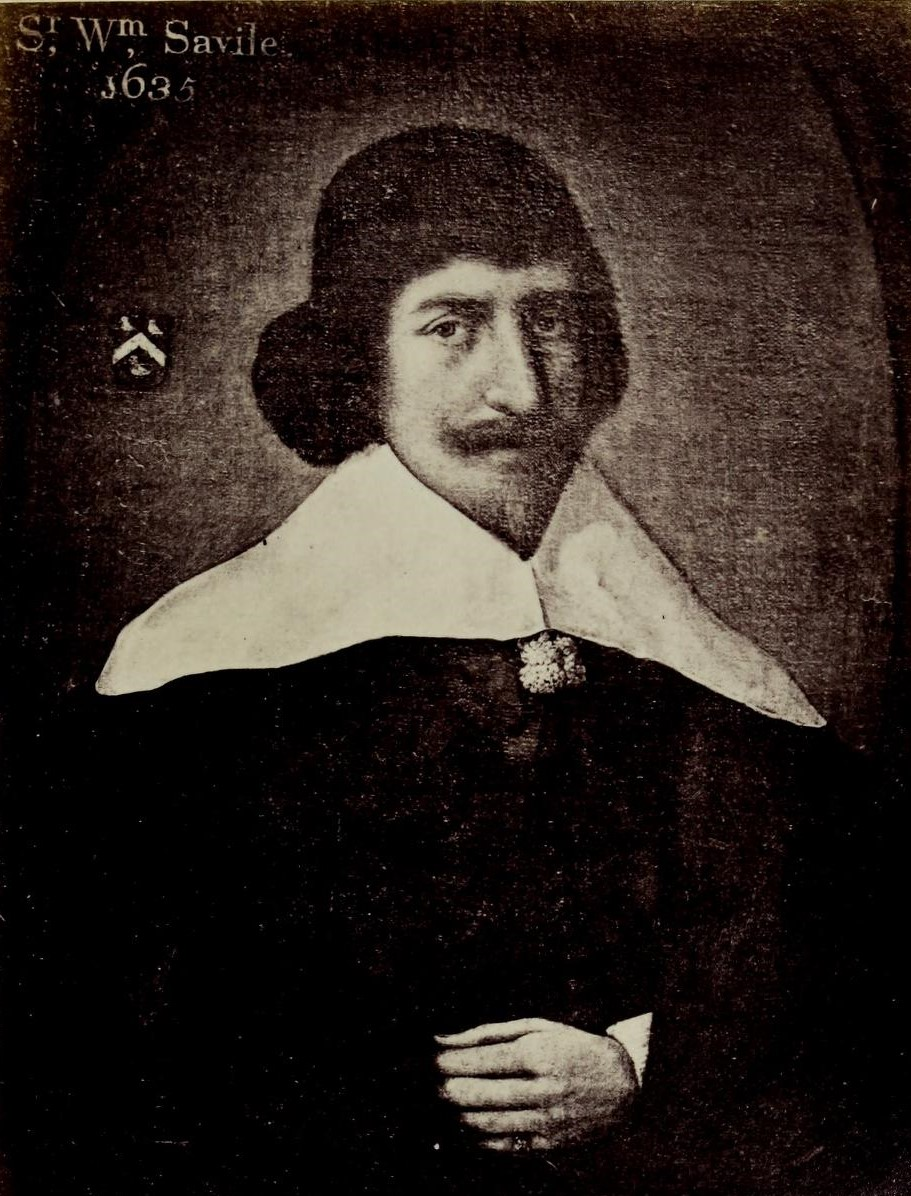

3rd Baronet of Thornhill

Member of Parliament for Old Sarum
- In office 1641–1642

Member of the Short Parliament for Yorkshire
- In office 1640–1641

Personal details
- Born: 1612 Thornhill, West Yorkshire
- Died: 24 January 1644 (aged 31–32)
- Children: 7, including George and Henry

Sir William Savile, 3rd Baronet of Thornhill (1612 – 24 January 1644) was an English politician who sat in the House of Commons between 1640 and 1642. He fought on the Royalist side in the English Civil War and was killed in action.

Savile was born at Thornhill, the son of Sir George Savile and Anne Wentworth, and the grandson of Sir George Savile, 1st Baronet. He inherited the baronetcy on the death of his brother George in 1626. Included in the family estates were the residences of Thornhill Hall, Rufford Abbey, and a house in York. He was educated at University College, Oxford and entered Gray's Inn in 1628. Wentworth selected him to be Deputy Lieutenant of the West Riding in 1633, and he was appointed to the council in the north in July 1636.

In April 1640, Savile was elected Member of Parliament for Yorkshire in the Short Parliament. In parliament, he spoke against ship money and signed the petition against forced billeting, but he remained loyal to the king. He was defeated in the election of November 1640 and was returned as MP for Old Sarum in a by-election early in 1641. He gave evidence in favour of Strafford and supported him throughout the trial. He was himself committed to the Tower on 12 June for an unidentified offence and let out on 29 June after a reprimand from the Speaker. Savile was with the king at Nottingham when the royal standard was raised on 22 August 1642. He was marked as a "suspicious man" and was disabled from sitting in the Commons by parliament.

Towards the end of 1642 Savile was placed in command at Leeds when Newcastle marched into the West Riding but on 23 January 1643 Fairfax captured the town after a fierce attack and Savile swam across the River Aire to escape. In May 1643 he was appointed governor of the town of Sheffield and of Sheffield Castle and then transferred to York. In October 1643 he was in command of the Royalist cavalry at the Battle of Winceby. He died at or near York fighting for the king in January 1644. He had converted Thornhill Hall into a garrison for the King's forces, and it was demolished by parliamentary forces after its capture by Cromwell.

== Family ==
Savile married Anne, daughter of Thomas Coventry, 1st Baron Coventry, on 29 December 1629. She became celebrated as a heroine of the civil war when she was besieged by the Parliamentarians in Sheffield Castle. She gave a gallant and warlike defence to the battering from guns on all sides, in spite of her advanced pregnancy. Against her orders, the garrison eventually surrendered the crumbling castle and she gave birth the same night on 11 August 1644.

Sir William & Lady Anne had seven children:

- Mary (b.1632)
- George (b.1633) who succeeded William as the 4th Baronet and then later created Marquess of Halifax.
- Anne (b.1634) married Thomas Windsor, 1st Earl of Plymouth
- William (b.1635)
- Margaret (b.1640)
- Henry (b.1642)
- Talbot (b.1644) born during the siege of Sheffield Castle

About eleven years after Savile's death, Anne married circa 1655 to Sir Thomas Chicheley and had two further sons.

Parliament of England
Parliament suspended since 1629	Member of Parliament for Yorkshire; 1640; With: Henry Belasyse	Succeeded by Henry Belasyse; The Lord Fairfax of Cameron
Preceded by Hon. Robert Cecil; Edward Herbert	Member of Parliament for Old Sarum; 1641–1642; With: Hon. Robert Cecil	Succeeded by Hon. Robert Cecil; Roger Kirkham
Baronetage of England
Preceded by George Savile	Baronet (of Thornhill); 1626–1644	Succeeded by George Savile
