= Henry White (died 1570) =

English politician

Henry White (1531/1532–1570) was an English politician.

He was a member (MP) of the parliament of England for Reigate in April 1554 and for Downton in 1555.
