= Charles Longueville =

British lawyer and politician

Charles Longueville (c. 1678–1750) was a British lawyer and Tory and later Whig politician who sat in the House of Commons from 1715 to 1741.

Longueville was the eldest son of. William Longueville, barrister, of Inner Temple and his wife Elizabeth Peyton, daughter. of Sir Thomas Peyton, 2nd Baronet, of Knowlton, Kent. His grandfather, Sir Thomas Longueville had been forced to sell the family estates of Bradwell, Buckinghamshire in 1650 as a result of the Civil War. He was admitted at Inner Temple on 5 February 1693 and at Clare College, Cambridge on 24 June 1695. In 1702, he was called to the bar. He succeeded his father in 1721.

Longueville was returned as a Tory Member of Parliament for Downton at the 1715 general election . He voted against the Government in all recorded divisions. In 1721 the committee enquiring into the South Sea Bubble revealed that he had accepted stock from the company without paying for it. At the 1722 general election, he was returned as MP for Great Bedwyn on the Bruce interest. At the accession of George II he obtained a court place as auditor to Queen Caroline. He was returned at the 1727 as MP for East Looe and from then on, supported Walpole's Administration. In 1728 he became a bencher of his Inn. He was returned again for East Looe at the 1734 general election. In 1738 he changed his court post and became auditor to Princesses Amelia and Caroline. He did not stand at the 1741 general election.

Longueville died unmarried on 22 or 25 August 1750 and was buried at Westminster Abbey.

Parliament of Great Britain
Preceded by John Sawyer; John Eyre	Member of Parliament for Downton; 1715–1722; With: John Eyre 1715; Giles Eyre 1715-1722	Succeeded by John Verney; Giles Eyre
Preceded by Stephen Bisse; William Sloper	Member of Parliament for Great Bedwyn; 1722–1727; With: Robert Bruce	Succeeded by Sir William Willys; Viscount Lewisham
Preceded by Viscount Malpas; Sir Henry Hoghton	Member of Parliament for East Looe; 1727–1741; With: Sir John Trelawny 1727-1734; Edward Trelawny 1734-1735; Samuel Holden 1735-1740; Henry Legge 1740-1741	Succeeded by Francis Gashry; James Buller
