= John Ryves (MP) =

Member of the Parliament of England for Downton
- In office 5 April 1614 – 7 June 1614 Serving with Gilbert Ralegh

Personal details
- Born: 3 August 1567
- Died: 23 October 1634 (aged 67)
- Relations: George Ryves (grandson)

John Ryves (3 August 1567 – 23 October 1634) was an English politician who served as a Member of Parliament (MP) for Downton.

== Biography ==
Ryves was descended from a junior branch of an ancient Dorset family. During the English Civil War his sons became Royalists. His grandson George Ryves represented Wareham in Parliament.

== See also ==
- List of MPs elected to the English parliament in 1614
