= Sir Thomas Hales, 4th Baronet =

English member of parliament

Sir Thomas Pym Hales, 4th Baronet (c. 1726 – 18 March 1773), of Beakesbourne in Kent, was an English member of parliament.

Hales was the eldest son of Sir Thomas Hales, 3rd Baronet, a long-serving Member of Parliament who held a series of lucrative posts in the Royal Household. He succeeded to his father's baronetcy on 6 October 1762. Earlier the same year, he had entered Parliament as a member of Downton, a pocket borough under the control of his brother-in-law Lord Feversham. He initially supported the government, but in February 1764 he voted with the opposition over the use of general warrants in the Wilkes case, and seems to have been henceforth regarded as of doubtful loyalties.

He did not stand for re-election in 1768, but returned to the Commons at a by-election at Dover in January 1770, as the government-backed candidate, and remained its MP for the remaining three years of his life.

He married Mary Heyward, daughter of Gervase Heyward of Sandwich, in 1764, and they had five daughters:

- Mary Anne Hales (born 1765)
- Jane Hales (born 1766), married Henry Bridges (1769–1855), who later changed his name to Brook
- Elizabeth Hales (born 1769), married John Calcraft of Rempston
- Harriet Hales (born 1770)
- Caroline Hales (1772–1853), married Colonel the Hon. William John Gore (1767–1836)

When Sir Thomas died in 1773, the baronetcy passed to his younger brother, Philip.

Parliament of Great Britain
Preceded by James Hayes; Charles Pratt	Member of Parliament for Downton; 1762–1768; With: James Hayes	Succeeded by Thomas Duncombe; Richard Croftes
Preceded by Hon. Sir Joseph Yorke; Viscount Villiers	Member of Parliament for Dover; 1770–1773; With: Hon. Sir Joseph Yorke	Succeeded by Hon. Sir Joseph Yorke; Thomas Barret
Baronetage of England
Preceded by Thomas Hales	Baronet (of Beakesbourne); 1762–1773	Succeeded by Philip Hales
