= William Henry Bouverie =

British politician

The Honourable William Henry Bouverie

Member of Parliament for Salisbury
- In office 1776-1802

Personal details
- Born: 30 October 1752
- Died: 23 August 1806 (aged 53)
- Spouse: Bridget Douglas (m. 1777)
- Children: 2+, including Charles
- Parent: William Bouverie (father)
- Relatives: Jacob Playdell-Bouverie (brother); Bartholomew Bouverie (brother); Edward Bouverie (brother); Jacob Bouverie (grandfather)
- Education: University College, Oxford

Hon. William Henry Bouverie (30 October 1752 – 23 August 1806) was a British politician who sat in the House of Commons for 26 years from 1776 to 1802.

== Biography ==
Bouverie was the second son of William Bouverie, 1st Earl of Radnor and his second wife Rebecca Alleyne, daughter of John Alleyne, and was born on 30 October 1752. He was educated at Harrow School about 1765 and matriculated at University College, Oxford on 19 March 1771. He was awarded BA in 1773 and MA in 1776.

He married Lady Bridget Douglas, daughter of James Douglas, 14th Earl of Morton on 16 August 1777.

In January 1776, Bouverie's father died and his step-brother was raised to the peerage, leaving a vacancy at Salisbury. Bouverie was returned without a contest as Member of Parliament for Salisbury on the family interest in the ensuing by-election on 19 February 1776. He was re-elected unopposed in 1780.

The English Chronicle wrote of him in 1781, "He is a very constant attendant on his parliamentary duties, and as constantly divides with the Opposition. He has never attempted to display his abilities as an orator in the House ... He possesses an estate of near two thousand pounds per annum, and with this fortune supports the consequence of his rank with great liberality and great respect."

He was a member of the St. Alban's Tavern group which tried to bring together Fox and Pitt. He was re-elected unopposed in 1784. His first recorded speech was on 22 July 1784, eight years after he entered Parliament. He then spoke several times during the Regency crisis, but few other speeches are reported by him.

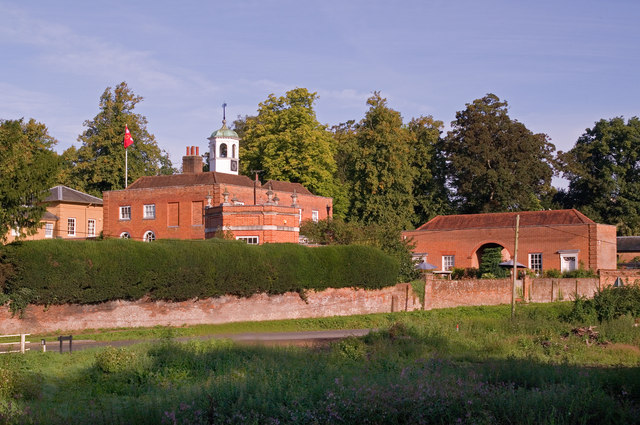
Betchworth House

A distant cousin Elizabeth Bouverie devised the manor and mansion-house at Betchworth to him in the 1780s. He was returned unopposed at Salisbury again in 1790 and in 1796. In 1797 he was a major in the Wiltshire supplementary militia. His health was deteriorating and he retired from Parliament at the 1802 general election in favour of his nephew Viscount Folkestone. He received thanks at Salisbury for his "upright and judicious conduct" during 26 years in the House.

Bouverie was major commandant of the Betchworth Volunteers in 1803 and 1804.

He died on 23 August 1806. His obituary in the Gentleman's Magazine (1806, p. 877) paid tribute to the "polished elegance of his manners", mentioned his interest in literature and medicine, and added that "there were few subjects on which he was not intimately well informed".

As well as lands in Betchworth and London, he left shares in the Drury Lane theatre and Covent Garden theatre. His son Charles Henry Bouverie was also a Member of Parliament. His daughter Rebecca married William à Court, 1st Baron Heytesbury

Parliament of Great Britain
Preceded by Viscount Folkestone; William Hussey	Member of Parliament for Salisbury; 1776–1802; With: William Hussey	Succeeded by Viscount Folkestone; William Hussey
