= Gilbert Ralegh =

Member of the Parliament of England for Downton
- In office 5 April 1614 – 7 June 1614 Serving with John Ryves

Personal details
- Born: 1583 Corsley, Wiltshire
- Died: 7 January 1629 (aged 45–46)
- Children: Gilbert Raleigh
- Parent: Carew Raleigh (father)

Gilbert Ralegh also Raleigh (1583 – 7 January 1629) was an English politician who served as a Member of Parliament (MP) for Downton.

== Biography ==
His son Gilbert Raleigh, grandson and great grandson also represented Downton in Parliament.

== See also ==
- List of MPs elected to the English parliament in 1614
