= Sir James Ashe, 2nd Baronet =

English politician (1674–1733)

Sir James Ashe, 2nd Baronet (27 July 1674 – 8 November 1733) was an English baronet and Whig politician who sat in the House of Commons from 1701 to 1705.

== Background ==
Ashe was the eldest surviving son of Sir Joseph Ashe, 1st Baronet, and his wife Mary Wilson, the daughter of Robert Wilson. In 1686, aged only eleven, he succeeded his father as baronet. Ashe owned land in Wiltshire and held shares in the East India Company.

== Career ==
Ashe entered Parliament in 1701, sitting as a Member of Parliament (MP) for Downton, the constituency his father has represented before, until 1705. A year later, Ashe was appointed High Sheriff of Wiltshire. He stood for Downton again in 1708, however unsuccessfully.

== Family ==
In 1698 against his mother's will, he married his cousin Elizabeth Bowyer, daughter of Sir Edmund Bowyer and had by her four daughters and a son. From 1709 they lived separately, but were not divorced. Ashe died intestate at his seat at Twickenham Meadows and was buried at St Margaret's Church, Halstead, Kent. His son having predeceased him, the baronetcy became extinct with Ashe's death. His only surviving daughter, Martha, inherited his estate, and, as a condition of the succession, her husband Joseph Windham – who also eventually became MP for Downton – took on her surname of Ashe in addition to his own by a private act of Parliament, Ashe's Name Act 1733 (7 Geo. 2. c. 18 Pr.).

Parliament of England
Preceded by Carew Raleigh; John Eyre	Member of Parliament for Downton; 1701–1705; With: Carew Raleigh 1701–1702; Sir Charles Duncombe 1702–1705	Succeeded by Sir Charles Duncombe; John Eyre
Baronetage of England
Preceded by Joseph Ashe	Baronet (of Twickenham); 1686–1733	Extinct
