= Thomas White (died 1558) =

English politician

Thomas White (1532/34–1558) was an English politician.

He was a member (MP) of the parliament of England for Downton in 1555 and 1558.

White studied at the Inner Temple. He was survived by his son, the MP for Clitheroe, John White.
