= Henry Fitzjames =

English politician

Henry Fitzjames (c. 1626 – 1685) was an English politician who sat in the House of Commons in 1659.

Fitzjames was the son of Leweston Fitzjames of Leweston, Dorset. He matriculated at Lincoln College, Oxford on 4 March 1642, aged 15. He was a student of the Middle Temple in 1647.

In 1659, Fitzjames was elected Member of Parliament for Haslemere in the Third Protectorate Parliament.

Fitzjames was buried at Bow Chappell on 5 March 1685.

Fitzjames was the brother of Thomas Fitzjames and John Fitzjames.

Parliament of England
Preceded by Not represented in Protectorate parliaments	Member of Parliament for Haslemere; 1659; With: John Flook	Succeeded by Carew Raleigh
