= John Norris (died 1577) =

English politician

John Norris (by 1502 – 30 January 1577) was an English politician.

He was a member (MP) of the parliament of England for Downton in October 1553 and April 1554, for Taunton in November 1554, and for Bodmin in 1558.
