= Thornhill Hall =

House in Thornhill, West Yorkshire, England

Coordinates: 53.666137°N 1.613566°W

Thornhill Hall was a medieval manor house and its ruins survive on a moated island in Rectory Park, Thornhill, West Yorkshire, England. The ruins are listed as grade II. and the moat, with the surrounding grounds, is a scheduled monument.

Excavations carried out between 1964 and 1972 proved that there had been two halls on the island, a 13th-century building with clay-bonded foundation walls, and a later stone H-plan building from about 1450. The later building showed signs of renovation in the 16th century, when a paved floor, plaster walls and a chimney were added.

== History ==
This is the original coat of arms for the Thornhill Family, before they intermarried with the Saviles.

In the reign of Henry III, Thornhill Hall was the seat of the Thornhill family who intermarried with the De Fixbys and Babthorpes in the reigns of Edward I and Edward II. In 1370, in the reign of Edward III, Elizabeth Thornhill, the only child of Simon Thornhill, married Sir Henry Savile extinguishing the family line of Thornhills which subsequently passed down the Savile line. Thornhill Hall became the principal seat of the powerful Savile family.

The Saviles later intermarried with the Calverley family, so that when Sir John Savile died in 1503 in Thornhill, he left provision in his will for his sister Alice, who had married Sir William Calverley.

George Savile was created a baronet in 1611. The Saviles remained here until the English Civil War when in 1643 the house, having been fortified by Sir William Savile, 3rd Baronet, was besieged by the forces of Parliament. In August 1643 troops of Lady Anne Savile, under Captain Thomas Paulden defended the hall against the Parliamentary forces under Col Sir Thomas Fairfax. They were forced to surrender but the hall was accidentally blown up and destroyed after which the family moved their seat to Rufford Abbey in Nottinghamshire.

Some ruins of the hall and the moat remain in Rectory Park. The house had a secret underground passage, that lead to Thornhill Church. just a few hundred yards away from the park. The passage remained until the early 1990s when it was filled in for safety reasons.

== Recent events ==
The Heritage Lottery Fund awarded a grant for an architectural study of the ruins in summer 2011.

== Images of the ruined Hall ==
Part of ruined wall Chimney stack

== Sources ==
- Nuttall, Barbara, History of Thornhill and A Guide to the Church of St. Michael and All Angels Published by Kirklees Cultural Services and Thornhill Parish Church. ISBN 0900746610, 3rd edition, 1995.
- Nuttall, Barbara the Saviles of Thornhill- Life at Thornhill Hall in the reign of Charles I. Published by the Author 1986.
- Cathcart King, David James (1983), Castellarium Anglicanum: An Index and Bibliography of the Castles in England, Wales and the Islands. Volume II: Norfolk–Yorkshire and the Islands, London: Kraus International Publications, ISBN 0-527-50110-7 (page 532)
