= Giles Eyre (MP) =

British politician (1692–1750)

Giles Eyre (c. 1692–1750) was a British politician who sat in the House of Commons from 1715 to 1734.

Eyre was baptised on 27 May 1692, the eldest son of Giles Eyre of Brickworth and his wife Mabel Thayne, daughter of Alexander Thayne of Cowsfield, in Whiteparish, Wiltshire. He was admitted at Lincoln's Inn on 16 June 1715.

Eyre succeeded his uncle, John Eyre, as Member of Parliament for Downton at a by-election on 2 December 1715. He was returned again in 1722 and 1727. His only recorded votes were for the Septennial Bill in 1716 and the Peerage Bill in 1719. He succeeded to the estates on the death of his father in 1734 and did not stand at the 1734 general election. Over subsequent years his political interest declined as he possessed fewer burgages at Downton.

Eyre died unmarried on 7 June 1750.

Parliament of Great Britain
Preceded by Charles Longueville; John Eyre	Member of Parliament for Downton; 1715–1734; With: Charles Longueville 1715-1722; John Verney 1722-1734	Succeeded by Anthony Duncombe; Joseph Windham-Ashe
