= Robert Cecil (Old Sarum MP) =

English politician

Robert Cecil (died August 1657) was an English politician who sat in the House of Commons from 1640 to 1653.

Cecil was the son of William Cecil, 2nd Earl of Salisbury. He was admitted at St John's College, Cambridge in October 1634.

In November 1640, Cecil was elected Member of Parliament for Old Sarum in the Long Parliament. Though not excluded in 1648 he was not recorded as sitting after Pride's Purge.

Parliament of England
Preceded by Edward Herbert; Sir William Howard	Member of Parliament for Old Sarum; 1640–1653; With: Edward Herbert 1640–1641; Sir William Savile, 3rd Baronet 1641–1642; Roger Kirkham 1646; Sir Richard Lucy, 1st Baronet	Succeeded by Not represented in Barebone's Parliament
