= Giles Eyre =

English barrister, member of parliament, judge

Sir Giles Eyre (c. 1635–1695) was an English barrister, member of parliament, and judge.

The son of Giles Eyre and his wife Anne, Eyre attended Winchester College before gaining admittance to Exeter College, Oxford in 1653, then joining Lincoln's Inn on 19 October 1654. While his call to the Bar on 7 November 1661 would normally herald the start of a legal career, by this point Eyre had already been returned as MP for Downton. Joining the opposition under Lord Warton, Eyre laid aside the debate on the Thirty-Nine Articles before abandoning his seat at the 1661 general election in favour of Gilbert Raleigh.

Out of Parliament, Eyre became Deputy Recorder of Salisbury in 1675, receiving a promotion to Recorder in 1681. Replaced in October 1684 when Salisbury's charter was removed, he was reinstated on the return of the charter in October 1688. Following the Glorious Revolution and James II's flight, Eyre was returned for the Salisbury Parliamentary constituency, playing a role in drafting the Bill of Rights 1689; he is thought to be the author of Reflections upon the late great revolution: written by a lay-hand in the country for the satisfaction of some neighbours. On 8 May 1689, he was made a Justice of the King's Bench and a Serjeant-at-Law, receiving a knighthood soon afterwards; he held this position "with great credit" until his death on 2 June 1695.

On 18 November 1662, he had married Dorothy Ryves; by the time of her death on 15 January 1668, she had borne him three sons. Ryves was buried in Whiteparish Church, with an inscription attached to the grave "implying the impossibility of his ever being united to another"; he then married Christabella Wyndham, who on her death was buried in the same grave.

His eldest son Giles was a lunatic, but a younger son John was MP for Downton. Their daughter Dorothy later married Richard Frewin.

A painting of Giles Eyre by Thomas Hudson (1701–1779) was formally in the possession of Cider House Galleries Ltd.

== Bibliography ==
- Foss, Edward (1870). A Biographical Dictionary of the Justices of England (1066 - 1870). Spottiswoode and Company. OCLC 181068114.
- Sainty, John (1993). The Judges of England 1272 -1990: a list of judges of the superior courts. Oxford: Selden Society. OCLC 29670782.

Parliament of Great Britain
Preceded by Thomas Fitzjames	Member of Parliament for Downton; 1660–1661; With: John Verney	Succeeded by Joseph Windham-Ashe
Preceded by Stephen Fox	Member of Parliament for Salisbury; 1689; With: Thomas Hoby	Succeeded by Thomas Pitt
