= Sir Philip Hales, 5th Baronet =

English courtier and Member of Parliament

Sir Philip Hales, 5th Baronet (c. 1735-12 April 1824), of Beakesbourne in Kent, was an English courtier and Member of Parliament.

Hales was the sixth son of Sir Thomas Hales, 3rd Baronet, a long-serving Member of Parliament who held a series of lucrative posts in the Royal Household. He also held a household post, as Groom of the Bedchamber from 1771 until 1812.

In 1774 he stood for election in two constituencies, Canterbury and Downton. At Canterbury he was badly defeated, but Downton was a pocket borough where his brother-in-law Lord Feversham was influential, and he was successful there, though only after petitioning against the original result; he took his seat in February 1775. He later also served as MP for Marlborough. He is not recorded as having spoken in the House in either of his two periods as an MP.

His father's baronetcy had passed to his elder brother, Thomas Pym Hales, in 1762. However, when his brother died on 18 March 1773, his only children were daughters, so Philip as the oldest surviving brother inherited the title. He married Elizabeth Smith, pre 1784, but their only child was also a daughter, Elizabeth. On Philip's death in 1824 he had no male heirs, and the baronetcy became extinct.

Parliament of Great Britain
| Preceded by Thomas Duncombe; Thomas Dummer | Member of Parliament for Downton; 1775–1780; With: John Cooper 1775–1779; Thomas Duncombe 1779; Hon. Bartholomew Bouverie 1779–1780; Robert Shafto 1780 | Succeeded by Robert Shafto; Hon. Henry Seymour-Conway |
| Preceded by The Earl of Courtown; William Woodley | Member of Parliament for Marlborough; 1784–1790; With: The Earl of Courtown | Succeeded by The Earl of Courtown; Thomas Bruce |
Baronetage of England
| Preceded by Thomas Hales | Baronet (of Beakesbourne); 1773–1824 | Extinct |
