= Thomas Dummer =

English Member of Parliament

Thomas Dummer (1739–1781) was an English Member of Parliament for Newport (Isle of Wight) (1765–1768), Yarmouth (Isle of Wight) (1769–1774), Downton in Wiltshire (1774), Wendover in Buckinghamshire (1775–1780) and Lymington in Hampshire (1780–1781).

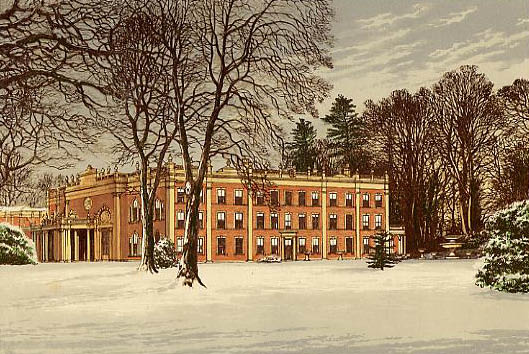
Cranbury Park, near Winchester

== Political career ==
Dummer was the son of Thomas Lee Dummer. On his father's death in October 1765, he succeeded him to the family estate at Cranbury Park near Winchester, Hampshire as well as estates at Weston and Netley, near Southampton and at Horninghold in Leicestershire. He also took his father's parliamentary seat at Newport. In 1768, he lost his seat to Hans Sloane who was in the patronage of the influential Hans Stanley.

In 1769, he became M.P. for nearby Yarmouth (1769–1774). Originally, the election was in favour of William Strode and Jervoise Clarke, but on petition the election was reversed in favour of Dummer and Major General the Hon. George Lane Parker.

In the 1774 election, Dummer stood for election at Downton in Wiltshire. He and Thomas Duncombe were initially declared the victors, but on petition it was decided that they had not been duly elected and their opponents, John Cooper and Sir Philip Hales, were declared elected in their place.

The following year, he was elected to represent Wendover in Buckinghamshire before returning to Hampshire in 1780 as M.P. for Lymington until his death in 1781.

In May 1773, he was elected a Fellow of the Royal Society.

== Cranbury Park ==
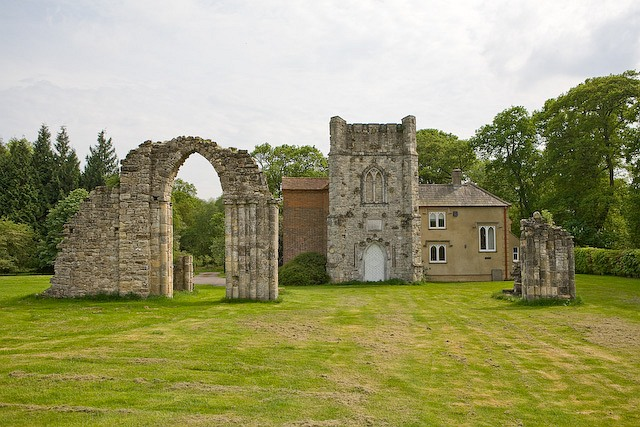
The Castle, Cranbury Park. Built from fragments of the north transept of Netley Abbey moved to Cranbury Park in the 1760s.

On his father's death in 1765, Dummer inherited the family estate at Cranbury Park. In 1770, he purchased the City Cross (also known as the Buttercross) from the Corporation of Winchester, intending to have it re-erected at Cranbury. When his workmen arrived to dismantle the cross, they were prevented from doing so by the people of the city, who "organised a small riot" and they were forced to abandon their task. The agreement with the city was cancelled and Dummer erected a lath and plaster facsimile, which stood in the park for about sixty years before it was destroyed by the weather.

Undaunted by his failure to acquire the City Cross to grace the estate, Dummer turned his attention to the ruins of Netley Abbey, which he also owned, and moved the north transept of the abbey to Cranbury Park, where it can be still be seen as a folly in the gardens of the house (at 51°00′08″N 01°21′49″W). The ruins comprise an arch, the base of a pillar, and a scaled-down gateway tower. The rear of the gateway has been made into a keeper's lodge, and is known to the village of Otterbourne as "the Castle" and is marked as such on the Ordnance Survey map.

Thomas Dummer died without heirs in 1781, leaving his property at Cranbury and Netley and also at Horninghold in Leicestershire first to his widow, Harriet, daughter of Sir Cecil Bishopp, 6th Baronet of Parham, with reversion to his lifelong friend Thomas Chamberlayne. Harriet Dummer then married Thomas Chamberlayne, and after his death she married the artist Nathaniel Dance in 1790. Dance, who was later to become Sir Nathaniel Dance-Holland, Bt., was the brother of George Dance, who had designed the present-day house at Cranbury, built in 1780.

Parliament of Great Britain
Preceded by Thomas Lee Dummer; William Rawlinson Earle	Member of Parliament for Newport (Isle of Wight); 1765–1768; With: William Rawlinson Earle	Succeeded by John Eames; Hans Sloane
Preceded by William Strode; Jervoise Clarke	Member of Parliament for Yarmouth (Isle of Wight); 1769–1774; With: Major General the Hon. George Lane Parker	Succeeded by Edward Meux Worsley; Jervoise Clarke Jervoise
Preceded by James Hayes; Thomas Duncombe	Member of Parliament for Downton; 1774–1775; With: Thomas Duncombe	Succeeded by John Cooper; Sir Philip Hales
Preceded by Joseph Bullock; Henry Drummond	Member of Parliament for Wendover; 1775–1780; With: Henry Drummond	Succeeded by Richard Smith; John Mansell Smith
Preceded by Edward Morant; Henry Goodricke	Member of Parliament for Lymington; 1780–1781; With: Captain Harry Burrard	Succeeded by Edward Gibbon; Captain Harry Burrard
