= Whiteparish Common =

Protected area in Wiltshire, England

Coordinates: 51.00852°N 1.63791°W

Whiteparish Common (grid reference SU255233) is a 64.5 hectare biological Site of Special Scientific Interest near Whiteparish, Wiltshire, England, notified in 1965.

== Sources ==
- Natural England citation sheet for the site (accessed 25 May 2023)
