= Robert Warner (MP, born 1510) =

16th-century English politician

Robert Warner (1510–1575) was an English politician.

He was a member (MP) of the parliament of England for Chippenham in 1545, Wilton in 1547, Downton in March 1553, and Bossiney in 1559.
