= Edward Bouverie (1760–1824) =

British politician

The Honourable Bartholemew Bouverie

Member of Parliament for Downton
- In office 1796–1803 Serving with Sir William Scott, Viscount Folkestone, John Ward
- Preceded by: Bartholomew Bouverie; William Scott
- Succeeded by: The Lord de Blaquiere; John Ward

Personal details
- Born: 20 September 1760
- Died: 30 December 1824 (aged 64)
- Relations: Jacob Pleydell-Bouverie, 2nd Earl of Radnor (half-brother); William Henry Bouverie (brother); Bartholomew Bouverie (brother); Sir John Alleyne, 1st Baronet (uncle)
- Parent(s): William Bouverie, 1st Earl of Radnor; Rebecca Alleyne

Edward Bouverie (20 September 1760 – 30 December 1824) was an English politician.

== Early life ==
Bouverie was born on 20 September 1760. He was the third son of William Bouverie, 1st Earl of Radnor and, his second wife, Rebecca Alleyne, daughter of John Alleyne, of Four Hills, Barbados, and sister of Sir John Alleyne, 1st Baronet. He was the half-brother of Jacob Pleydell-Bouverie, 2nd Earl of Radnor, and the full brother of William Henry Bouverie and Bartholomew Bouverie.

His paternal grandparents were Jacob Bouverie, 1st Viscount Folkestone and Mary Clarke (the daughter of Bartholomew Clarke, merchant of Hardingstone and Mary (née Young), sister and sole heir to Hitch Younge MP).

In 1773, at age 13, he was painted by Thomas Gainsborough as a youth in the style of Anthony van Dyck. Bouverie was educated at Harrow in c. 1769 and St Alban Hall, Oxford in 1778, before earning his BA from Corpus Christi College, Oxford in 1781.

== Career ==
Bouverie was a Groom of the Bedchamber to the Prince of Wales (later George IV) from 1787 to 1795. In 1794, he was wounded in a duel with the 4th Earl of Tankerville who reportedly "resented his attentions to his daughter Lady Anne Bennet."

He served as Commissioner of Transports from June 1803 to January 1806 and Commissioner of the Navy from July 1805 until his death. Upon the Prince of Wales' ascension to the throne in 1820 as King George IV, Bouverie became a Gentleman of the Privy Chamber, holding that tile until his death in 1824.

Bouverie was returned as a Member of Parliament for Downton from 1796 until 1803.

== Personal life ==
On 24 May 1782, Bouverie married Lady Catherine Murray (1760–1783), the eldest daughter of John Murray, 4th Earl of Dunmore and Lady Charlotte Stewart (eldest daughter of the 6th Earl of Galloway). She died, without surviving children, on 7 July 1783.

After her death, he married Arabella Ogle (1762–1855), daughter of Admiral Sir Chaloner Ogle, 1st Baronet and Hester Thomas (daughter of John Thomas, Bishop of Winchester), on 20 December 1785. Like his first marriage, Arabella had one son who died young.

Bouverie died on 30 December 1824 at age 64, with no children. After his death, his widow remarried Robert Talbot, son of l Margaret Talbot, 1st Baroness Talbot.

Parliament of Great Britain
Preceded by Hon. Bartholomew Bouverie; Sir William Scott	Member of Parliament for Downton; 1796–1800; With: Sir William Scott	Succeeded by Parliament of the United Kingdom
Parliament of the United Kingdom
Preceded by Parliament of Great Britain	Member of Parliament for Downton; 1800–1803; With: Sir William Scott (1800–1801); Viscount Folkestone (1801–1802); Hon. John Ward (1802–1803)	Succeeded by The Lord de Blaquiere; Hon. John Ward
