= Anthony Duncombe, 1st Baron Feversham =

British landowner and politician

Arms of Duncombe: Per chevron engrailed gules and argent, three talbot's heads erased counterchanged

Anthony Duncombe, 1st Baron Feversham (c. 1695 – 18 June 1763) was a British landowner and politician who sat in the House of Commons from 1727 until 1747 when he was raised to the peerage as Baron Feversham.

Duncombe was the son of Anthony Duncombe and Jane Cornwallis, daughter of Frederick Cornwallis, younger son of Frederick Cornwallis, 1st Baron Cornwallis. In 1721 he succeeded to half of the enormous estates of his uncle, Sir Charles Duncombe. The same year he was returned as Member of Parliament for Salisbury at a by-election on 6 May 1721. He retained the seat in the general elections of 1722 and 1727. At the 1734 general election he was returned unopposed as MP for Downton instead and again in 1741. He vacated his seat in 1747 when he was raised to the peerage as Lord Feversham, Baron of Downton, in the County of Wilts.

Lord Feversham married three times. Firstly to Margaret Verney, daughter of George Verney, 12th Baron Willoughby de Broke, in 1716. There were no children from this marriage. She died in 1755 and was buried in Downton, Wiltshire with a memorial sculpted by Peter Scheemakers.

After her death in October 1755 he married Frances Bathurst, daughter of Peter Bathurst, in 1756. They had one child, Frances Duncombe (1757–1827). Lady Feversham died shortly after the birth of her daughter. Lord Feversham's third marriage was to Anne Hales, daughter of Sir Thomas Hales, 3rd Baronet, in 1758. They had one daughter, Anne Duncombe (d. 1829), who married her step-brother Jacob Pleydell-Bouverie, 2nd Earl of Radnor. Lord Feversham died in June 1763. As he had no sons the barony died with him. Lady Feversham married as her second husband William de Bouverie, 1st Earl of Radnor. She died in June 1795. The barony was revived in 1826 in favour of Lord Feversham's kinsman Charles Duncombe, a descendant of Feversham's aunt Ursula Duncombe, who had inherited the other half of Sir Charles Duncombe's fortune.

Parliament of Great Britain
Preceded by Francis Swanton; Edmund Lambert	Member of Parliament for Salisbury; 1721–1734; With: Edmund Lambert 1721–1722; Francis Kenton 1722–1727; Thomas Lewis 1727–1734	Succeeded by Peter Bathurst; Henry Hoare
Preceded by Giles Eyre; John Verney	Member of Parliament for Downton; 1734–1747; With: Joseph Windham-Ashe 1734–1741, 1742–1746; John Verney 1741–1742; George Proctor 1746–1747	Succeeded by George Proctor; George Lyttelton
Peerage of Great Britain
New creation	Baron Feversham; 1747–1763	Extinct
