= Robert Turner (MP) =

English politician

Robert Turner (fl. 1597 – 1601) was an English politician.

He was a member (MP) of the parliament of England for Downton in 1597 and for Old Sarum in 1601.
