= John Cooper (died 1779) =

British politician

John Cooper (c. 1726–1779), was a British politician who sat in the House of Commons between 1775 and 1779.

Cooper was the son of Thomas Cooper of Salisbury and his second wife Sarah Priaulx. He matriculated at Queen’s College, Oxford on 13 March 1744, aged 17. He became a clothier in Salisbury and married Rachel Poore, daughter of Edward Poore who was an MP for Salisbury and Downton. In 1767 he was Mayor of Salisbury.

Cooper followed his father-in-law in his political aspirations. In July 1774 he declared he was going to stand for Parliament at Salisbury. However, in the general election of 1774 he stood as Member of Parliament for Downton. He was defeated, but was subsequently seated on petition. He voted regularly with the Opposition but does not appear to have spoken in the House.

Cooper died on 7 August 1779.

== Sources ==
- History of the Cases of Controverted Elections: Which Were Tried and Determined During the First and Second Sessions of the Fourteenth Parliament of Great Britain, 15 & 16 Geo. III. Sylvester Douglas Baron Glenbervie L. Hansard, 1802 P207-239

Parliament of Great Britain
Preceded by Thomas Duncombe; Thomas Dummer	Member of Parliament for Downton; 1775–1779; With: Sir Philip Hales	Succeeded by Thomas Duncombe; Sir Philip Hales
