= Gilbert Raleigh =

Member of the Parliament of England for Downton
- In office 17 May 1661 – 15 April 1675

Personal details
- Born: 1622
- Died: 1675 (aged 52–53)
- Relations: Carew Raleigh
- Parent: Gilbert Ralegh (father)

Gilbert Raleigh also Raleigh (1622 – 1675) was an English politician who served as a Member of Parliament (MP) for Downton.

== Biography ==
His father, son and grandson also represented Downton in Parliament.

== See also ==
- List of MPs elected to the English Parliament in 1661
