= Thomas Fitzjames =

English politician

Thomas Fitzjames (c. 1624 – 1705) was an English politician who sat in the House of Commons in 1659 and 1660.

Fitzjames was the son of Leweston Fitzjames of Leweston, Dorset. He matriculated at Lincoln College, Oxford on 25 January 1639, aged 16. He was called to the bar at Middle Temple in 1649.

In 1659, Fitzjames was elected Member of Parliament for Downton in the Third Protectorate Parliament. He was then of Nurfland. In April 1660 he was re-elected MP for Downton in the Convention Parliament but as there was a double return, his election was declared void on 9 May.

Fitzjames was the brother of Henry Fitzjames and John Fitzjames.

Parliament of England
Preceded by Not represented in Protectorate parliaments	Member of Parliament for Downton; 1659; With: William Coles	Succeeded by Not represented in restored Rump
