= William Hacket =

English puritan

William Hacket, or Hackett (died 1591), was an English puritan who claimed to be a messiah. He called for the removal of Queen Elizabeth I. He was executed in London after being found guilty of treason.

== Early life ==
Hacket was born at Oundle, Northamptonshire. He had no formal education and was illiterate, finding work as a serving-man in the households of a Mr. Hussey, Sir Thomas Tresham, and Sir Charles Morrison, all Northamptonshire gentry. He married Anna Moreton, the widow of a wealthy farmer, and became a maltster. He had a reputation for riotous living and violence, as reflected in an anecdote which claimed that, during a quarrel in an alehouse with a schoolmaster called Freckingham, Hacket bit off and ate his opponent's nose.

== Conversion and preaching ==
Later in his life, Hacket underwent a type of religious conversion. He had been born a Catholic, but rapidly developed an uncontrollable loathing for Roman Catholicism, turning to Presbyterianism instead. An acquaintance in Oundle, Giles Wigginton, became his disciple. Business partners at first, they went on to become leaders of a Protestant splinter group which bordered on the threshold of separatism.

Travelling to York, Hacket announced that he was sent there by God to prepare the way for the Messiah, only to be "well whipped" and banished from the city; he received a similar reception in Leicester. Subsequently, he preached around the villages of Northamptonshire against Queen Elizabeth and her chief councilors, for which he was arrested and thrown in Northampton gaol. He was released after many weeks' imprisonment, on giving a bond to come up for judgment when called upon.

== London and treason ==
Around Easter 1591, Hacket travelled to London at Wigginton's suggestion, staying at a lodging house outside Smithfield. Wigginton introduced him to Edmund Coppinger, who held a minor post in the royal household, and had declared that he had been moved by God to warn the queen to reform herself, her family, the commonwealth, and church. Coppinger soon convinced himself and a friend, Henry Arthington, a Yorkshire gentleman, that Hacket had an "extraordinary calling", and had in fact come from heaven, after anointment by the Holy Ghost, to inaugurate a new era on earth. Hacket also claimed some kind of invulnerability. People came to his lodgings to hear his prayers, prophecies and "ohes, loud sighes and groninges"; Member of Parliament Job Throckmorton compared his utterings to a "wildgoose chase" with "neither head nor foote, rime nor reason".

Coppinger, his "prophet of mercy" and Arthington, "prophet of judgement", proved credulous disciples; they talked publicly of dethroning the Queen and putting Hacket in her place, of abolishing the episcopacy of the Church of England and establishing in every congregation a Presbyterian style of 'eldership' or consistory of doctor, pastor, and lay elders. Christopher Hatton, the Lord-chancellor. They also spoke of other ministers of state to be removed from office and replaced by associates of the conspirators, among whom were mentioned William Davison and other persons reputed to be of puritan predilections. They also scattered leaflets and letters about London foretelling the coming changes. Hacket defaced the queen's arms which were set up in his lodgings in Knightrider Street, and mutilated a picture of her with a bodkin.

On 19 July 1591, Coppinger and Arthington left Hacket in his lodgings near "Broken Wharf" to Cheapside, and from the top of an empty cart preached that William Hacket was the Christ returned to judge the earth and establish the gospel in Europe. They stated they were his two prophets, sent by God as witnesses and repentance would ensure mercy from heaven. Terrible judgement and eternal punishment was promised against those who would not believe and repent. They also spoke out against the Queen and her ministers. Crowds gathered, and a riot ensued, forcing the fanatics to take refuge in the Mermaid Tavern. The privy council, on hearing of their conduct, had them and Hacket arrested, and they were imprisoned in Bridewell Palace.

== Trial and execution ==
Hacket was brought to a trial for treason on 26 July at the Sessions House near Newgate. He pleaded guilty to a charge of declaring that Queen Elizabeth was not queen of England, but pleaded not guilty to a second charge that he had defaced the queen's picture. His behaviour at and after the trial suggests that, by this time, he was not of sound mind. He was labelled as a witch, a visionary and a raving lunatic.

He was condemned to death, and executed near the Cross in Cheapside on 28 July 1591 by being hanged, drawn and quartered. On the way to the scaffold he is said to have insulted the clergyman accompanying him and uttered "execrable blasphemy" to the last. Of his fellow conspirators, Coppinger starved himself to death in Bridewell, though Arthington, claiming that he had been the victim of witchcraft, and giving a penitent apology, was released in the following year.

A Life, Arraignment, Judgement, and Execution of William Hacket was licensed for publication to Robert Bourne on 28 July 1591. No copy seems to have survived. John Strype gave a summary of a Conspiracy for pretended Reformation (1592), which details Hacket, Coppinger, and Arthington's activities.

== Aftermath ==
Civil disorder and popular uprisings were a real threat in this period due to harsh economic conditions, social divisions, corruption and political intrigues. Although Hacket and his followers did excite some public interest, there was no corresponding popular support for his views.

At this time, Puritan leaders were being tried for sedition and imprisoned; enemies attempted to use the Puritan affiliation of the Hacket rebels as the basis for a link with Thomas Cartwright and the wider Puritan faction, and undermine its influence. However, there was never any evidence to suggest foreknowledge; in fact, Cartwright had considered the insurrectionists to be deluded and disordered in mind, to be treated as such, and had suggested imprisonment as the correct course of action. In 1596, Cartwright, having already incurred the Government's displeasure, and been imprisoned for another matter, issued a written defence of his actions in answer to scurrilous accusations concerning the Hacket rebellion.

== See also ==
- List of messiah claimants
- Messiah complex
