= Francis Kenton =

Francis Kenton (c. 1689 - 1755) was the member of the Parliament of Great Britain for Salisbury for the parliament of 1722 to 1727.
