= Edmund Coppinger =

Edmund Coppinger (died 1592) was an English puritan. He was a supporter of controversialist William Hacket.

He is described by Richard Cosin as "descended of a good house and linage, and one of her Maiestie's sworne servants, but a younger brother, having no great livelihood". With a Yorkshire gentleman, Henry Arthington, he championed the claims of the notorious religious enthusiast, William Hacket, who had a wild scheme for abolishing bishops and deposing Queen Elizabeth I. Hacket proclaimed himself to be the Messiah, and Coppinger joined Arthington in holding a demonstration in Cheapside to support the impostor's claim. The three men were thrown into prison. Hacket was hanged on 28 July 1592; Coppinger died eight days afterwards from voluntary starvation; Arthington repented of his errors and was pardoned. The affair caused considerable excitement.

== Sources ==
This article incorporates text from a publication now in the public domain: Stephen, Leslie, ed. (1887). "Coppinger, Edmund". Dictionary of National Biography. Vol. 12. London: Smith, Elder & Co.
