= Giuseppe Filippo Liberati Marchi =

Italian painter

Portrait by Joshua Reynolds, 1753

Giuseppe Filippo Liberati Marchi (1735 – 2 April 1808) was an Italian-English painter and engraver.

== Biography ==
Giuseppe Filippo Liberati Marchi was born in the Trastevere quarter of Rome. At the age of fifteen he came under the notice of Sir Joshua Reynolds, whom he accompanied to England in 1752. He studied in the St. Martin's Lane Academy, and became Reynolds's most trusted assistant, being employed to set his palette, paint his draperies, make copies, and pose for pictures, among other tasks. The first picture painted by Reynolds when he settled in London was a portrait of young Marchi in a turban, which was much admired at the time, and engraved by Jonathan Spilsbury in 1761; it is now the property of the Royal Academy.

Marchi did not reside with Reynolds until 1764. Known as a copyist, but unsuccessful in original portraiture, he tried at one time to establish himself at Swansea, but soon returned to the service of Sir Joshua, with whom he remained until the painter's death. Subsequently he was employed in cleaning and restoring paintings.

Marchi died in London on 2 April 1808, aged 73.

== Works ==
Marchi took up mezzotint engraving, and from 1766 to 1775 exhibited engravings, as well as an occasional picture with the Society of Artists, of which he was a member. His plates included portraits of Miss Oliver (1767), Miss Cholmondeley (1768), Mrs. Bouverie and Mrs. Crewe (1770), Oliver Goldsmith (1770), Mrs. Hartley (1773), and George Colman (1773), all after Reynolds, and that of Princess Czartoriska (1777), from a picture by himself.
