= Joseph Windham-Ashe =

Ashe's Name Act 1733
- Act of Parliament
- Parliament of Great Britain
- Long title: An Act to enable Joseph Wyndham Esquire, and his Issue Male, to take and use the Surname of Ashe, pursuant to the last Will and Testament of Dame Mary Ashe.
- Citation: 7 Geo. 2. c. 18 Pr.
- Territorial extent: Great Britain

Dates
- Royal assent: 16 April 1734
- Commencement: 17 January 1734 (Note: Start of session.)

Status: Current legislation

Joseph Windham-Ashe (1683–30 July 1746) of Twickenham, Middlesex, was an English merchant and politician who sat in the House of Commons between 1734 and 1746.

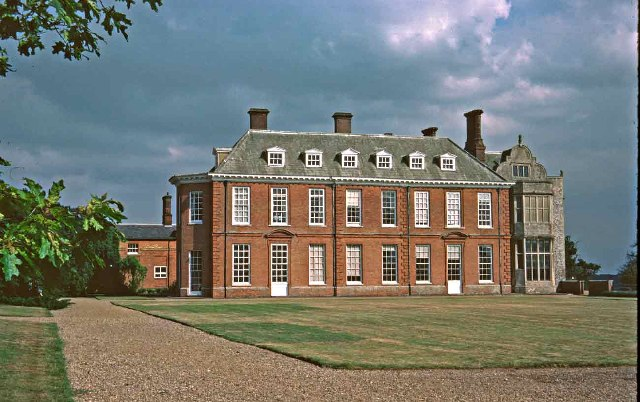
Felbrigg Hall, west wing, circa 1680

Windham-Ashe was born Joseph Windham the son of William Windham of Felbrigg Hall, Norfolk and his wife Katherine Ashe. He was the brother of William and Ashe. He was related on his father’s side to the Windhams of Norfolk and through his mother and wife to the Ashes of Heytesbury. From about 1718, he was cashier to salt commissioners, holding the post until 1734. He married his cousin Martha Ashe, the only surviving daughter and heiress of Sir James Ashe, 2nd Baronet, his mother's brother, in 1715. He assumed the name Ashe by a private act of Parliament, Ashe's Name Act 1733 (7 Geo. 2. c. 18 Pr.) on his wife’s succession to her father’s property at Twickenham Meadows, Cambridge Park, Twickenham and elsewhere in 1733. Windham Ashe enlarged the house (later known as Cambridge House) and built the west front.

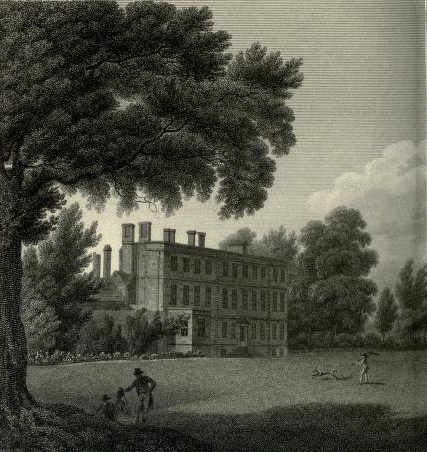
Twickenham Meadows, engraving by John Landseer after John Webber (detail)

The Ashe inheritance included a lease of the manor of Downton, which held the appointment of the returning officer of Downton. Windham-Ashe was returned unopposed as Member of Parliament for Downton as a government supporter at the 1734 British general election. At the 1741 British general election, he stood down at Downton for John Verney, but was unsuccessful when he stood on the government interest for Bishop's Castle instead. When Verney died, Ashe was returned again for Downton at a by-election on 4 January 1742. Soon afterwards, he transferred the lease of the manor to Anthony Duncombe. Windham-Ashe was put into custody of the serjeant at arms on 18 January 1743 for defaulting on a call of the House. He continued to support the government.

Windham-Ashe died on 30 July 1746 leaving one daughter Mary, who married John Windham-Bowyer in September 1734. After his death Martha stayed at the house for three years until her death in 1749, when it was bought by Valens Comyn MP for Hindon.

== Bibliography ==
- Ashe family

Parliament of Great Britain
Preceded by Giles Eyre; John Verney	Member of Parliament for Downton; 1734–1741; With: Anthony Duncombe	Succeeded by John Verney; Anthony Duncombe
Preceded by John Verney; Anthony Duncombe	Member of Parliament for Downton; 1742–1746; With: Anthony Duncombe	Succeeded by George Proctor; Anthony Duncombe
