= John Verney (judge) =

British barrister, judge and politician

Sir John Verney KC PC
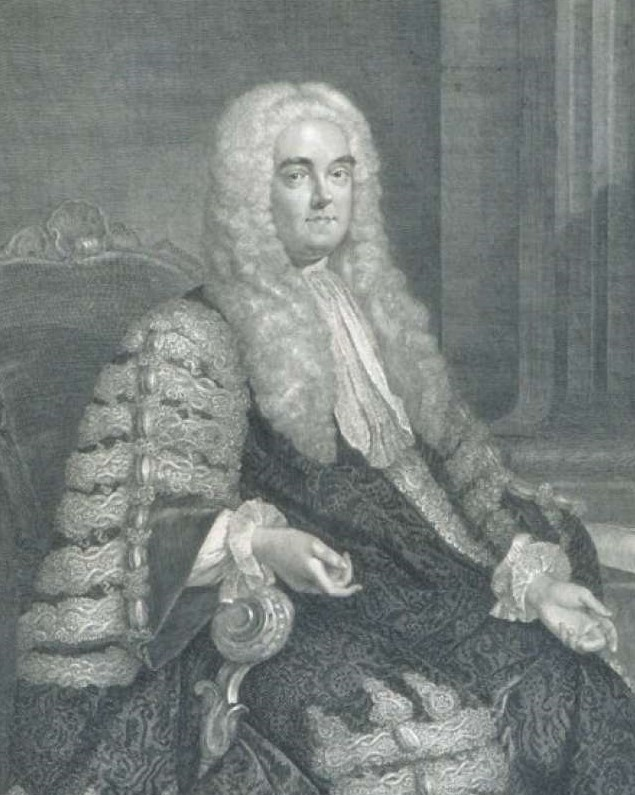

Attorney General to the Queen Consort
- In office May 1729 – 20 November 1737

Chief Justice of Cheshire
- In office 1732–1738
- Preceded by: John Willes
- Succeeded by: Matthew Skinner

Master of the Rolls
- In office 9 October 1738 – 1741
- Preceded by: Sir Joseph Jekyll
- Succeeded by: Sir John Strange

Personal details
- Born: 23 October 1699 Brasted, Kent
- Died: 5 August 1741 (aged 41)
- Party: Tories
- Relations: George Verney, 12th Baron Willoughby de Broke
- Children: John, 14th Baron Willoughby de Broke
- Profession: Barrister, Judge, Politician

Sir John Verney, KC PC (23 October 1699 – 5 August 1741) of Compton Verney, Warwickshire, was a British barrister, judge and Tory and then Whig politician who sat in the House of Commons from between 1722 and 1741.

== Early life ==
Verney was born in Brasted, Kent on 23 October 1699, the fifth son of George Verney, 12th Baron Willoughby de Broke and his wife Margaret Heath, daughter of Sir John Heath of Brasted. He matriculated at New College, Oxford on 11 October 1714, aged 15, and was admitted at the Middle Temple in 1715. He was called to the Bar ex gratia in 1721. On 16 September 1724 he married Abigail Harley, the daughter of Sir Edward Harley, the younger brother of Queen Anne's Tory minister, Robert Harley, created Earl of Oxford.

== Career ==
In an attempt to gain contacts for his work as a barrister, Verney decided to stand for Parliament. At the 1722 British general election he was returned as Tory Member of Parliament (MP) for Downton with the help of his brother-in-law, Anthony Duncombe. He spoke on 22 January 1724 against the Government of the Whig Prime Minister Robert Walpole on a motion for maintaining the existing strength of the army. In 1726 he switched sides, and supported the government on a similar motion on 28 January 1726. At the end of the year he was rewarded by being appointed a Welsh judge as 2nd justice of Brecon circuit. He was returned as MP after the consequential by-election, and a few days he spoke for the Government on an opposition motion about sending a fleet to the Baltic. In 1727 he became a King's Counsel. At the 1727 British general election he stood again at Downton and also at Radnor as a backup. He was unsuccessful at Radnor, but was returned again for Downton. In 1728 he was made a Bencher at Lincoln's Inn, having switched Inns some time earlier.

Verney spoke in a financial debate on 4 March 1728 but he apparently displayed gross ignorance in a ridiculous contribution. In May 1729 he was made Attorney General to the Queen Consort, Queen Caroline. In 1730 and 1731 he spoke in support of the Hessians and against a petition to abolish the East India Company's monopoly. He resigned from his Welsh post in 1732 because of ill-health, but accepted an appointment as Chief Justice of Cheshire. On 8 February 1733 he opposed the receipt of a petition from the York Buildings Society stating that ‘the law would redress any abuses of this nature’, but the House did not take his advice.

At the 1734 British general election Verney stood aside at Downton as the seat was taken by Duncombe for himself. He was again defeated at Radnor and so was out of Parliament. After the death of Sir Joseph Jekyll on 19 August 1738, Verney applied to succeed him as Master of the Rolls, and was accepted after the position was turned down by Sir John Strange. He took office on 9 October 1738, and was sworn in on 12 October. After a few years, his ill-health made it impossible to continue as Master of the Rolls, and he offered his resignation to the Lord Chancellor in early 1741. At the 1741 British general election he was returned again for Downton, but died before Parliament met.

== Death and legacy ==
Verney died on 5 August 1741 leaving a son and two daughters. His son John, succeeded his childless uncle (Verney's brother) as Baron Willoughby de Broke.

== Bibliography ==
- Foss, Edward (1870). A Biographical Dictionary of the Justices of England (1066 - 1870). Spottiswoode and Company.

Parliament of Great Britain
Preceded by Charles Longueville	Member of Parliament for Downton; 1722–1734; With: Anthony Duncombe	Succeeded by Anthony Duncombe; Joseph Windham-Ashe
Preceded by Joseph Windham-Ashe	Member of Parliament for Downton; 1741; With: Giles Eyre	Succeeded by Anthony Duncombe; Joseph Windham-Ashe
Legal offices
Preceded by John Willes	Chief Justice of Cheshire; 1732–1738	Succeeded by Matthew Skinner
Preceded by Sir John Trevor	Master of the Rolls; 1738–1741	Succeeded by William Fortescue
