= Charles Henry Bouverie =

English politician

Member of Parliament for Downton
- In office 1812-1813

Member of Parliament for Dorchester
- In office 1811-1812

Personal details
- Born: 1782
- Died: 27 May 1836 (aged 53–54) Wimbledon, London, England
- Parent: William Henry Bouverie (father)
- Relatives: William Bouverie (grandfather)

Charles Henry Bouverie (1782 – 27 May 1836), of Betchworth House, Surrey was an English politician.

== Biography ==
Bouverie was born in 1782 the son of William Henry Bouverie who was a Member of Parliament for Salisbury.

He was a Member (MP) of the Parliament of England for Dorchester 1811 to 1812 and Downton from 1812 to 1813.

Bouverie died on 27 May 1836 in Wimbledon.
