= William Dodington (MP for Downton) =

English Member of Parliament

Sir William Dodington (c. 1598 – 1624), of Breamore, Hampshire, was an English Member of Parliament. He was a Member (MP) of the Parliament of England for Downton in 1624.
