= Downton (constituency) =

Former parliamentary constituency in the United Kingdom

- Former borough constituency for the House of Commons

1295–1832
- Seats: Two

Downton was a parliamentary borough in Wiltshire, which elected two Members of Parliament (MPs) to the House of Commons from 1295 until 1832, when it was abolished by the Great Reform Act.

== History ==
The borough consisted of part of the parish of Downton, a small town six miles south of Salisbury. By the 19th century, only about half of the town was within the boundaries of the borough, and the more prosperous section was excluded: at the 1831 census the borough had 166 houses and a tax assessment of £70, whereas the whole town consisted of 314 houses, and was assessed at £273.

Downton was a burgage borough, meaning that the right to vote rested solely with the freeholders of 100 specified properties or "burgage tenements"; it was not necessary to be resident on the tenement, or even in the borough, to exercise this right. Indeed, some of the tenements could not realistically be occupied, and one was in the middle of a watercourse. At the time of the Great Reform Act, The Earl of Radnor (who supported the Reform) told the House of Lords that he owned 99 of the 100 tenements — which, of course, gave him absolute power in choosing both the borough's MPs. Earlier, in the 18th century, the Duncombe family had been the owners.

Corruption was rife at 18th century elections in Downton, and the House of Commons at one point proposed to "throw it into the hundred", that is to extend the boundaries to include the whole of the Hundred of Downton and to abolish the restrictive franchise — one of the earliest examples of such a proposal being debated; however, the proposal was not adopted.

Although there was supposedly a property qualification to become an MP (borough MPs were required to have an annual income of at least £300 derived from the ownership of land), this was routinely ignored or evaded, and Downton offers a rare example of an English election being re-run because the victor lacked the qualification. On 11 June 1826 the poet Southey was elected MP for Downton, but he did not take his seat when Parliament assembled in July, and in November wrote to the Speaker: "Having while I was on the continent been, without my knowledge, elected a burgess to serve in the present Parliament for the borough of Downton, it has become my duty to take the earliest opportunity of requesting you to inform the honourable House that I am not qualified to take a seat therein, inasmuch as I am not possessed of such an estate as is required by the Act passed in the ninth year of Queen Anne." A by-election had to be held to replace him.

By 1831 the parish of Downton had a population of around 450, too small to retain representation after the Reform Act, and yet in the original Reform Bill it was proposed that Downton should lose only one of its two members, its boundaries being extended to include Fordingbridge, over the county border in Hampshire. However, the Earl of Radnor pushed for its complete disfranchisement as it would be too difficult to make even an extended borough free of the influence of himself and his family. (He also made it a condition of becoming MP for Downton that its members should vote for its abolition.) As this abolition of a Whig-owned borough was useful to the Whig government in demonstrating their even-handedness, they backed an amendment to move Downton into Schedule A, the list of boroughs that were to lose both seats; but the government majority in the Commons fell to 30 in the vote on the amendment, the narrowest of all the votes on the details of the eventual Act.

The Reform Act being passed, Downton ceased to be represented from the 1832 general election, those of its residents who were qualified voting instead in the county constituency of Southern Wiltshire.

== Members of Parliament ==
=== MPs 1295–1640 ===
Parliament	First member	Second member
1295–1298	John Spede	Richard de la Sale
1298–1300	Reginald Dt. Aula	John Whitthorn
1300–1304	Roger de Portsmouth	Wh. Leicester
1304–1306	Roger le Large	John Ervye
1306	John de Downton	
1306–1311	Randolph Lavering	John Spede
1311–1312	Robert le Wryere	William Osgod
1312–1313	John le Cove	John Arny
1313–1314	Walter Nymethalf	Roger de Portsmouth
1314–1318	Nicholas de Mareshal	William de Whytham
1318–1319	William Rotarius	Henry le Drapier
1319–1323	? Norreys	Walter le Whlere
1323–1326	John Curtoys	
1323–1325	Nicholas Laveryng	
1325–1326	Nicholas de Cove	
1326–1328	Edward de Tarante	Nicholas de Becklesnade
1328	Henricus le Meyre	
1328–1329	Stephanus de Regate	Edwardus Taraunt
1360–1361	Ricardus Whithorn	Johannes Meyer
1362–1364	Johannes Dryewods	Willielmus Benert
1364–1365	Willielmus Wartier	Johannes Willeymn
1413 (May)	Johannes Brut	Thomas Knyf
1441–1442	Johannes Whitesmede	Ralph Legh
1446–1447	Johannes Brekenok	Johannes Bailey
1448–1449	Johannes Lawley	Andreas Sparowe
1449–1450	Johannes Rokes	Robertus Tilleney
1450–1452	Walterus Bergn	Johannes Wynge
1452–1455	Ralph Legh	Thomas Wells
1455–1459	Edwardus Asshewell	Willielmus Brigg
1459	Johannes Wolfe	Thomas Danvers
1467	Thomas Wells	Ralph Legh
1472–1477	Thomas Danvers	Richard Jaye
1529	Nicholas Hare	William Whorwood
1547	William Morice	William Green
1553 (Mar)	William Thomas	Robert Warner
1553 (Oct)	John Norris	John Bekynsale
1554 (Apr)	James Bassit	John Norris
1554 (Nov)	John Bekynsale	William Barnes
1555	Henry White	Thomas White
1558	Thomas White	Thomas Girdler
1559	John Story	Thomas Girdler
1562	Tristram Matthew	Henry Kingsmill
1571	George Penruddocke	Sir Henry Cocke
1572	William Darrell	Edward St Loe
1584	Thomas Wilkes	Richard Cosin
1586	Thomas Gorges	Thomas Wilkes
1588	Richard Cosin	Lawrence Tompson
1593	John Goldwell	Thomas Willoughby
1597	Robert Turner	George Powell
1601	Thomas Penruddock	Sir Edward Barker
1604	Carew Raleigh	William Stockman
1614	Gilbert Ralegh	John Ryves
1621	Carew Raleigh	Thomas Hinton
1624	Sir Clipsby Crew	Sir William Dodington
1625	Sir Clipsby Crew	Edward Herbert
1626	Edward Herbert	Sir William Tremhall
1628–1629	Sir Benjamin Rudyerd	Edward Herbert
1629–1640	No Parliaments summoned	

=== MPs 1640–1832 ===
Year	First member	First party	Second member	Second party
Apr 1640	Sir Edward Griffin	Royalist	William Eyre	
November 1640	Sir Edward Griffin	Royalist	Seat vacant pending resolution of disputed election	
February 1644	Griffin disabled from sitting - seat vacant		Seat vacant pending resolution of disputed election	
1645	Alexander Thistlethwaite		Seat vacant pending resolution of disputed election	
December 1648	Thistlethwaite excluded in Pride's Purge - seat vacant		Seat vacant pending resolution of disputed election	
1653	Downton was unrepresented in the Barebones Parliament and the First and Second Parliaments of the Protectorate			
January 1659	Colonel Thomas Fitzjames		William Coles	
May 1659	One seat vacant		Vacant pending resolution of disputed election	
January 1660	One seat vacant		Sir Anthony Ashley Cooper	
April 1660	Thomas Fitzjames		William Coles	
May 1660	Giles Eyre		John Elliott	
1661	Gilbert Raleigh		Walter Bockland	
1670	Gilbert Raleigh		Sir Joseph Ashe	
1675	Henry Eyre		Sir Joseph Ashe	
February 1679	Maurice Bocland		Sir Joseph Ashe	
1685	Maurice Bocland		Sir Charles Raleigh	
1695	Charles Duncombe	Tory	Sir Charles Raleigh	
February 1698	Maurice Bocland		Sir Charles Raleigh	
May 1698	Maurice Bocland		John Eyre	Whig
July 1698	Carew Raleigh		John Eyre	Whig
1701	Carew Raleigh		Sir James Ashe, 2nd Bt	Whig
1702	Sir Charles Duncombe	Tory	Sir James Ashe, 2nd Bt	Whig
1705	Sir Charles Duncombe	Tory	John Eyre	Whig
1711	Thomas Duncombe	Tory	John Eyre	Whig
1713	John Sawyer		John Eyre	Whig
January 1715	Charles Longueville	Tory	John Eyre	Whig
December 1715 by-election	Charles Longueville	Tory	Giles Eyre	
1722	John Verney		Giles Eyre	
1734	Anthony Duncombe		Joseph Windham-Ashe	
1741	Anthony Duncombe		John Verney	
1742 by-election	Anthony Duncombe		Joseph Windham-Ashe	
November 1746 by-election	Anthony Duncombe		George Proctor	
June 1747	George Lyttelton		George Proctor	
December 1747 by-election	Richard Temple		George Proctor	
November 1749 by-election	Colonel Henry Vane		George Proctor	
April 1751 by-election	Colonel Henry Vane		Thomas Duncombe	
May 1753 by-election	James Hayes		Thomas Duncombe	
1754	James Hayes		James Cope	
1756 by-election	James Hayes		Edward Poore	
1757 by-election	Charles Pratt		Edward Poore	
1761	Charles Pratt		James Hayes	
February 1762 by-election	Thomas Pym Hales		James Hayes	
1768	Thomas Duncombe		Richard Croftes	
1771 by-election	Thomas Duncombe		James Hayes	
1774	Thomas Duncombe		Thomas Dummer	
1775	John Cooper		Sir Philip Hales	
September 1779 by-election	Thomas Duncombe		Sir Philip Hales	
December 1779 by-election	Hon. Bartholomew Bouverie		Sir Philip Hales	
February 1780	Bobby Shafto		Sir Philip Hales	
September 1780	Bobby Shafto		Hon. Henry Seymour-Conway	
1784	Bobby Shafto		Hon. William Seymour-Conway	
1790	Hon. Bartholomew Bouverie		Sir William Scott	
1796	Hon. Edward Bouverie		Sir William Scott	
March 1801 by-election	Hon. Edward Bouverie		Viscount Folkestone	
1802	Hon. Edward Bouverie		Hon. John Ward	Tory
June 1803 by-election	The Lord de Blaquiere	Tory	Hon. John Ward	Tory
August 1803 by-election	The Lord de Blaquiere	Tory	Viscount Marsham	Tory
1806	Hon. Bartholomew Bouverie	Whig	Hon. Duncombe Pleydell-Bouverie	Whig
1807	Hon. Bartholomew Bouverie	Whig	Sir Thomas Plumer	Tory
1812	Charles Henry Bouverie	Whig	Sir Thomas Plumer	Tory
1813 by-election	Sir Thomas Brooke-Pechell		Edward Golding	
1818	Viscount Folkestone	Whig	Sir William Scott	Tory
Feb 1819 by-election	Hon. Bartholomew Bouverie	Whig	Sir Thomas Brooke-Pechell	Tory
June 1826	Thomas Grimston Estcourt	Tory	Robert Southey	Tory
December 1826 by-election	Hon. Bartholomew Bouverie	Whig	Alexander Powell	Tory
1830	James Brougham	Whig	Charles Shaw-Lefevre	Whig
May 1831	James Brougham	Whig	Thomas Creevey	Whig
July 1831 by-election	Hon. Philip Pleydell-Bouverie	Whig	Thomas Creevey	Whig
1832	Constituency abolished			
