= Maurice Bocland (Downton MP) =

English Member of Parliament

Maurice Bocland or Bockland (20 April 1648 – by 28 November 1710) was an English Member of Parliament for Downton.

He was the son of Walter Bockland and father of Maurice Bocland, who also served as Members of Parliament.
