= Philip Bouverie-Pusey =

English heir & landowner (1746-1828)

The Honourable Philip Pusey
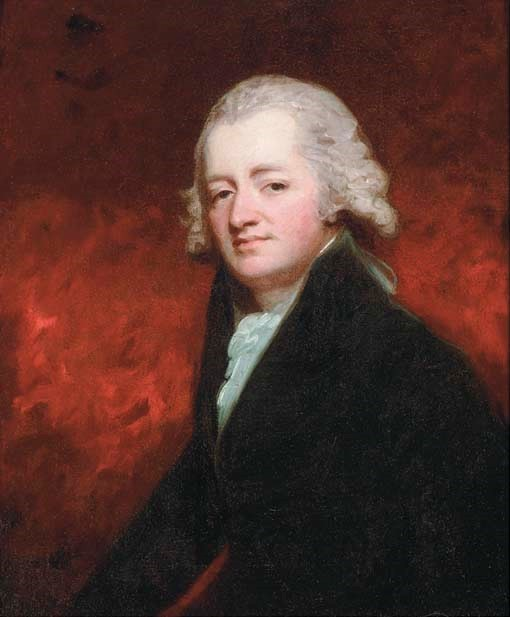
- portrait of a gentleman said to be the Honorable Philip Bouverie-Pusey, painting by George Romney, 1790.
- Born: Philip Bouverie; 8 October 1746; Westminster, London
- Died: 14 April 1828 (aged 81)
- Spouse: Lady Lucy Cave (m. 1798)
- Children: 9, including Philip, Edward
- Parent(s): Jacob Bouverie, 1st Viscount Folkestone; Elizabeth Marsham
- Relatives: William Bouverie, 1st Earl of Radnor (half-brother); Edward Bouverie (half-brother); Robert Marsham, 1st Baron Romney (grandfather); Sir William des Bouverie, 1st Baronet (grandfather); Robert Marsham, 2nd Baron Romney (uncle); Charles Marsham, 1st Earl of Romney (cousin)

Hon. Philip Bouverie-Pusey (8 October 1746 – 14 April 1828) was an English heir and landowner.

== Early life ==
Pusey was born Philip Bouverie on 8 October 1746 in Westminster, London. He was the only surviving son of Jacob Bouverie and, his second wife, the former Elizabeth Marsham. Shortly after his birth, his father was created Viscount Folkestone and Baron Longford on 29 June 1747. From his father's first marriage to Mary Clarke, he had many half-siblings, including William Bouverie, 1st Earl of Radnor, Hon. Anne Bouverie (wife of Hon. George Talbot, son of Charles Talbot, 1st Baron Talbot), Hon. Mary Bouverie (wife of Anthony Ashley Cooper, 4th Earl of Shaftesbury), Hon. Charlotte Bouverie (wife of John Grant), Hon. Harriet Bouverie (wife of Sir James Tylney-Long, 7th Baronet), and the Hon. Edward Bouverie (father of Edward Bouverie and Lt.-Gen. Sir Henry Frederick Bouverie).

His mother was the eldest daughter of Robert Marsham, 1st Baron Romney and the former Elizabeth Shovell (daughter of Admiral Sir Cloudesley Shovell). Through his uncle, Robert Marsham, 2nd Baron Romney, he was first cousin of Charles Marsham, 1st Earl of Romney. His father, a son of Sir William des Bouverie, 1st Baronet and his second wife Anne Urry (daughter and heiress of David Urry of London), dropped the prefix "des" in his surname by Act of Parliament on 22 April 1737, and inherited Longford Castle and his father's baronetcy from his brother Edward in 1736.

== Career ==
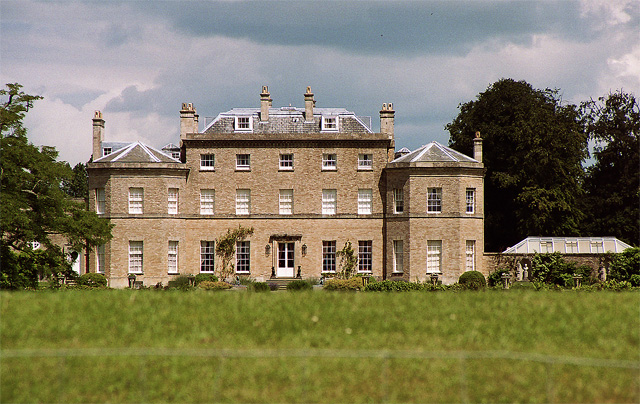
Pusey House in Pusey

In 1784, Philip took the surname of Pusey to inherit the manorial Pusey estate in the Vale of White Horse, which had been settled at the north-west Berkshire estate of that name since the eleventh century. His father's sister, the former Jane Bouverie, had married John Allen-Pusey and when he died without issue, Allen-Pusey's sisters selected Philip to inherit the estate (which had been bequeathed to Allen, who took the additional name of Pusey, by his uncle, Charles Pusey, who died in 1710). The estate included a large country house, known as Pusey House, designed by John Sanderson for Allen-Pusey in 1753.

== Personal life ==
On 20 August 1798, he was married to Lady Lucy Cave (née Sherard) (1771–1858) at St George's Hanover Square Church. Lady Lucy was the widow of Sir Thomas Cave, 7th Baronet (former MP for Leicestershire) and daughter of the Rev. Robert Sherard, 4th Earl of Harborough and Jane (née Reeve) Sherard. Her older brother was Philip Sherard, 5th Earl of Harborough. Together, they lived at Pusey House and at Grosvenor Square in London, and were the parents of four sons and five daughters, including:

- Philip Bouverie-Pusey (1799–1855), who married Lady Emily Frances Theresa Herbert, daughter of Henry Herbert, 2nd Earl of Carnarvon and Kitty Herbert, Countess of Carnarvon, in 1822.
- Edward Bouverie-Pusey (1800–1882), a religious professor and one of the leaders of the Oxford Movement who married Margaret Raymond-Parker, daughter of John Raymond-Barker of Fairford Park.
- Elizabeth Bouverie-Pusey (1803–1883), who married the Rev. James H. Montagu Luxmoore, son of Rt. Rev. John Luxmoore and brother of Charles Scott Luxmoore.
- Charlotte Bouverie-Pusey (1807–1883), who married Richard Lynch Cotton in 1839.
- William Bouverie-Pusey (1810–1888), the Rector at Langley, Kent who married Catherine Freeman, daughter of Thomas Freeman.

Pusey died on 14 April 1828 and his widow, Lady Lucy Pusey, died on 27 March 1858.
