= Bouverie =

Bouverie may refer to:

== Place ==
- Bouverie, Port Glasgow, Inverclyde, Scotland, United Kingdom
- Bouverie Goddard
- Bouverie Street

== People ==
- Bouverie (surname)

== See also ==
- des Bouverie
- Pleydell-Bouverie
- Bouwerie
- Bouveret syndrome (disambiguation)
