= Bouverie (surname) =

Bouverie is an English surname, and may refer to:

- Bartholomew Bouverie (1753–1835), British MP
- Charles Henry Bouverie (1782–1836), British MP
- Edward des Bouverie (c. 1690 – 1736), British MP and baronet
- Edward Bouverie (senior) (1738–1810), British MP
- Edward Bouverie (junior) (1760–1824), British MP
- Edward Bouverie Pusey (1800–1882), English churchman
- Jacob des Bouverie, 1st Viscount Folkestone (1694–1761)
- William des Bouverie (1656–1717), English merchant and baronet
- William Bouverie, 1st Earl of Radnor (1725–1776)
- William Henry Bouverie (1752–1806), British MP
