= Edward Bouverie =

Edward Bouverie may refer to:

- Edward Bouverie (senior) (1738–1810), English politician
- Edward Bouverie (junior) (1767–1858), English landowner, son of the first
- Edward Bouverie (1760–1824), MP for Downton, nephew of the first

== See also ==
- Edward Pleydell-Bouverie (1818–1889), British politician
- Sir Edward des Bouverie (1688–1736), British landowner and politician
