= Pleydell baronets =

Extinct baronetcy

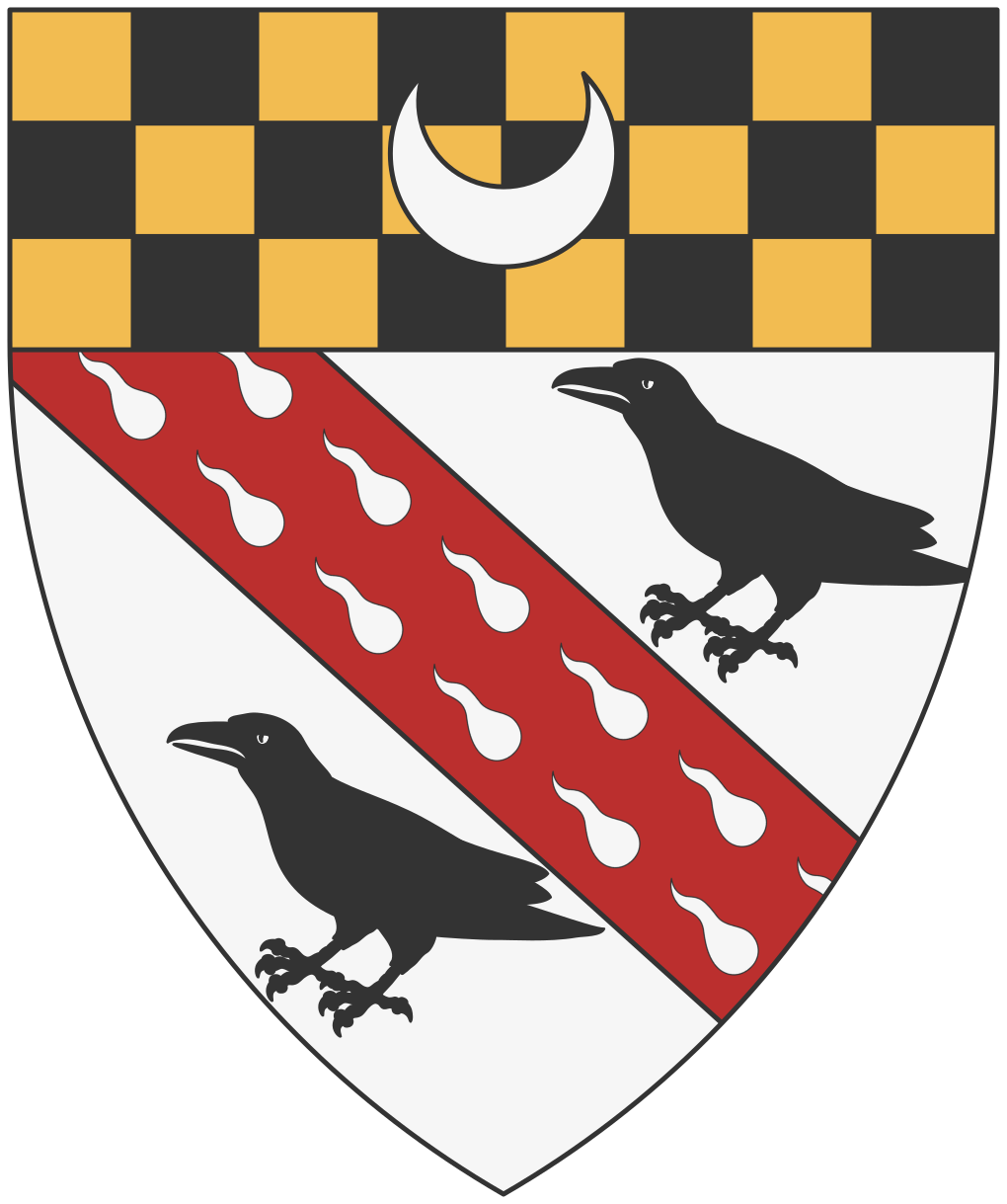
- Escutcheon of the Pleydell baronets of Coleshill
- Creation date: 1732
- Status: extinct
- Extinction date: 1768

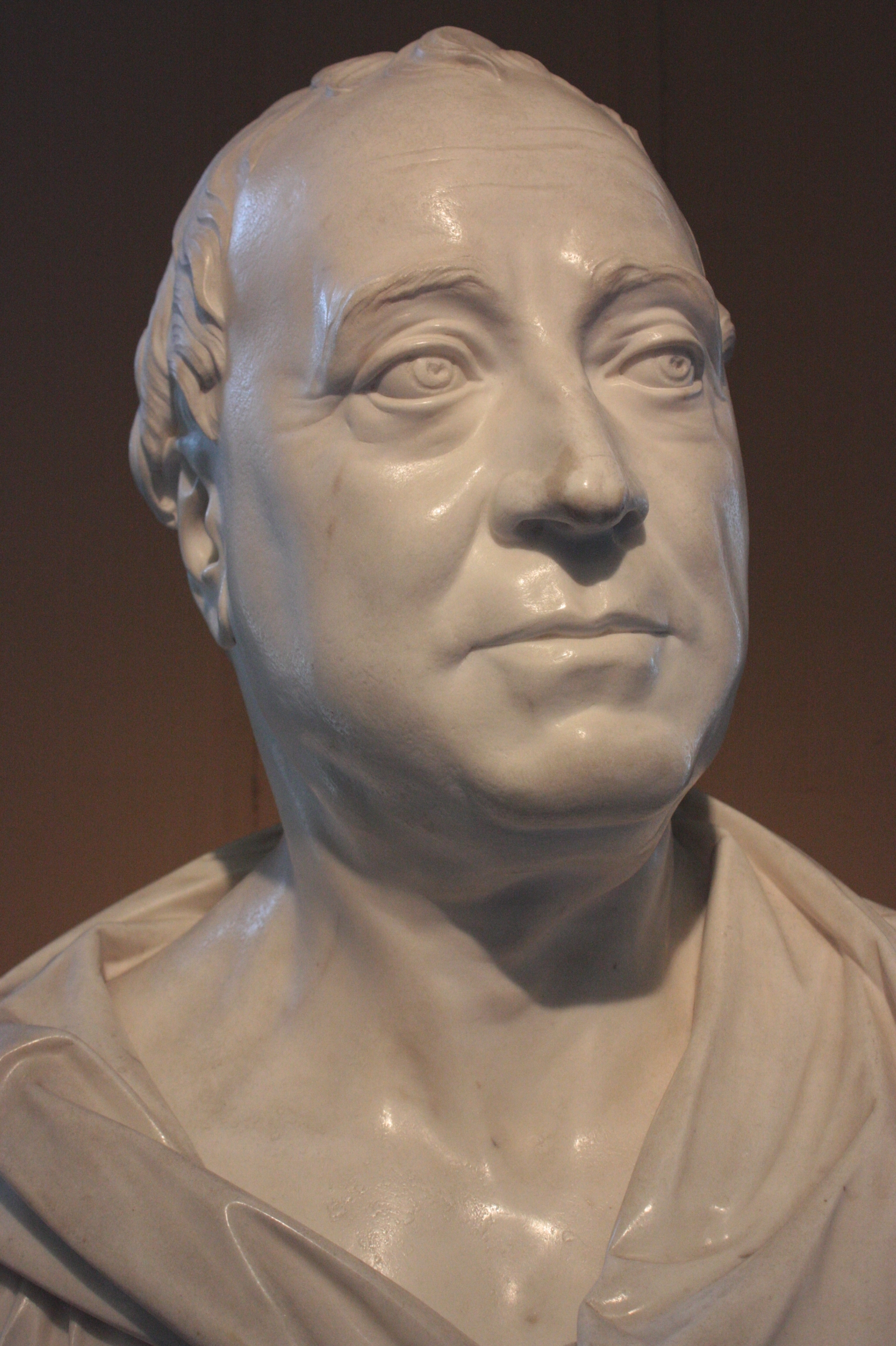
Sir Mark Pleydell by Roubiliac, 1755, Victoria and Albert Museum

The Pleydell Baronetcy, of Coleshill in the County of Berkshire (now Oxfordshire), was a title in the Baronetage of Great Britain. It was created on 15 June 1732 for Mark Stuart Pleydell. His mother Jane Stuart was the daughter of Sir Nicholas Steward, 1st Baronet; and his father Thomas Pleydell was the nephew of Sir Henry Pratt, 3rd Baronet of Coleshill. The title became extinct on his death in 1768.

== Pleydell baronets, of Coleshill (1732) ==
- Sir Mark Stuart Pleydell, 1st Baronet (c. 1693–1768)

== Extended family ==
The 1st Baronet's daughter and only child, Harriet Pleydell, married William Bouverie, 1st Earl of Radnor. Their son Jacob Pleydell-Bouverie, 2nd Earl of Radnor, succeeded to the Pleydell estates and assumed the additional surname of Pleydell.

== See also ==
- Earl of Radnor for Pleydell-Bouverie baronets

Baronetage of Great Britain
Preceded by Brown baronets	Pleydell baronets of Coleshill; 15 June 1732	Succeeded by Heathcote baronets
