= William Bouverie =

William Bouverie may refer to:

- William Bouverie, 1st Earl of Radnor (1725–1776), British peer
- William Henry Bouverie (1752–1806), British politician
- William Bouverie (priest) (1797–1877), Archdeacon of Norfolk

== See also ==
- William des Bouverie (1656–1717), merchant in London
