= Edward Bouverie (senior) =

British politician

Member of Parliament for Northampton
- In office 1801–1810 Serving with Hon. Spencer Perceval
- Preceded by: Parliament of Great Britain
- Succeeded by: William Hanbury Bateman; Hon. Spencer Perceval
- In office 1790–1800 Serving with Lord Compton, Hon. Spencer Perceval
- Preceded by: Fiennes Trotman; Lord Compton
- Succeeded by: Parliament of the United Kingdom

Member of Parliament for Salisbury
- In office 1761–1771 Serving with Julines Beckford, Samuel Eyre, Stephen Fox
- Preceded by: Hon. William Bouverie; Julines Beckford
- Succeeded by: Viscount Folkestone; Stephen Fox

Personal details
- Born: 5 September 1738
- Died: 3 September 1810 (aged 71)
- Spouse: Harriet Fawkener (m. 1764–1810)
- Children: 8, including Edward and Henry
- Parent(s): Jacob Bouverie, 1st Viscount Folkestone; Mary Clarke
- Relatives: William Bouverie, 1st Earl of Radnor (brother); Jacob Pleydell-Bouverie, 2nd Earl of Radnor (nephew); Sir William des Bouverie, 1st Baronet (grandfather)
- Education: Eton College
- Alma mater: Christ Church, Oxford

Hon. Edward Bouverie (5 September 1738 – 3 September 1810) was a British politician who sat in the House of Commons between 1761 and 1810.

== Early life ==
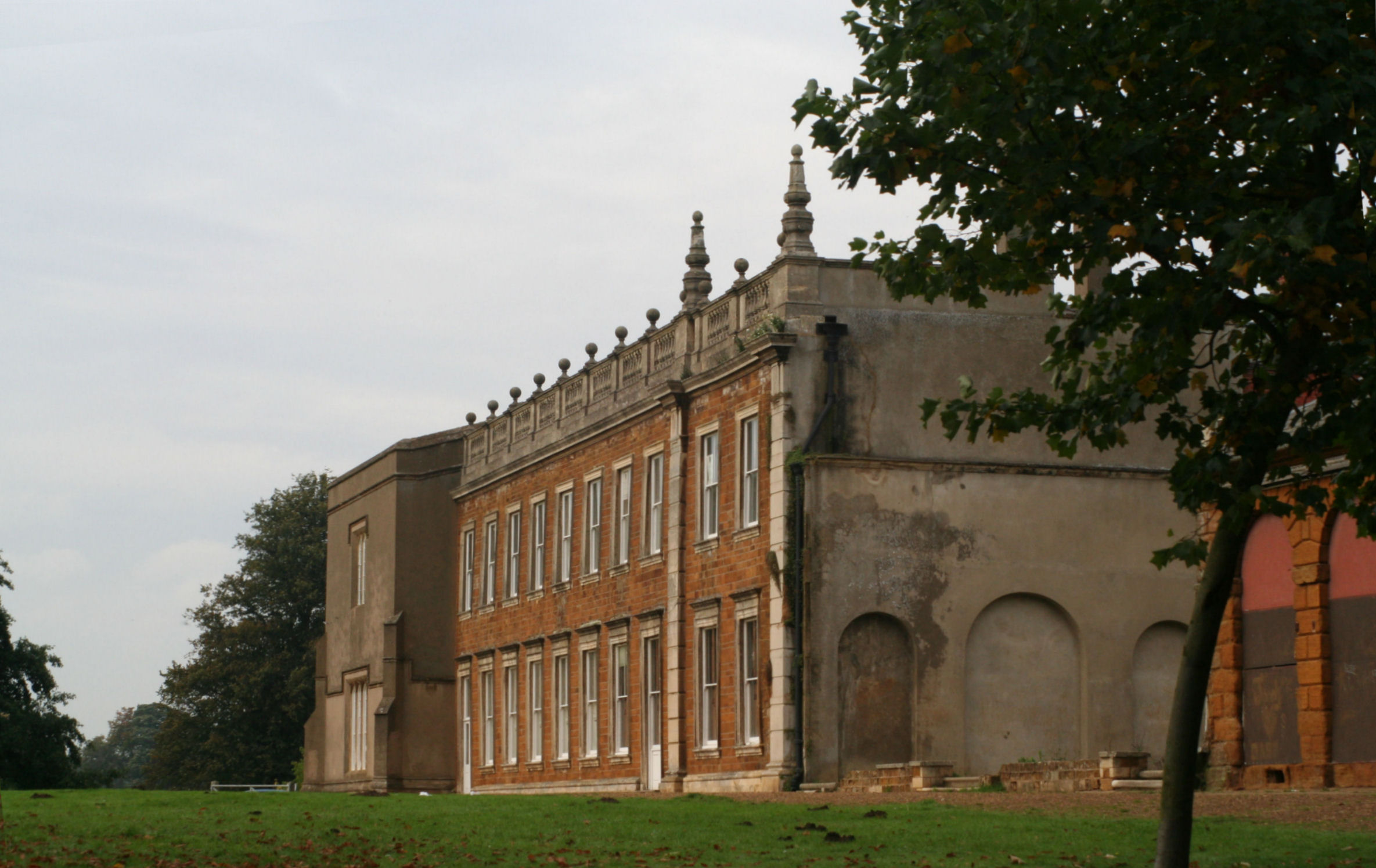
Delapré Abbey

Bouverie was born 5 September 1738 as the second son of Jacob Bouverie, 1st Viscount Folkestone and the former Mary Clarke. His elder brother William inherited their father's viscountcy before himself being made 1st Earl of Radnor. He had four sisters, Hon. Anne Bouverie (who married Rev. Hon. George Talbot, third son of Charles Talbot, 1st Baron Talbot), Hon. Mary Bouverie (second wife Anthony Ashley Cooper, 4th Earl of Shaftesbury), Hon. Charlotte Bouverie (wife of John Grant), and Hon. Harriet Bouverie (first wife Sir James Tylney-Long, 7th Baronet). After his mother's death in 1739, his father married Hon. Elizabeth Marsham, eldest daughter of Robert Marsham, 1st Baron Romney, in 1741. From his father's second marriage, he had a younger half-brother, Hon. Philip Bouverie (later Bouverie-Pusey), who married Lady Lucy Cave, widow of Sir Thomas Cave, 7th Baronet, MP, and only daughter of Robert Sherard, 4th Earl of Harborough, in 1798.

His father was the son of Sir William des Bouverie, 1st Baronet, a Turkey merchant in London and the former Anne Urry (daughter and heiress of David Urry of London). His mother was the daughter and heiress of Bartholomew Clarke of Delapré Abbey and Hardingstone, Northamptonshire, and the former Mary Young (sister and heiress of Hitch Young of Roehampton).

He was educated at Eton from 1753 to 1756 and matriculated at Christ Church, Oxford in 1757.

== Career ==
Bouverie was first elected to parliament for Salisbury in 1761, a seat under the patronage of the Bouverie family, which he occupied until his nephew Viscount Folkestone came of age and could take up the seat in 1771. In Parliament, he followed an independent line. In 1763 he supported the radical MP John Wilkes when he was charged with seditious libel for an article attacking George III, but voted with Administration on the expulsion of Wilkes from parliament in 1769. At various times he was listed as a Whig supporter and at others as a Tory.

Bouverie attempted to return to parliament in 1774 offering himself at Northampton hoping for the support of the Compton interest, but withdrew without making the canvass. Although he considered standing at a by-election in 1782 and the general election in 1784 he did not stand again until 1790 when he won one of the Northampton seats.

Following his return to Parliament Bouverie became a staunch supporter of Charles James Fox and voted with him consistently. He was supported by his wife, a renowned London beauty and socialite who became a political hostess and close friend of other aristocratic supporters.

== Personal life ==
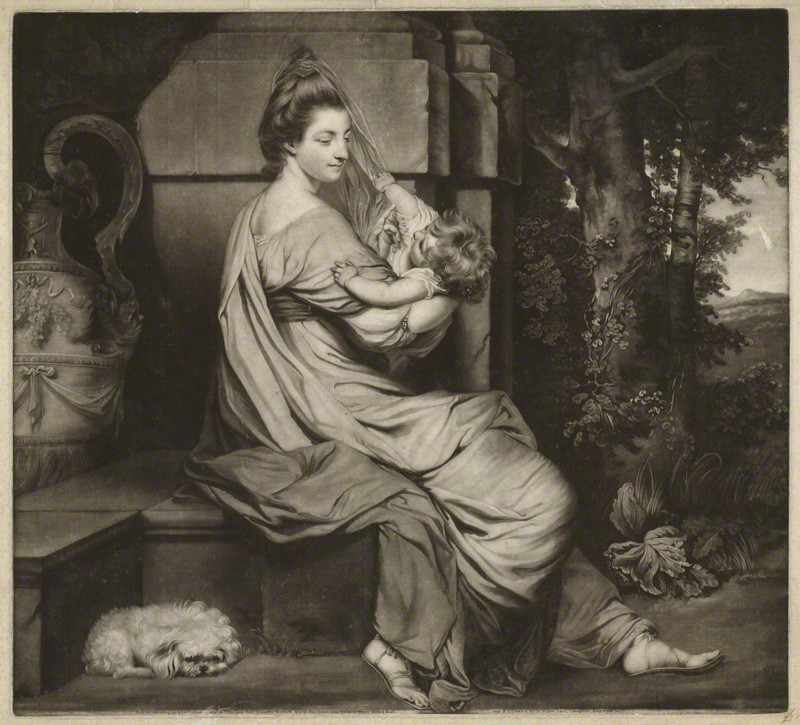
Harriet Bouverie 1770

As the second son, Bouverie had to some extent make his own way in the world which he did by his marriage to Harriet Falkner the daughter of Sir Everard Fawkener, ambassador to the Porte on 30 June 1764. Together, Edward and Harriet had three sons and five daughters, including:

- Edward Bouverie (1767–1858), who inherited Delapré estate and married Catherine Castle, heiress and daughter of William Castle.
- Harriet Elizabeth Bouverie (1771–1810), who married James St Clair-Erskine, 2nd Earl of Rosslyn.
- Frances Anne Bouverie, who died unmarried.
- Mary Charlotte Bouverie (d. 1816), who married William Maxwell for Lanark Burghs (1768–1833) in 1800.
- John Bouverie (1779–1855), who became rector at Midhurst from 1808 until his death in 1855.
- Jane Bouverie (1781–1805), who married Sir Francis Vincent, 9th Baronet in 1802.
- Sir Henry Frederick Bouverie (1783–1852), a Lieutenant-General who served as Governor of Malta from 1836 to 1843.
- Diana Juliana Margaretta Bouverie (1786–1873), who married Hon. George Ponsonby, son of William Ponsonby, 1st Baron Ponsonby.

In 1811, a year after Bouverie died, his widow married Lord Robert Spencer (the son of Charles Spencer, 3rd Duke of Marlborough), with whom Harriet had a long liaison. Their daughter Diana, who was considered to be Spencer's daughter, was left the bulk of Spencer's estate.

=== Delapré Abbey ===
On his marriage, Bouverie bought Delapré Abbey for £22,000 from Sir Charles Hardy, Governor of New York, the husband of Mary Tate, the last of the Tate family, who had owned the estate since their purchase of the former nunnery on its dissolution.

At home, Edward worked to develop the Delapré estate. In 1765/6 he enclosed the open fields at Hardingstone, making him one of the pioneers of the early inclosure movement in Northamptonshire. In the early 1770s Hunsbury Hill farm, which was part of the estate and an early model farm, was built. We may never know where Bouverie got the design for his new farm but it is clear that his architect provided quite an innovative and effective solution. Contributions were also made for re-roofing and rebuilding the chancel and the top of the tower local church of St Edmonds, Hardingstone.

Parliament of Great Britain
Preceded by Hon. William Bouverie; Julines Beckford	Member of Parliament for Salisbury; 1761–1771; With: Julines Beckford to 1765; Samuel Eyre 1765–68; Stephen Fox from 1768	Succeeded by Viscount Folkestone; Stephen Fox
Preceded by Fiennes Trotman; Lord Compton	Member of Parliament for Northampton; 1790–1800; With: Lord Compton to 1796; Hon. Spencer Perceval from 1796	Succeeded by Parliament of the United Kingdom
Parliament of the United Kingdom
Preceded by Parliament of Great Britain	Member of Parliament for Northampton; 1801–1810; With: Hon. Spencer Perceval	Succeeded by William Hanbury Bateman; Hon. Spencer Perceval
