= Jacob Bouverie, 1st Viscount Folkestone =

English politician (1694–1761)

The Right Honourable The Viscount Folkestone
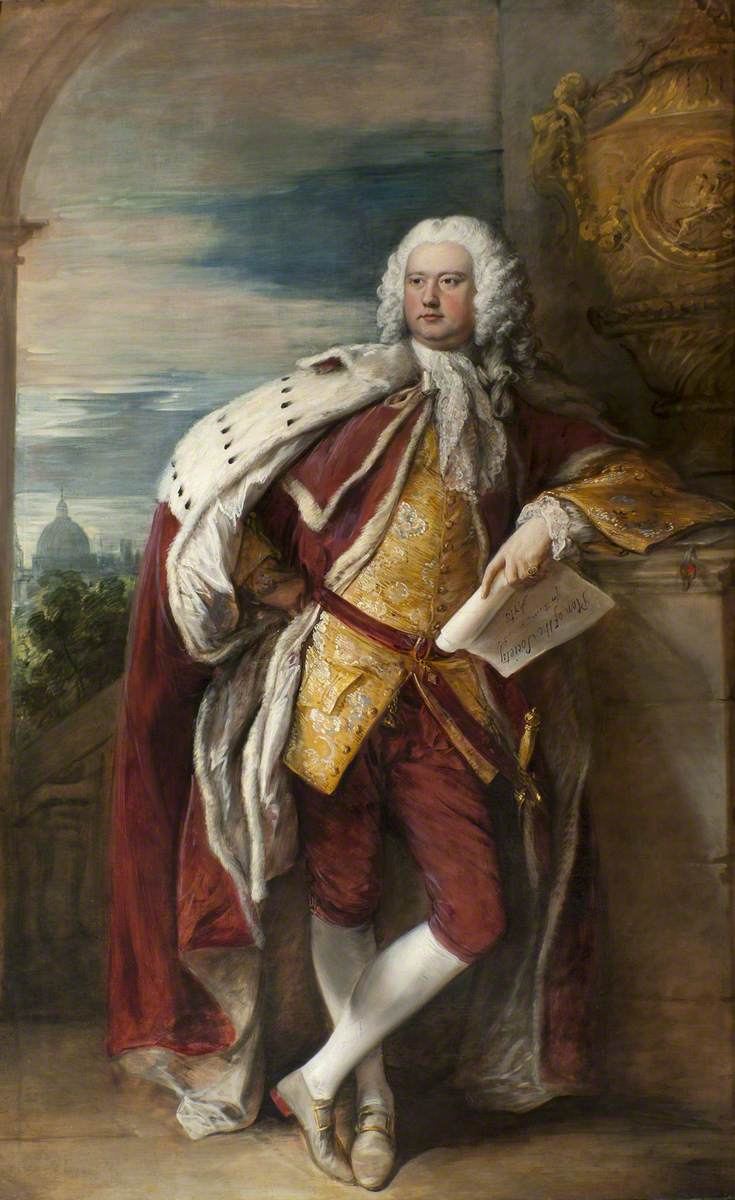

Member of Parliament for Salisbury
- In office 1741–1747 Serving with Sir Edward Seymour
- Preceded by: Peter Bathurst; Henry Hoare
- Succeeded by: William Bouverie; Edward Poore

Personal details
- Born: Jacob des Bouverie c. 14 October 1694 London, England
- Died: 17 February 1761 (aged 66)
- Spouses: Mary Clarke (m. 1724; died 1739) Elizabeth Marsham (m. 1741)
- Children: 13
- Parent(s): Sir William des Bouverie, 1st Baronet; Anne Urry
- Education: Christ Church, Oxford

Jacob Bouverie, 1st Viscount Folkestone (bapt. 14 October 1694 – 17 February 1761) was an English politician, known as Sir Jacob Bouverie, 3rd Baronet from 1737 to 1747.

== Early life ==
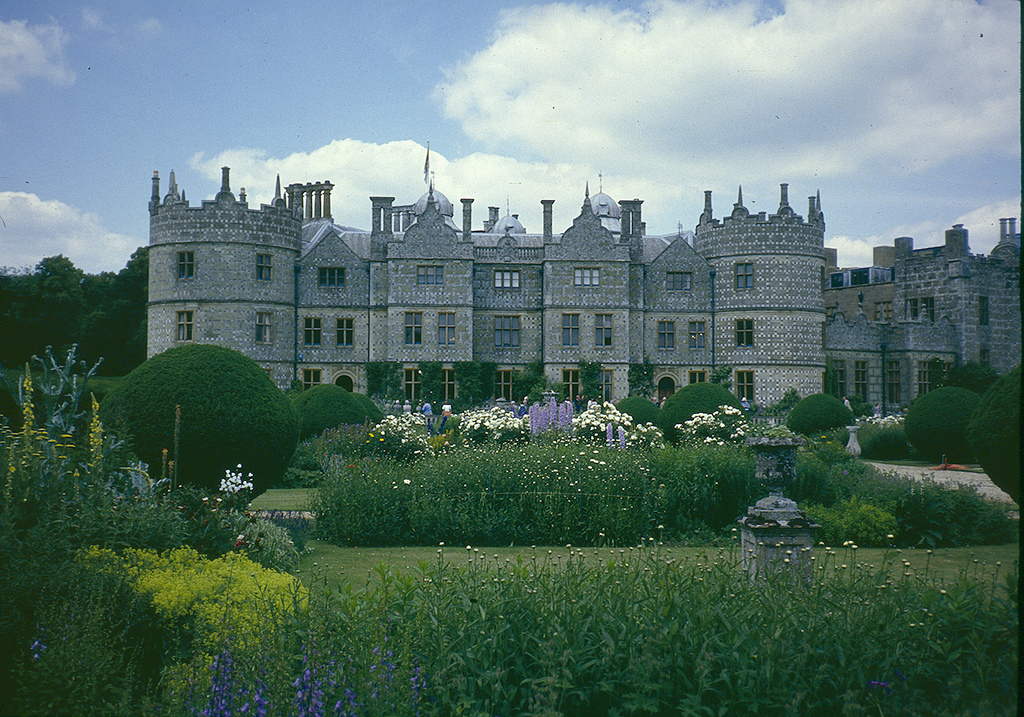
Longford Castle, Wiltshire

Lord Folkestone was born Jacob des Bouverie and baptised on 14 October 1694 in St Katharine Cree, London, the son of Sir William des Bouverie, 1st Baronet and his second wife Anne Urry (daughter and heiress of David Urry of London).

Bouverie's Name Act 1736
- Act of Parliament
- Parliament of Great Britain
- Long title: An Act for enabling Sir Jacob Des Bouverie Baronet, and John Des Bouverie Esquire, and their respective Issue, and Elizabeth Des Bouverie Sister of the said John, to take and use the Surname of Bouverie, pursuant to the Desire of Jacob Des Bouverie Esquire, and Sir Christopher Des Bouverie, deceased.
- Citation: 10 Geo. 2. c. 8 Pr.
- Territorial extent: Great Britain

Dates
- Royal assent: 22 April 1737
- Commencement: 1 February 1737 (Note: Start of session.)

Status: Current legislation

On 21 November 1736, he succeeded his elder brother, Edward, in the baronetcy and to Longford Castle. He dropped the prefix "des" in his surname by a private act of Parliament, Bouverie's Name Act 1736 (10 Geo. 2. c. 8 Pr.), on 22 April 1737.

== Career ==
He was admitted to the Middle Temple in 1708, and matriculated at Christ Church, Oxford on 20 October 1711.

He was Member of Parliament in the Parliament of Great Britain for Salisbury between 1741 and 1747, and was appointed Recorder of Salisbury in 1744.

He was created Viscount Folkestone and Baron Longford on 29 June 1747 and was appointed one of the deputy lieutenants of Wiltshire on 8 November 1750. In 1755 he was elected the first president of the Society for the Encouragement of Arts, Manufactures and Commerce (now the Royal Society of Arts).

== Personal life ==
He married, firstly, Mary Clarke on 31 January 1724 in St Paul's Cathedral, London; she was the daughter of Bartholomew Clarke, merchant of Hardingstone and Mary (née Young), sister and sole heir to Hitch Younge MP. Together, they were the parents of five sons and six daughters, but only two sons survived infancy, including:

- William Bouverie, 1st Earl of Radnor (1725–1776), who married twice.
- Mary Bouverie (1726–1729), who died young.
- Jacob Bouverie (1727–1731), who died young.
- Bartholomew Bouverie (1728–1741), who died young.
- Hon. Anne Bouverie (1729–1813), who married Hon. George Talbot, son of Charles Talbot, 1st Baron Talbot.
- Hon. Mary Bouverie (1730–1804), who married Anthony Ashley Cooper, 4th Earl of Shaftesbury.
- Harriet Bouverie (1731–1731), who died young.
- Hon. Charlotte Bouverie (1732–1809), who married John Grant of White Waltham (d. 1804).
- Edward Bouverie (1734–1734), who died young.
- Hon. Harriet Bouverie (1736–1777), who married Sir James Tylney-Long, 7th Baronet.
- Hon. Edward Bouverie (1738–1810), who married Harriett Fawkener and was the father of Edward Bouverie, Lt.-Gen. Sir Henry Frederick Bouverie.

His first wife died on 16 November 1739, and was buried at Britford, Wiltshire. He married, secondly, Elizabeth Marsham, on 21 April 1741 at Swanscombe in Kent. She was the eldest daughter of Robert Marsham, 1st Baron Romney and the former Elizabeth Shovell (daughter of Admiral Sir Cloudesley Shovell). They had two sons:

- Jacob Bouverie (1742–1745), who died young.
- Philip Bouverie-Pusey (1746–1828), who married Lady Lucy Cave, widow of Sir Thomas Cave, 7th Baronet, MP, and only daughter of Robert Sherard, 4th Earl of Harborough, in 1798.

Lord Folkestone died on 17 February 1761. After his death, his eldest son William inherited his estates. His second surviving son Edward married Harriet Fawkener and became the owner of Delapré Abbey, Northamptonshire. Members of the Bouverie family went on to hold the Salisbury seat in Parliament for almost the next hundred years.

== Notes ==
Parliament of Great Britain
Preceded by Peter Bathurst; Henry Hoare	Member of Parliament for Salisbury; 1741–1747; With: Sir Edward Seymour	Succeeded by William Bouverie; Edward Poore
Peerage of Great Britain
New creation	Viscount Folkestone; 1747–1761	Succeeded by William Bouverie
Baronetage of Great Britain
Preceded by Edward des Bouverie	Baronet (of St Catherine Cree Church); 1736–1761	Succeeded by Williame Bouverie
