= Jan des Bouvrie =

Dutch designer (1942–2020)

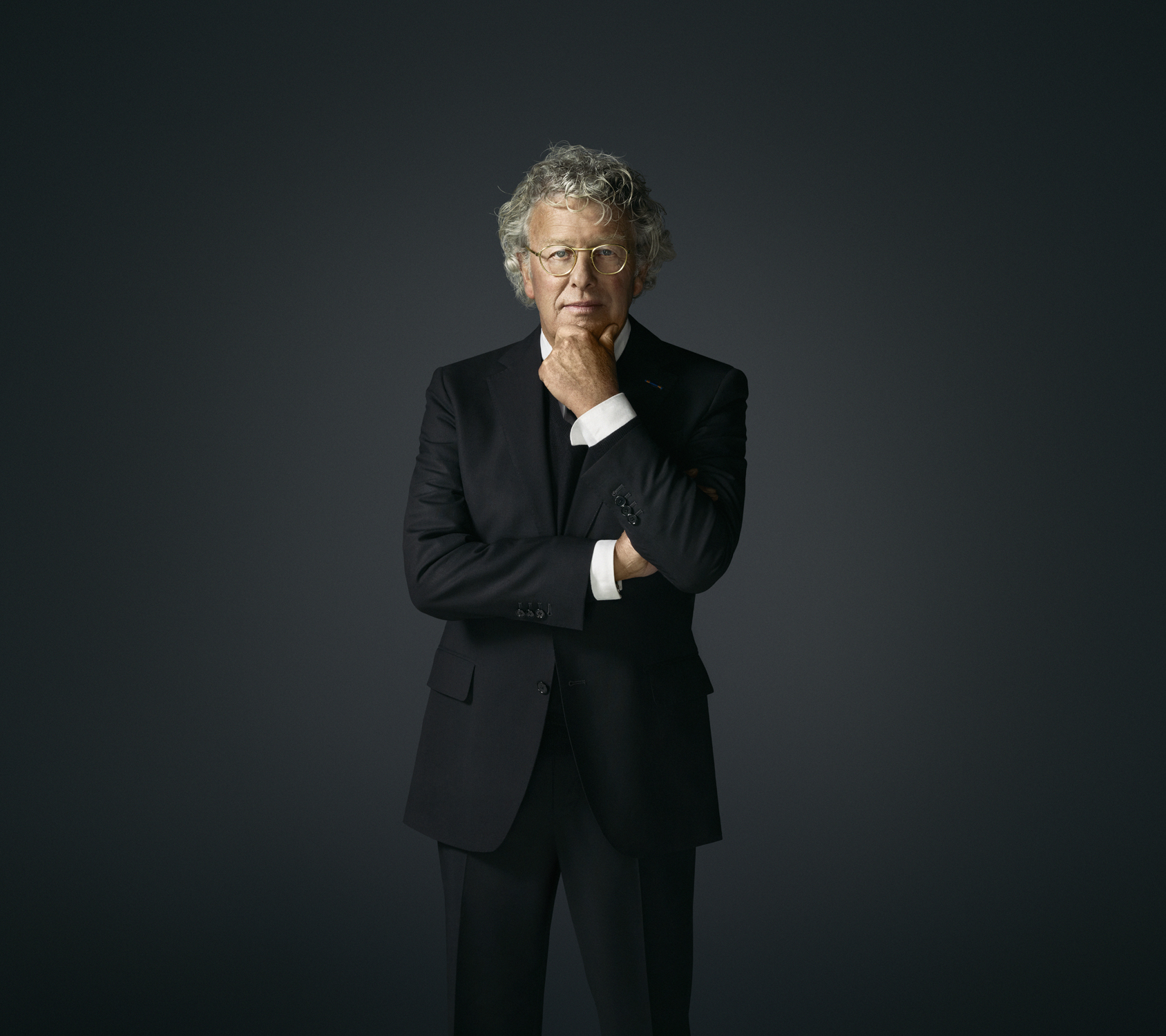
- Jan des Bouvrie
- Born: 3 August 1942; Naarden
- Died: 4 October 2020 (aged 78); Naarden
- Occupation: Designer
- Awards: Dutch Furniture Award, 1999
- Website: jandesbouvrie.nl

Jan des Bouvrie (3 August 1942 – 4 October 2020) was a Dutch architect, interior and product designer, best known for his 1969 "kubusbank sofa", now considered a design classic. Des Bouvrie was active as a distinguished lecturer at various design academies. The design college Jan des Bouvrie Academy, in Deventer is named in his honor.

== Life and work ==
Des Bouvrie was born 3 August 1942 in Naarden. After he finished high school, he went to the Rietveld Academy in Amsterdam at the age of sixteen. He later started his own interior design shop in Naarden, and hosted the TV show TV Woonmagazine. He designed the rooms in the Floris Suite Hotel in "Dutch colonial style with Caribbean temperament".

His own vision on design was developed at the Rietveld Academy in Amsterdam, where he started his professional career. With his unique and progressive ideas the young Des Bouvrie made an impact on the design world. His vision was further developed by working with several manufacturers, including Linteloo, Dutch Originals, and Gelderland. The latter, in 1969, was the first to produce a design of Des Bouvrie's; the kubusbank sofa, which is now recognised as a design classic.

In 1993 Des Bouvrie moved his design studio to the former arsenal of fortress Naarden. Together with his partner, Monique, he transformed the iconic 'Het Arsenaal' building into a showroom for his designs.

Over the years, Jan des Bouvrie's designs have won many awards and distinctions, including the Culture Prize of 1974, the Style Prize in 1990, and the Furniture Prize in 1999. Des Bouvrie's vision is also clearly reflected in the numerous interior design books he published.

In 2009 Des Bouvrie was named Knight in the Order of the Netherlands Lion for his achievements in the field of art and design.

== Personal life ==
Des Bouvrie was married to interior designer Monique des Bouvrie, with whom he had two children. He had two older children from a previous marriage, and several grandchildren. Des Bouvrie died in Naarden on 4 October 2020, aged 78.

=== Ancestry and extended family ===
In the course of an episode of the Dutch television show Verborgen Verleden, which is similar to the British Who Do You Think You Are?, Jan des Bouvrie found that his family was descended from Jehan de le Bouvrie (born about 1480), of Sainghin-en-Mélantois, where his widow, Jeanne de la Motte, inherited a farm with four cows and two horses in 1543. A grandson of Jehan, the merchant Lawrence de Bouverie, born in Sainghin, migrated to England, where his descendant William des Bouverie became the ancestor of the Earls of Radnor, of Longford Castle. Jan des Bouvrie hoped to meet the present-day William Pleydell-Bouverie, 9th Earl of Radnor, but was unsuccessful, as Lord Radnor would not agree to meet him.

== Selected publications ==
- Jan des Bouvrie, Interieur, Jan des Bouvrie, 1990.
- Jan des Bouvrie, Jan des Bouvrie: art & design, 2012.
- Jan des Bouvrie, Doen!: het verhaal van de man die Nederland leerde wonen, 2016.

== See also ==
- The Red Apple
