= Bouveret syndrome =

Bouveret syndrome can refer to:

- Bouveret-Hoffmann syndrome, or paroxysmal tachycardia
- Bouveret's syndrome, or gastric outlet obstruction due to a gallstone
