= George Bouverie Goddard =

English painter

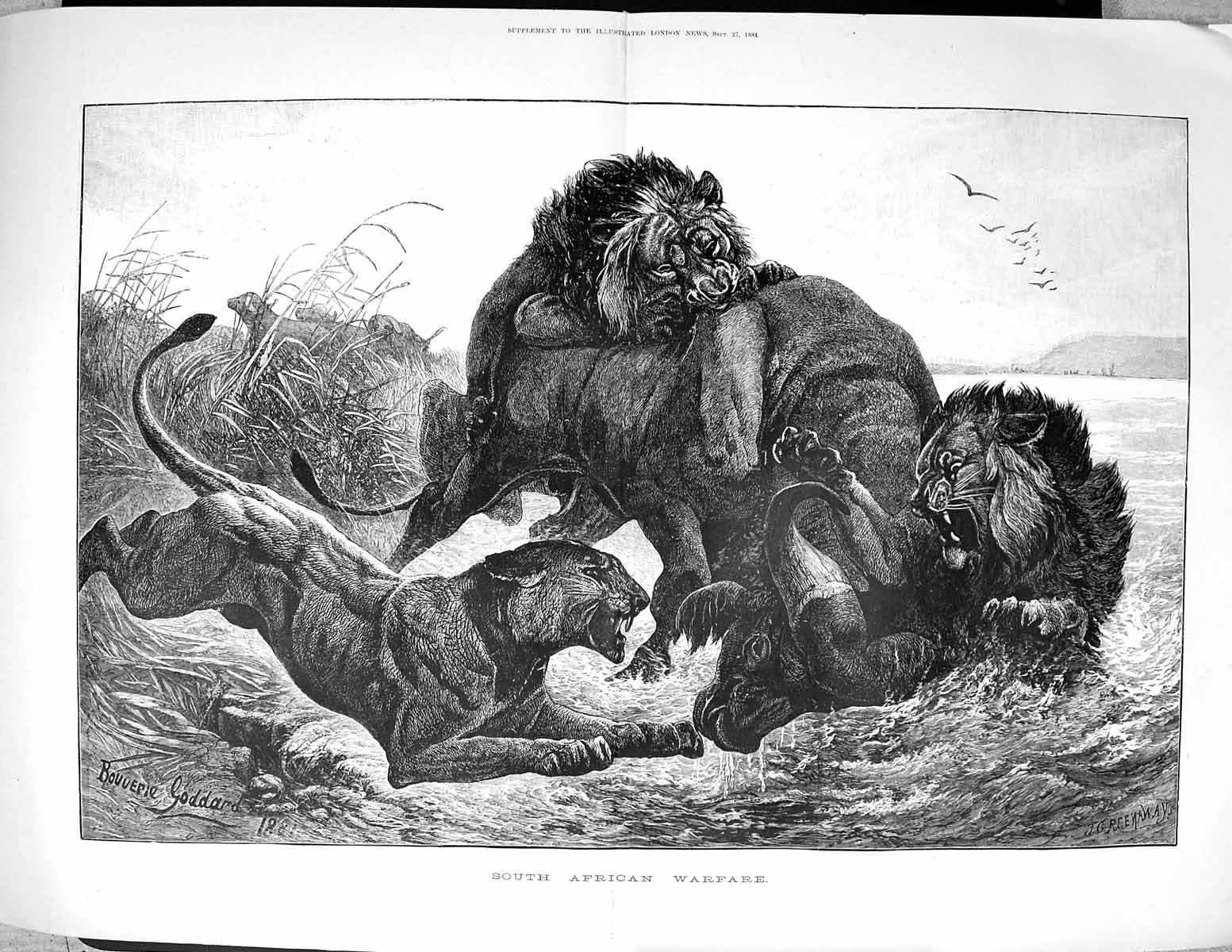
"Lions attacking buffalo" The Illustrated London News

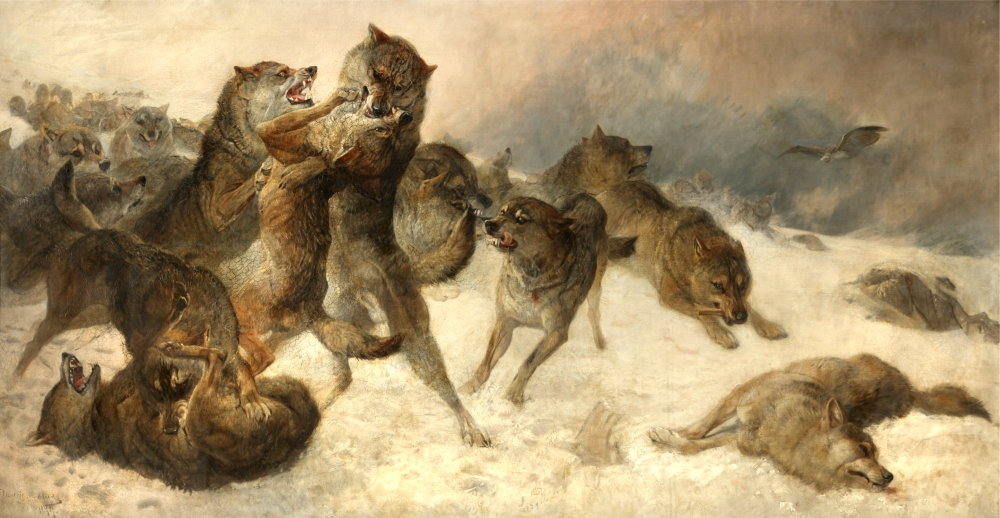
"The Struggle for Existence"

George Bouverie Goddard (25 December 1832 – 6 March 1886) was a British sporting and animal painter and illustrator.

Goddard was born in Salisbury. From age ten, the drawings of this youthful genius were in great demand, even though he had received no formal artistic training, and faced much opposition in choosing art as a profession. Arriving in London in 1849, he spent some two years in sketching animal life in the Zoological Gardens. During this period he eked out a living by drawing on wood sporting illustrations for Punch and other periodicals. On his return to Salisbury he received numerous commissions, but finding the scope of these too limited, he returned and settled in London in 1857.

His first painting, exhibited at the Royal Academy in 1856, was Hunters. Then followed The Casuals in 1866, Home to Die: An Afternoon Fox with the Cotswolds in 1868, The Tournament in 1870, and Sale of New Forest Ponies at Lyndhurst in 1872. In 1875, he exhibited a large painting, some fourteen feet in length, depicting Lord Wolverton's Bloodhounds – this was highly praised in Whyte-Melville's Riding Recollections. Following this in 1876 was Colt-hunting in the New Forest, in 1877 The Fall of Man from Milton's Paradise Lost and in 1879 The Struggle for Existence, now in the Walker Fine Art Gallery in Liverpool. In 1881 he painted Rescued, in 1883 Love and War: In the Abbotsbury Swannery and in 1885 Cowed. The Fall of Man, depicting a scene from Milton's Paradise Lost, was widely praised and singled out by the Royal Academy for its portrayal of "the savagery of the brute nature ensuing upon the disobedience of Adam and Eve".

Goddard was enthusiastic about all field sports, and at home in both covert and hunting-field. "A Hot Chestnut" was Goddard's first contribution to the pages of Punch. Although oil-colour was really his medium, his animal drawings were good, and for some years Punch rejoiced in their new-found hunting draughtsman. Goddard though felt that he must paint pictures rather than draw on wood blocks, and left the magazine, after producing fourteen drawings, some of which were adjudged the best horse images seen in its pages since the death of John Leech. Goddard was a great friend of Charles Keene, and for some time shared a studio in Baker Street.

He died at his residence at Brook Green, Hammersmith, London, after a short illness, of a chill caught during a visit to his dying father, whom he survived only by a few hours.
