= Richard Lynch Cotton =

British vicar and academic administrator

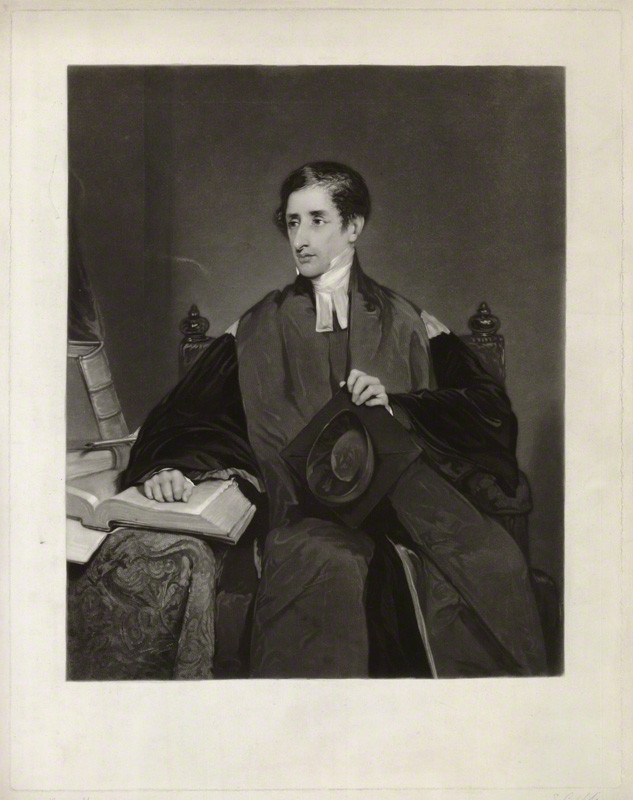
Richard Lynch Cotton

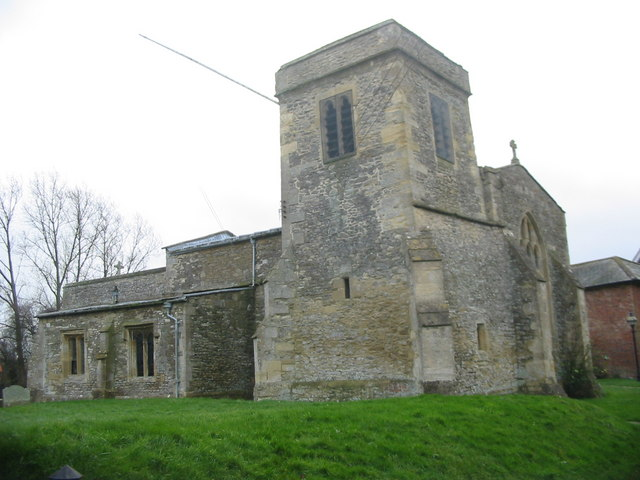
St James' parish church in Denchworth, Berkshire, where Cotton was vicar from 1823 to 1838

Richard Lynch Cotton (14 August 1794 – 8 December 1880) was a British vicar and academic administrator at the University of Oxford.

Cotton was born in Whitchurch, Oxfordshire, the son of Henry Calveley Cotton and Matilda Lockwood, one of 11 children (eight sons and three daughters). He was educated at Charterhouse School and Worcester College, Oxford, where he attained a BA degree in 1815. He was a Fellow of the College from 1816 to 1838 and Provost from 1839 to 1880. He was awarded a Doctor of Divinity in 1839. While Provost at Worcester, Cotton also became Vice-Chancellor of Oxford University in 1852.

Cotton was Vicar of Denchworth, north of Wantage in Berkshire, from 1823 to 1838. He published his lectures and sermons. On 25 June 1839, he married Charlotte Bouverie Pusey, daughter of Hon. Philip Pusey and Lady Lucy Sherard (daughter of Robert Sherard, 4th Earl of Harborough). She lived at 38 St Giles' in Oxford, now part of St Benet's Hall, after Cotton's death during 1881–82.

== See also ==
- Sir Sydney John Cotton (1792–1874), elder brother
- Sir Arthur Thomas Cotton (1803–1899), younger brother

Academic offices
| Preceded by Whittington Landon | Provost of Worcester College, Oxford; 1839–1880 | Succeeded by William Inge |
| Preceded by Frederick Charles Plumptre | Vice-Chancellor of Oxford University; 1852–1856 | Succeeded by David Williams |
