= Jacob Pleydell-Bouverie, 2nd Earl of Radnor =

British politician

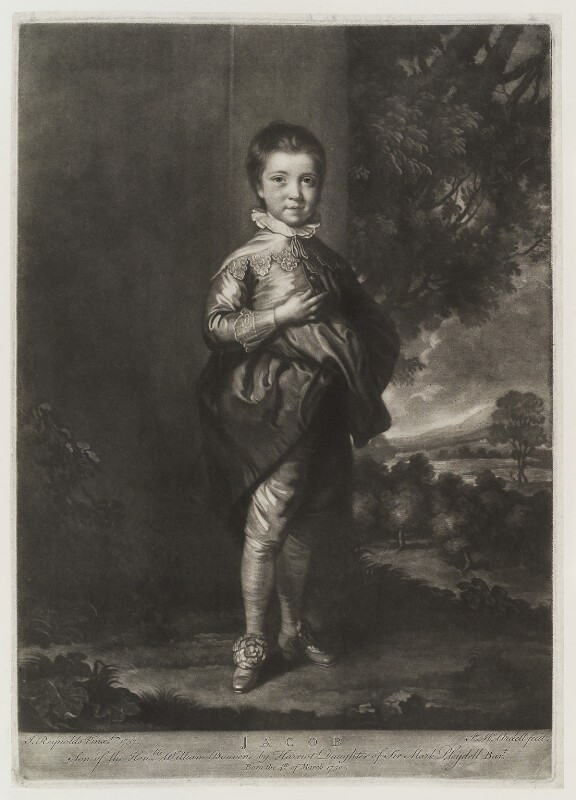
- Lord Radnor as a child (1757)

Member of Parliament for Salisbury
- In office 1771–1776

Personal details
- Born: 4 March 1750 Westminster, England
- Died: 27 January 1828 (aged 77) Wiltshire, England
- Spouse: Anne Duncombe (m. 1777)
- Children: 7, including William, Duncombe and Philip
- Parent: William Bouverie (father)
- Education: University College, Oxford
- Military career
- Rank: Colonel
- Units: Northampton Militia; Berkshire Militia

Jacob Pleydell-Bouverie, 2nd Earl of Radnor FRS FSA (4 March 1750 – 27 January 1828), styled Hon. Jacob Pleydell-Bouverie from 1761 to 1765 and Viscount Folkestone from 1765 to 1776, was a British politician who sat in the House of Commons from 1771 to 1776 when he succeeded to the peerage as Earl of Radnor.

== Life ==
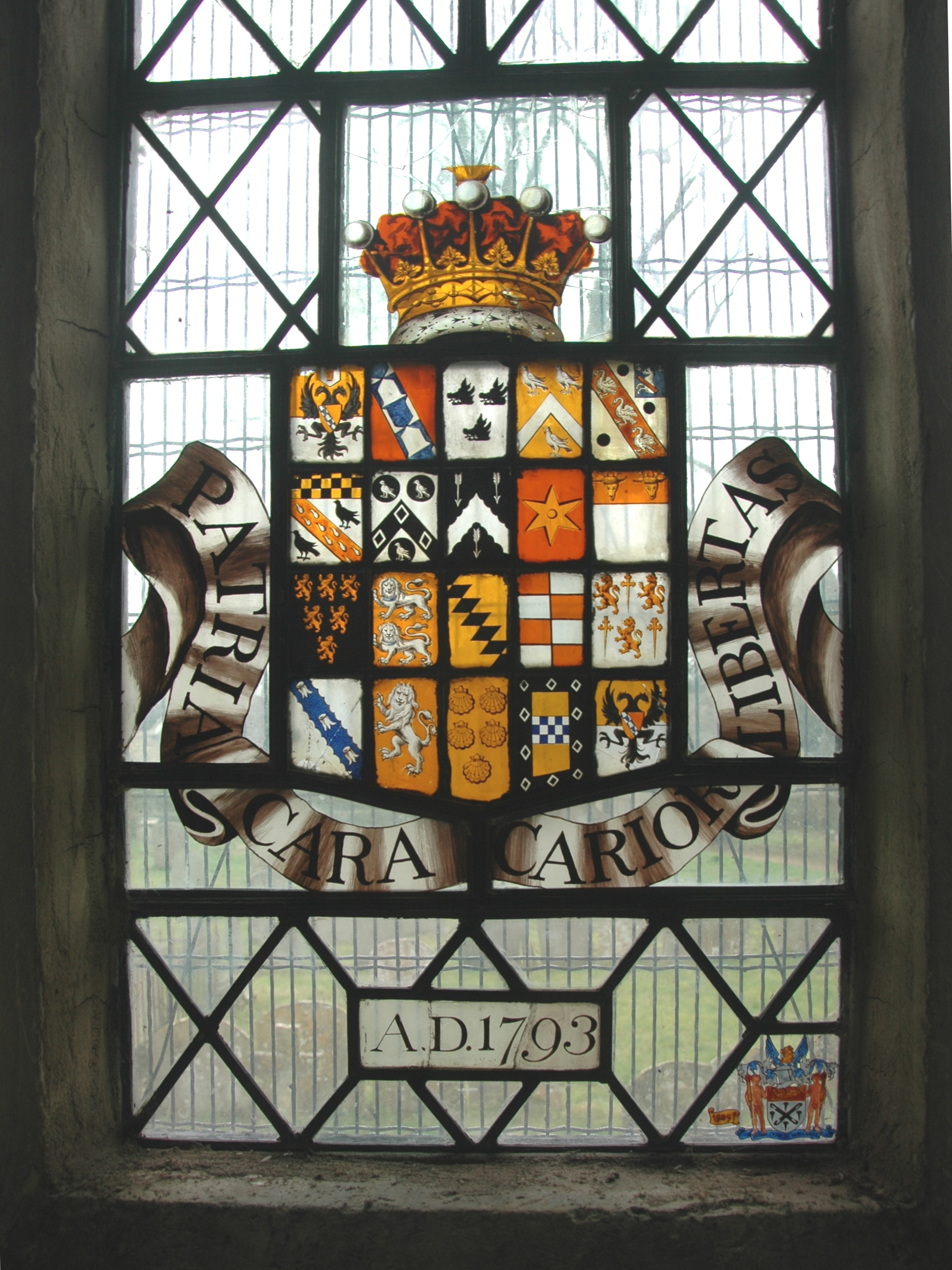
Parish church of St Andrew's Church, Shrivenham, Vale of White Horse: coat of arms, dated 1793, of Jacob Pleydell-Bouverie, 2nd Earl of Radnor in the east window of the chancel

Born in Westminster, he was the son of William Bouverie, 1st Earl of Radnor and Harriet Pleydell, the daughter of Sir Mark Stuart Pleydell of Coleshill House in Berkshire (now Oxfordshire). Jacob was educated at Harrow and University College, Oxford, from which he took a BA in 1770 and an MA in 1773. He was returned to the House of Commons for Salisbury upon his coming of age in 1771.

He succeeded his father as Earl of Radnor on 23 January 1776 and as Recorder of Salisbury on 13 March 1776. On 15 February 1779, Radnor was made a Fellow of the Society of Antiquaries. He was commissioned as a captain in the Northampton Militia on 27 September 1779. On 30 November 1780, he was appointed a deputy lieutenant for Wiltshire, and, on 19 November 1791, Lord Lieutenant of Berkshire, a post he resigned in 1819 due to ill health. From 24 December 1791 to 8 May 1800, he was also colonel of the Berkshire Militia.

Radnor became a director of the French Hospital in 1789, later serving as governor. Successive Earls of Radnor were governors of the hospital from the eighteenth century to 2015.

On 12 February 1795, Radnor was made a Fellow of the Royal Society, and was appointed High Steward of Wallingford in 1799. On 20 January 1802, he was also appointed a deputy lieutenant of Kent. He died at Longford Castle in Wiltshire in 1828 and was succeeded by his eldest son.

== Family ==
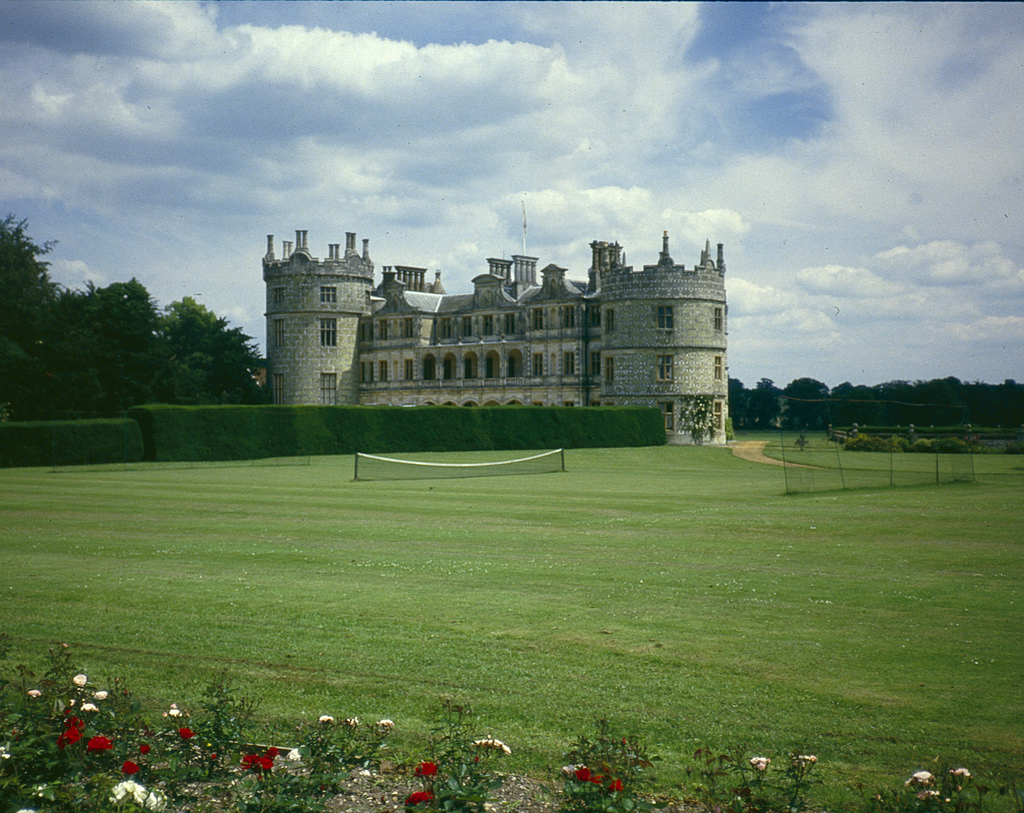
Longford Castle, seat of the Earls of Radnor

Radnor resided at Longford Castle and his mother's property, Coleshill House, and married Hon. Anne Duncombe, daughter of Anthony Duncombe, 1st Baron Feversham and Anne Hales, on 24 January 1777 and had seven children:

- Lady Mary Anne Pleydell-Bouverie (28 April 1778 – 5 October 1790)
- William Pleydell-Bouverie, 3rd Earl of Radnor (1 May 1779 – 9 April 1869)
- Hon. Duncombe Pleydell Pleydell-Bouverie (28 June 1780 – 5 November 1850)
- Hon. Lawrence Pleydell-Bouverie (6 August 1781 – 23 November 1811)
- Lady Harriet Pleydell-Bouverie (2 September 1782 – 31 December 1794)
- Lady Barbara Pleydell-Bouverie (17 October 1783 – 26 June 1798)
- Rev. Hon. Frederick Pleydell-Bouverie (16 November 1785 – 6 June 1857); married Elizabeth Sullivan, daughter of Sir Richard Sullivan, 1st Baronet. They had ten children.
- Hon. Philip Pleydell-Bouverie (21 October 1788 – 27 May 1872)

== Coat of arms ==
Coat of arms of Jacob Pleydell-Bouverie, 2nd Earl of Radnor
Coronet A coronet of an Earl Crest A demi-eagle with two heads displayed sable, ducally gorged or, and charged on the breast with a cross crosslet argent. Escutcheon Quarterly: 1st and 4th, per fesse or and argent, an eagle displayed, with two heads sable, on the breast an escutcheon gules, charged with a bend vair (Bouverie); 2nd and 3rd, argent a bend gules, guttée d’eau between two ravens sable, a chief checky, or and sable (Pleydell). Supporters Two eagles reguardant, wings elevated sable, ducally gorged or, each charged on the breast with a cross crosslet argent. Motto Patria cara carior libertas. (My country is dear, liberty is dearer.)

Parliament of Great Britain
Preceded by Hon. Edward Bouverie; Hon. Stephen Fox	Member of Parliament for Salisbury; 1771–1776; With: Hon. Stephen Fox 1771–1774; William Hussey 1774–1776	Succeeded by William Hussey; Hon. William Henry Bouverie
Honorary titles
Preceded by The Lord Craven	Lord Lieutenant of Berkshire; 1791–1819	Succeeded by The Earl of Craven
Peerage of Great Britain
Preceded by William Bouverie	Earl of Radnor; 1776–1828	Succeeded by William Pleydell-Bouverie
