= Henry Bouverie =

British Army general

Lieutenant-General Sir Henry Bouverie GCB GCMG
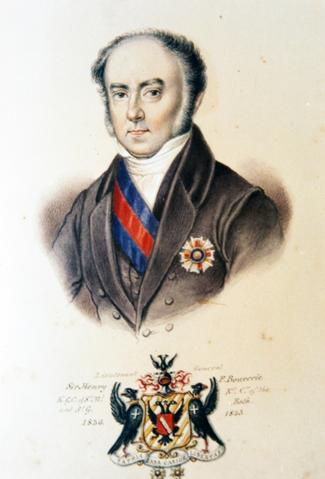
- Born: 11 July 1783
- Died: 14 November 1852 (aged 69)
- Military career
- Allegiance: United Kingdom
- Branch: British Army
- Rank: Lieutenant-General
- Commands: Northern District
- Conflicts: Peninsular War
- Awards: Knight Grand Cross of the Order of the Bath; Knight Grand Cross of the Order of St Michael and St George

Lieutenant-General Sir Henry Frederick Bouverie (11 July 1783 – 14 November 1852) was a British Army officer.

== Military career ==
He was the son of Edward Bouverie, of Delapré Abbey, Hardingstone, in Northamptonshire, and his wife, Harriet Fawkener, the only daughter and sole heiress of Sir Everard Fawkener; and nephew of the 1st Earl of Radnor. Bouverie was educated at Eton College and commissioned a cornet in the 2nd Dragoon Guards in 1799, transferring to the Coldstream Guards as an ensign a few months later. He spent the rest of his regimental career in the Coldstreams.

For his services during the Peninsular War, he received the Army Gold Cross, with one clasp, for the battles of Salamanca, Vitoria, San Sebastian, the Nive, and Orthez. He became General Officer Commanding Northern Command in 1828 and Governor of Malta in 1836.

A stained east window was erected to the General on 9 February 1869 at St Edmunds Church, Hardingstone, by the tenants and other inhabitants of the parish.

Military offices
Preceded by Sir John Byng	GOC Northern District; 1828–1836	Succeeded by Sir Richard Jackson
Government offices
Preceded by Sir Frederick Ponsonby	Governor of Malta; 1836–1843	Succeeded by Sir Patrick Stuart
