= Bouverie, Port Glasgow =

Area of Port Glasgow, Inverclyde, Scotland

Coordinates: 55°55′55″N 4°40′52″W

Bouverie is an area of the town of Port Glasgow, Inverclyde, Scotland.

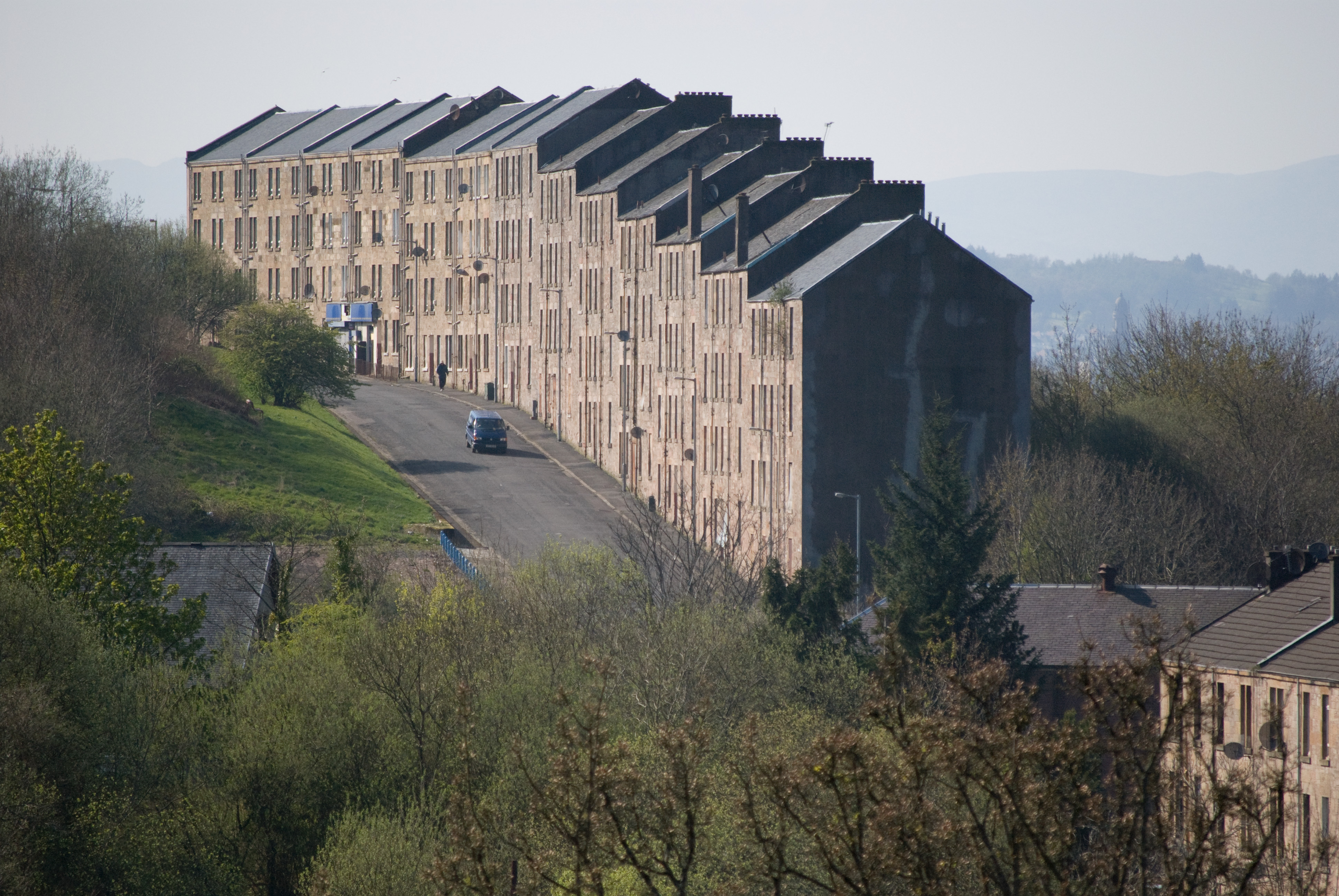
The Bouverie tenements

Bouverie was developed in the late nineteenth century as part of Port Glasgow's eastward expansion. Originally consisting of ancillary shipbuilding-related businesses, and workers' housing, it now consists mainly of residential buildings and a handful of small service industries. Including Bouverie Motors, the owner of which bought much of the lands of the disused Gourock Ropeworks mill site. The land banks steeply upward towards the twentieth century housing areas of Whitecroft and Bridgend in upper Port Glasgow, and has impressive views over the River Clyde.

Bouverie is situated behind the site of the former Gourock Ropeworks mill, which is now loft apartments, with a retail establishment on the grounds. The street was bombed during the second world war, but contrary to popular local belief, historic maps show that Bouverie never had tenements running the full length of both sides of the street.

The Bouverie Street tenements were demolished in 2014.

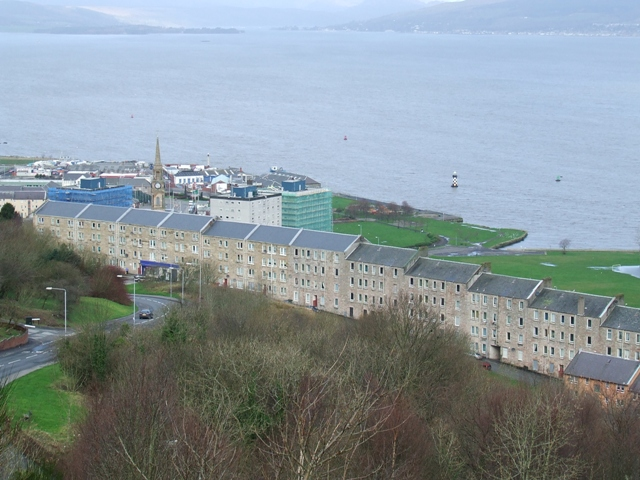
Bouverie from Ardmore Road

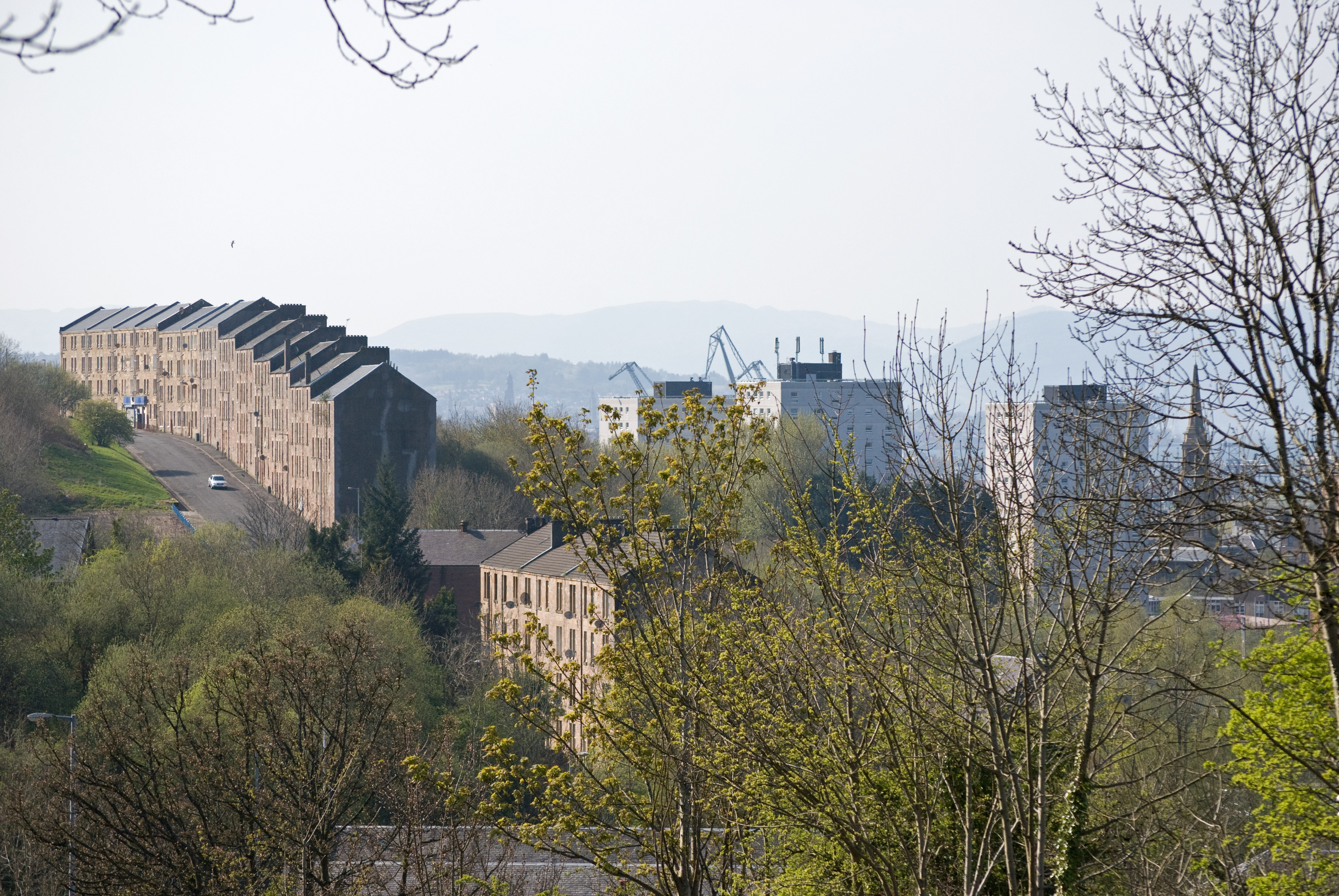
Bouverie looks out over Bay Street; with the spire of Port Glasgow town buildings to the right

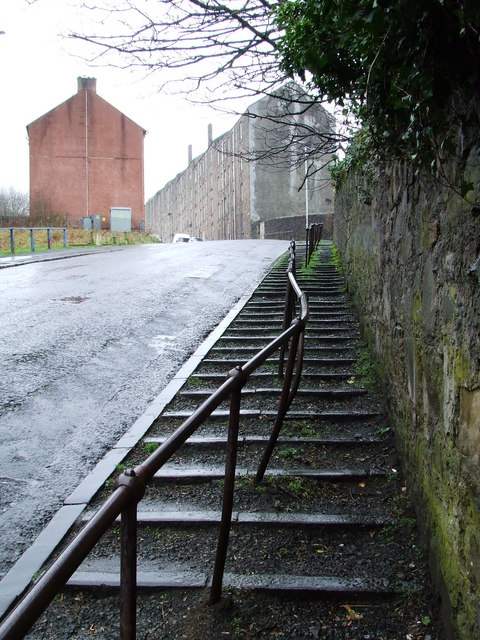
Steps and handrail for pedestrians at the steepest part of the hill

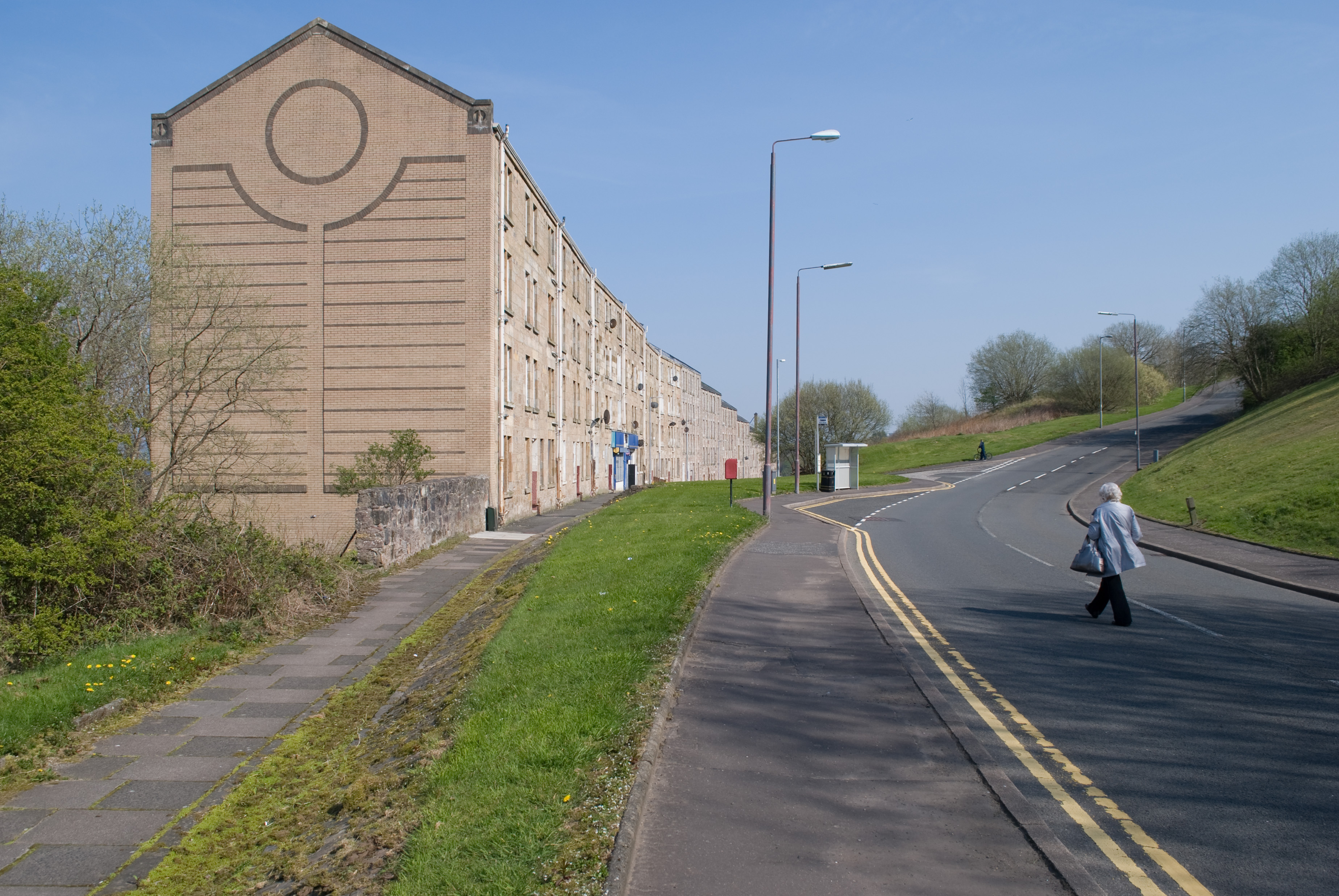
The west gable end

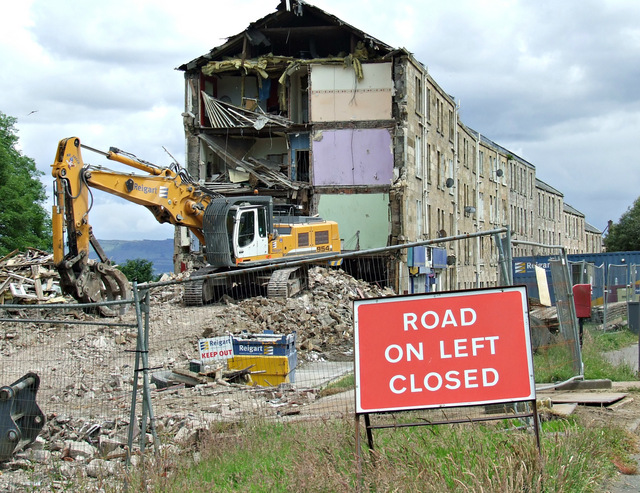
Demolition in 2014
