= Julines Beckford =

British politician and planter

Julines Beckford (c. 1717 – c. 1764) was a British politician and planter who sat in the Parliament of Great Britain representing the parliamentary constituency of Salisbury from 1754 to 1764. He was the brother of fellow politician William Beckford. Beckford also owned several slave plantations in the British colony of Jamaica.
