= Sir Thomas Cave, 7th Baronet =

British politician

Sir Thomas Cave, Bt

Member of Parliament for Leicestershire
- In office 1790–1792 Serving with William Pochin
- Preceded by: William Pochin; John Peach-Hungerford
- Succeeded by: William Pochin; Penn Assheton Curzon

Personal details
- Born: 6 October 1766
- Died: 15 January 1792 (aged 25)
- Spouse: Lady Lucy Sherard (m. 1791)
- Parent(s): Sir Thomas Cave, 6th Baronet; Sarah Edwards
- Education: Christ Church, Oxford

Sir Thomas Cave, 7th Baronet (6 October 1766 – 15 January 1792) was a British politician.

== Early life ==
The son of Sir Thomas Cave, 6th Baronet and Sarah Edwards, he succeeded to his father's baronetcy in 1780. Cave was educated at the Christ Church, Oxford, where he matriculated in 1785.

== Career ==
His grandfather had represented Leicestershire in the Parliament of 1741, before Cave was chosen in 1790, on the retirement of John Peach-Hungerford, on the same independent interest through the support of Lord Harborough, his future father-in-law. Cave made no mark in Parliament, where he supported Pitt, and was listed hostile to the repeal of the Test Act in Scotland in April 1791.

== Personal life ==
On 3 June 1791, Sir Thomas was married to Lady Lucy Sherard (d. 1858), daughter of Robert Sherard, 4th Earl of Harborough and the former Jane Reeve, the daughter of his friend William Reeve of Melton Mowbray.

After a short illness, he died, aged only 25 on 15 January 1792. He was buried in Stanford on Avon in Northamptonshire on 27 January 1792. He was succeeded by his younger brother Charles. After his death, his widow remarried to the Hon. Philip Bouverie-Pusey (1746–1828), the eldest son of Jacob Bouverie, 1st Viscount Folkestone, by his second wife, the Hon. Elizabeth Marsham (eldest daughter of Robert Marsham, 1st Baron Romney), in 1798.

Parliament of Great Britain
Preceded by William Pochin; John Peach-Hungerford	Member of Parliament for Leicestershire; 1790–1792; With: William Pochin	Succeeded by William Pochin; Penn Assheton Curzon
Baronetage of England
Preceded by Thomas Cave	Baronet (of Stanford); 1780–1792	Succeeded by Charles Cave
