= William Bouverie, 1st Earl of Radnor =

British peer

The Right Honourable The Earl of Radnor FRS DL
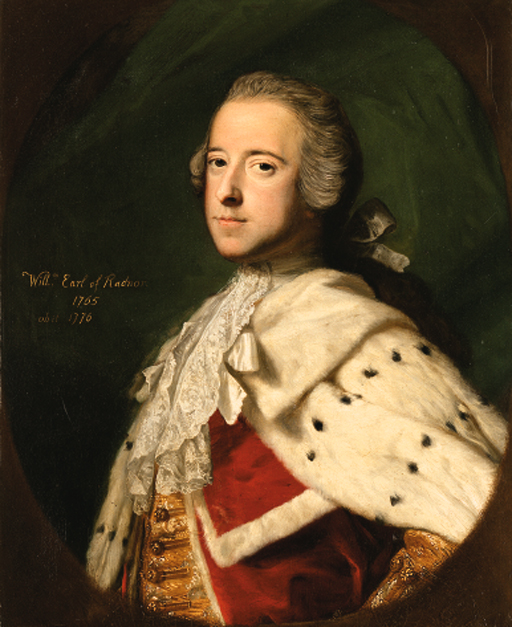

Member of Parliament for Salisbury
- In office 1747–1761 Serving with Edward Poore, Julines Beckford
- Preceded by: Sir Jacob Bouverie; Sir Edward Seymour
- Succeeded by: Julines Beckford; Hon. Edward Bouverie

Personal details
- Born: William Bouverie; 26 February 1725
- Died: 28 January 1776 (aged 50)
- Spouse(s): Harriet Pleydell (m. 1748; died 1750) Rebecca Alleyne (m. 1751; died 1764) Anne Duncome, Baroness Feversham (m. 1765; died 1776)
- Parent(s): Jacob Bouverie, 1st Viscount Folkestone; Mary Clarke
- Education: University College, Oxford

William Bouverie, 1st Earl of Radnor FRS DL (26 February 1725 – 28 January 1776) was a British peer, styled Hon. William Bouverie from 1747 until 1761.

== Early life ==
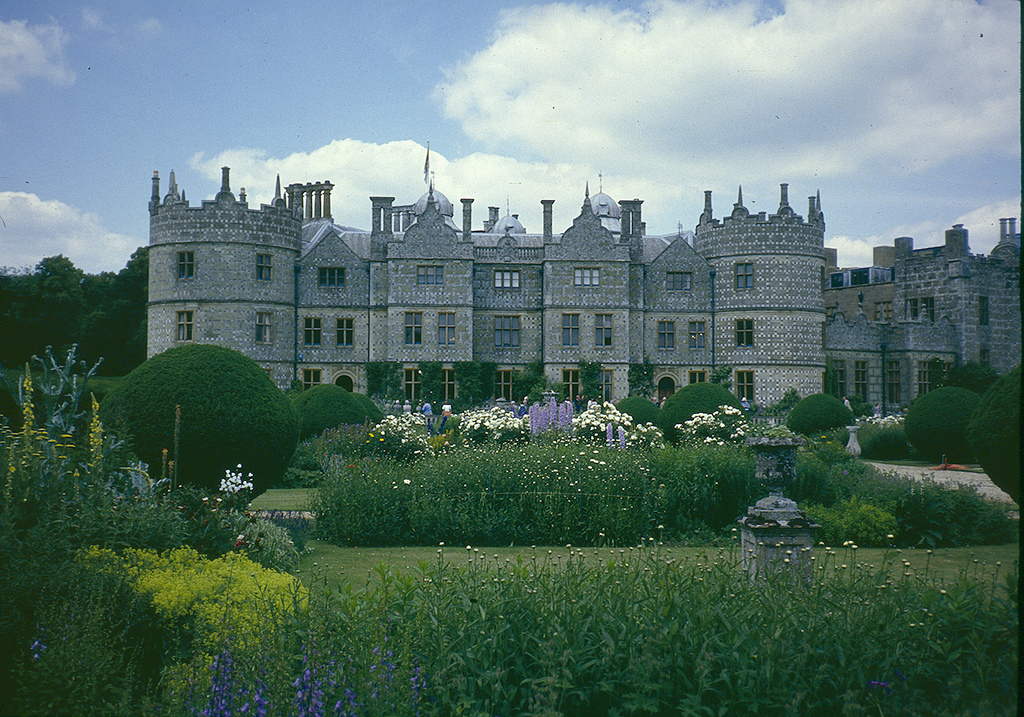
Longford Castle, Wiltshire – seat of the Earls of Radnor

He was the eldest son of Jacob Bouverie, 1st Viscount Folkestone and Mary Clarke (the daughter of Bartholomew Clarke, merchant of Hardingstone and Mary (née Young), sister and sole heir to Hitch Younge MP).

His paternal grandparents were Sir William des Bouverie, 1st Baronet, and, his second wife, Anne Urry (daughter and heiress of David Urry of London).

He was educated at University College, Oxford.

== Career ==
On 8 November 1750, he was appointed a deputy lieutenant of Wiltshire. On 22 September 1758, he was appointed a deputy lieutenant of Berkshire. He succeeded his father as Viscount Folkestone on 17 February 1761 and in the office of Recorder of Salisbury on 14 April 1761. On 31 October 1765, he was created Earl of Radnor and Baron Pleydell-Bouverie.

Radnor was appointed a Fellow of the Royal Society on 17 December 1767. He was elected governor of the French Hospital in 1770, the first of nine earls of Radnor to serve successively in this capacity.

== Personal life ==
Lord Radnor was married three times. His first marriage was on 14 January 1748 to Harriet Pleydell, daughter of Sir Mark Stuart Pleydell, 1st Baronet and Mary Stuart. Before her death on 29 May 1750, they had one son:

- Jacob Pleydell-Bouverie, 2nd Earl of Radnor (1750–1828), who married Hon. Anne Duncombe, daughter of Anthony Duncombe, 1st Baron Feversham and Anne Hales, in 1777.

He married, secondly, Rebecca Alleyne (1725–1764), daughter of John Alleyne, on 5 September 1751. Before her death on 4 May 1764, they were the parents of three sons:

- Hon. William Henry Bouverie (1752–1806), who married Lady Bridget Douglas, daughter of James Douglas, 14th Earl of Morton and Bridget Heathcote, in 1777.
- Hon. Bartholomew Bouverie (1753–1835), who married Mary Wyndham Arundell, daughter of Hon. James Everard Arundell and Ann Wyndham, in 1779.
- Hon. Edward Bouverie (1760–1824), who married Lady Catherine Murray, daughter of John Murray, 4th Earl of Dunmore and Lady Charlotte Stewart, in 1782. After her death, he married Arabella Ogle, daughter of Adm. Sir Chaloner Ogle, 1st Baronet and Hester Thomas, in 1785.

On 22 July 1765, he married Anne Duncome, Baroness Feversham (née Hales) (1736–1795), daughter of Sir Thomas Hales, 3rd Baronet and widow of Anthony Duncombe, 1st Baron Feversham. They were the parents of two daughters who died in infancy.

Lord Radnor died on 28 January 1776 and was succeeded in his titles by his eldest son, Jacob, who married the daughter of the 1st Earl's widow the following year.

== Coat of arms ==
Coat of arms of William Bouverie, 1st Earl of Radnor
Notes Arms granted by Royal Licence of George III on the 26th February 1768. Coronet A coronet of an Earl Crest A demi eagle displayed with two heads sable gorged with a ducal coronet or, and charged on the breast with a cross crosslet argent Escutcheon Per fesse or and argent an eagle displayed with two heads sable, on the breast an escutcheon gules charged with a bend vair. Supporters On either side an eagle reguardant wings elevated sable gorged with a ducal coronet or, charged on the breast with a cross crosslet argent Motto Patria cara carior libertas. Previous versions

Parliament of Great Britain
Preceded by Sir Jacob Bouverie; Sir Edward Seymour	Member of Parliament for Salisbury; 1747–1761; With: Edward Poore 1747–1754; Julines Beckford 1754–1761	Succeeded by Julines Beckford; Hon. Edward Bouverie
Peerage of Great Britain
New creation	Earl of Radnor; 1765–1776	Succeeded by Jacob Pleydell-Bouverie
Preceded by Jacob Bouverie	Viscount Folkestone; 1761–1776	Succeeded by Jacob Pleydell-Bouverie
