= Edward Poore =

Edward Poore (c. 1704 – 1780) was the member of the Parliament of Great Britain for Salisbury for the parliament of 1747 to 1754, and for Downton for 13 December 1756 to 1761.

A memorial to him in Salisbury Cathedral was sculpted by John Carline.
