= Earl of Radnor =

British peer

Earldom of Radnor
- Arms: Quarterly, 1st and 4th, per fesse or and ar. an eagle displ. with two heads sa., on the breast an escutcheon gu. charged with a bend vair (being the ancient arms of Bouverie, confirmed and allowed to be thus borne by royal sign-manual in 1798); 2nd and 3rd, ar. a bend gu. gutte d’eau betw. two ravens sa., a chief chequy or, and of the last, for Pleydell
- Creation date: 1765
- Creation: Second
- Created by: George III
- Peerage: Peerage of Great Britain
- First holder: William Bouverie, 2nd Viscount Folkestone
- Present holder: William Pleydell-Bouverie, 9th Earl of Radnor
- Heir apparent: Jacob Pleydell-Bouverie, Viscount Folkestone
- Subsidiary titles: Viscounts Folkestone; Baronets of St Catherine Cree Church /Baron Longford /Baron Pleydell-Bouverie
- Seats: Longford Castle; Alward House
- Former seat: Coleshill House

Earl of Radnor, of the County of Radnor, is a title which has been created twice. It was first created in the Peerage of England in 1679 for John Robartes, 2nd Baron Robartes, a notable political figure of the reign of Charles II. The earldom was created for a second time in the Peerage of Great Britain in 1765 for William Bouverie, 2nd Viscount Folkestone.

The Bouverie family descends from William des Bouverie, a prominent London merchant. He was created a baronet of St Catherine Cree Church, London, in the Baronetage of Great Britain in 1714. His eldest son, the second Baronet, represented Shaftesbury in the House of Commons. He was succeeded by his younger brother, the third Baronet. He sat as Member of Parliament for Salisbury until he was raised to the Peerage of Great Britain as Baron Longford and Viscount Folkestone in 1747.

His son, the second Viscount, also represented Salisbury in Parliament. In 1765 he was made Baron Pleydell-Bouverie, of Coleshill in the County of Berkshire, and Earl of Radnor. The earldom was created with remainder, failing heirs male of his body, to the heirs male of his father. Both peerages were in the Peerage of Great Britain. He was succeeded by his son, the second Earl. He was Member of Parliament for Salisbury and served as Lord Lieutenant of Berkshire. The second Earl assumed the additional surname of Pleydell after succeeding to the estates of his maternal grandfather, Sir Mark Stuart Pleydell, 1st Baronet (see Pleydell Baronets). His son, the third Earl, represented Downton and Salisbury in the House of Commons. On his death the titles passed to his son, the fourth Earl. He served as Lord Lieutenant of Wiltshire.

He was succeeded by his son, the fifth Earl. He sat as Conservative Member of Parliament for South Wiltshire and Enfield and held political office as Treasurer of the Household from 1885 to 1886 under Lord Salisbury. His son, the sixth Earl, represented Wilton (also known as South Wiltshire) in Parliament as a Conservative and served as Lord Lieutenant of Wiltshire. He was succeeded by his son, the seventh Earl. He notably held the honorary posts of Keeper of the Privy Seal and Lord Warden of the Stannaries and was made a Knight of the Garter in 1962. As of 2009, the titles are held by his grandson, also William Pleydell-Bouverie, the 9th Earl of Radnor, who succeeded his father in 2008.

Successive Earls of Radnor were governors of the French Hospital from the eighteenth century to 2015.

The family seats are Longford Castle, near Salisbury, Wiltshire, and Alward House, near Alderbury, Wiltshire. Before 1952, another seat was Coleshill House in Coleshill, Berkshire (presently Oxfordshire).

== Barons Robartes, first creation (1625) ==
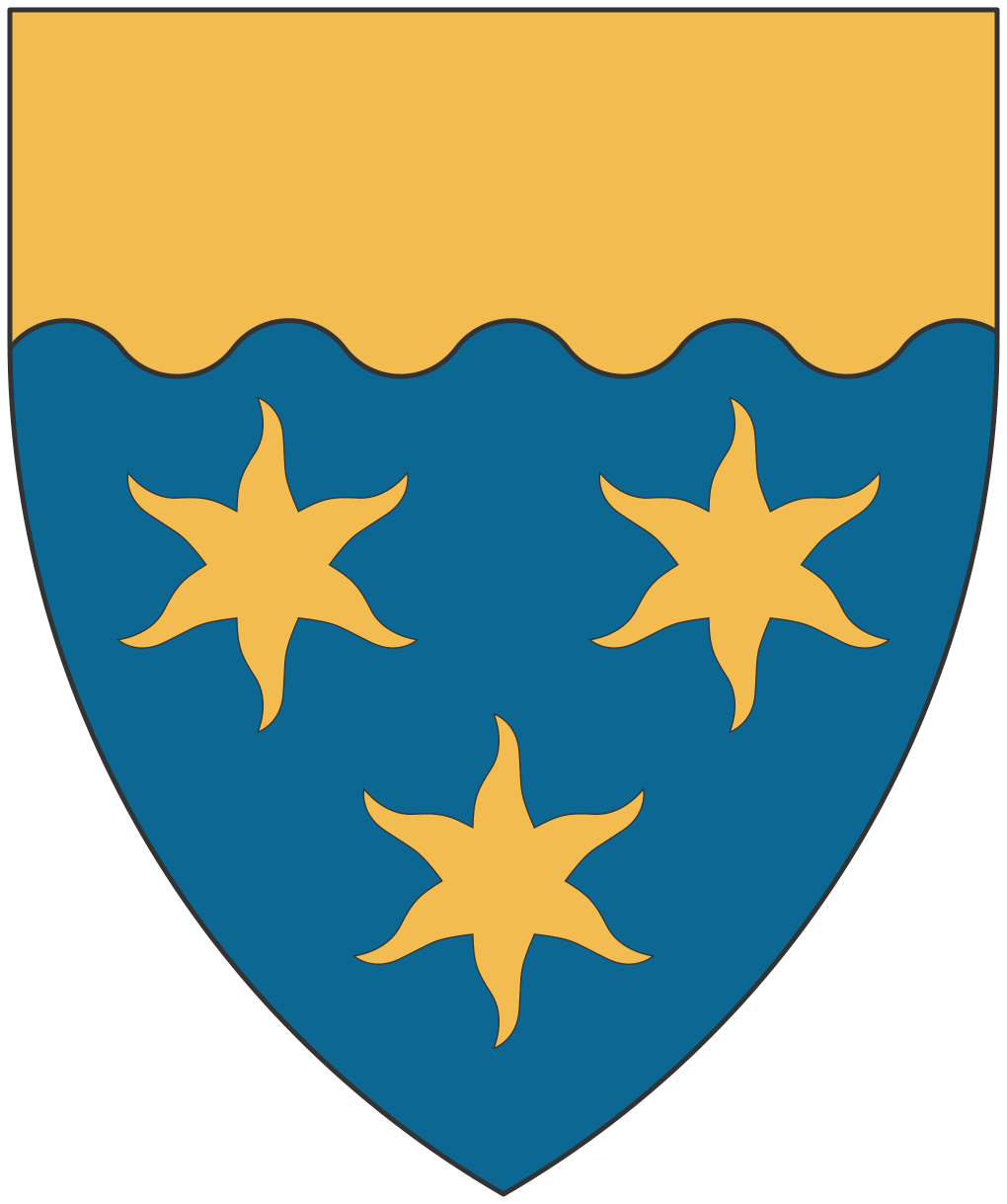
The coat of arms of the Robartes of Truro.

- Richard Robartes, 1st Baron Robartes (d. 1634)
- John Robartes, 2nd Baron Robartes (1606–1685) (created Earl of Radnor in 1679)

== Earls of Radnor, first creation (1679) ==
- John Robartes, 1st Earl of Radnor (1606–1685)
  - Robert Robartes, Viscount Bodmin (1634–1682)
- Charles Bodvile Robartes, 2nd Earl of Radnor (1660–1723)
- Henry Robartes, 3rd Earl of Radnor (1695–1741)
- John Robartes, 4th Earl of Radnor (1686–1757)

== Des Bouverie baronets, of St Catherine Cree Church (1714) ==
- Sir William des Bouverie, 1st Baronet (1656–1717)
- Sir Edward des Bouverie, 2nd Baronet (c. 1690–1736)
- Sir Jacob des Bouverie, 3rd Baronet (1694–1761) (created Viscount Folkestone in 1747)

== Viscounts Folkestone (1747) ==
- Jacob des Bouverie, 1st Viscount Folkestone (1694–1761)
- William Bouverie, 2nd Viscount Folkestone (1725–1776) (created Earl of Radnor in 1765)

== Earls of Radnor, second creation (1765) ==
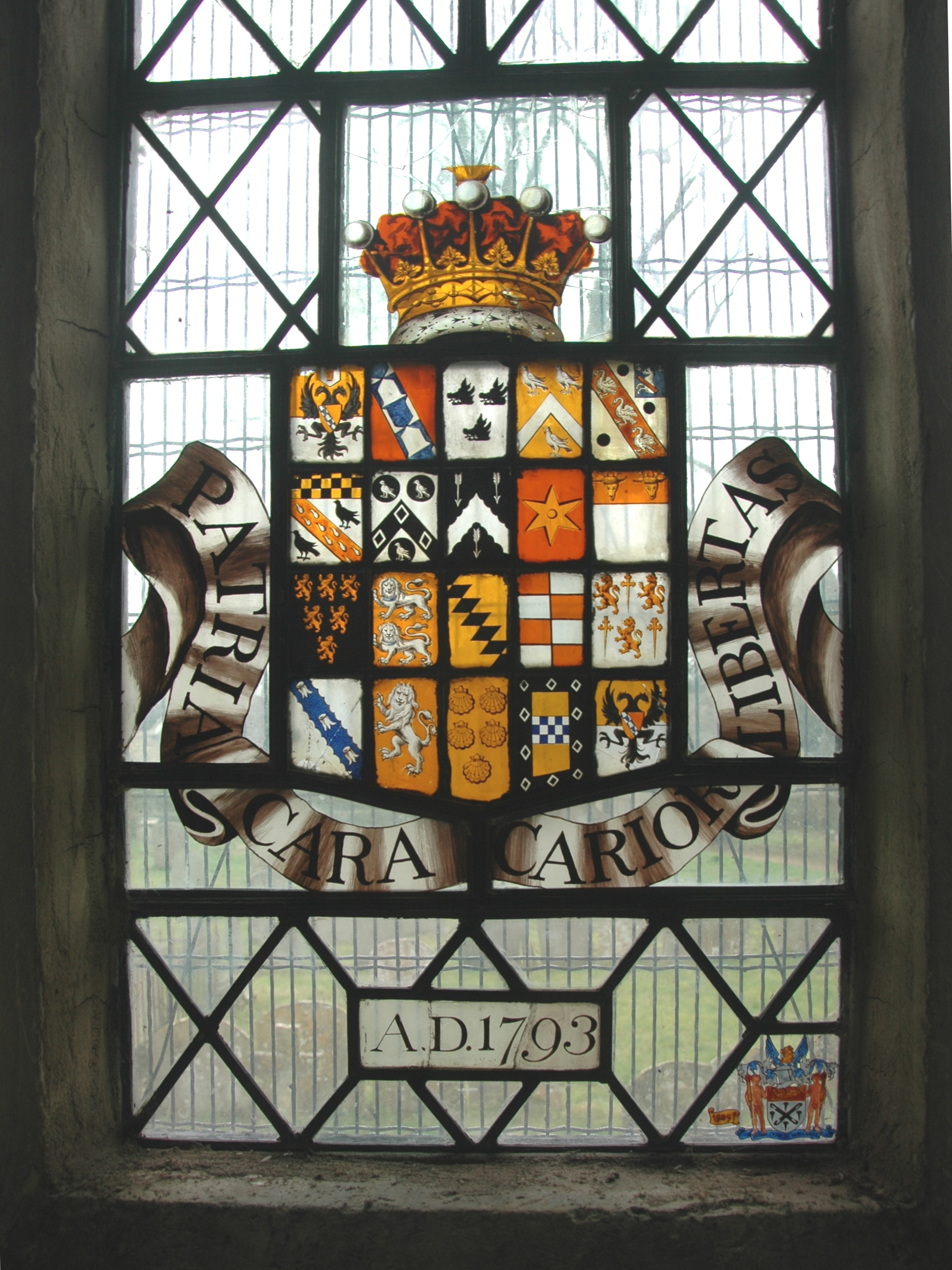
Coat of arms of Jacob Pleydell-Bouverie, 2nd Earl of Radnor, dated 1793, in the east window of the chancel of St. Andrew's parish church, Shrivenham

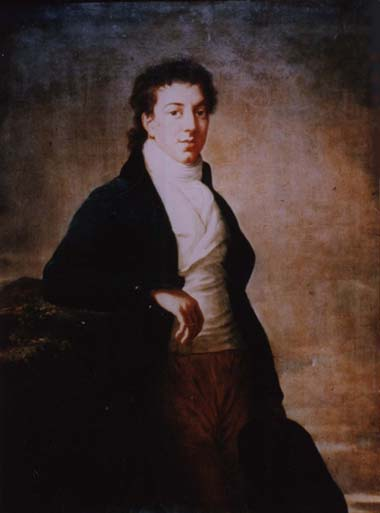
William Pleydell-Bouverie, 3rd Earl of Radnor

- William Bouverie, 1st Earl of Radnor (1725–1776)
- Jacob Pleydell-Bouverie, 2nd Earl of Radnor (1750–1828)
- William Pleydell-Bouverie, 3rd Earl of Radnor (1779–1869)
- Jacob Pleydell-Bouverie, 4th Earl of Radnor (1815–1889)
- William Pleydell-Bouverie, 5th Earl of Radnor (1841–1900)
- Jacob Pleydell-Bouverie, 6th Earl of Radnor (1868–1930)
- William Pleydell-Bouverie, 7th Earl of Radnor (1895–1968)
- Jacob Pleydell-Bouverie, 8th Earl of Radnor (1927–2008)
- William Pleydell-Bouverie, 9th Earl of Radnor (born 1955)

== Present peer ==
William Pleydell-Bouverie, 9th Earl of Radnor (born 5 January 1955) is the eldest son of the 8th Earl and his wife Anne Garden Farquharson Seth-Smith. Styled as Viscount Folkestone from 1968, he was educated at Harrow School and the Royal Agricultural College, Cirencester. In 2003, he was living at Alward House, Alderbury, Wiltshire.

In 2008 Folkestone succeeded his father as Earl of Radnor (G.B., 1765), Viscount Folkestone (G.B., 1747), and Baron Longford (G.B., 1747), and Baron Pleydell-Bouverie (G.B., 1765). He also inherited a baronetcy, Bouverie of St. Catherine Cree Church, London (G.B., 1714). In 1996 he married Melissa Stanford, only daughter of James Keith Edward Stanford. They have five children.

=== Ancestry and extended family ===
In an episode of the Dutch television show Verborgen Verleden (similar to the British Who Do You Think You Are?) broadcast in November 2014, the Dutch architect Jan des Bouvrie found that his family was descended from Jehan de le Bouvrie (born about 1480), of Sainghin-en-Mélantois, where in 1543 his widow, Jeanne de la Motte, inherited a farm with four cows and two horses. A grandson of Jehan, the merchant Lawrence de Bouverie, born in Sainghin, migrated to England, where his descendant William des Bouverie was created a baronet and became the ancestor of the Earls of Radnor. Jan des Bouvrie hoped to meet the present-day Lord Radnor, but he would not agree to meet him for the television show.

== See also ==
- Baron Robartes (1869 creation)
- Pleydell baronets

== Notes ==
Baronetage of Great Britain
Preceded by Evelyn baronets	Des Bouverie baronets of St Catherine Cree Church; 19 February 1714	Succeeded by Cope baronets
