= Edward des Bouverie =

British landowner and Tory politician

Sir Edward des Bouverie, 2nd Baronet (1688 – 21 November 1736) was a British landowner and Tory politician who sat in the House of Commons from 1719 to 1734. In 1717 he inherited his title three years after its grant to his father, and his combined wealth enabled him to purchase Longford Castle in Wiltshire, which later became a home of his brother's most senior descendants and has been in the family for more than 300 years.

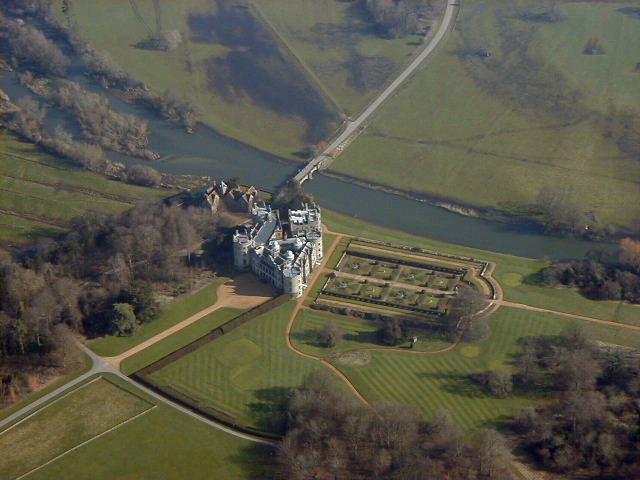
des Bouverie bought Longford Castle; one tower was demolished and great extensions were carried out by later generations of the family – mainly as Earls of Radnor (a title recreated in 1765 for his great-nephew)

== Early life ==
des Bouverie was born in 1688, the eldest son of London merchant Sir William des Bouverie and his second wife Anne Urry. The des Bouverie family was Huguenot and came to England in the 16th century settling at Canterbury. He trained as a merchant and was sent as an apprentice at the age of 12 to an uncle Sir Christopher des Bouverie at Aleppo. For a time he ran his own cloth business in Cyprus.

His father was created a baronet in the Baronetage of Great Britain in 1714. Edward des Bouverie succeeded on his father's death in the baronetcy on 19 May 1717, in which year he purchased the estate of Longford Castle, in Britford, south Wiltshire from Lord Coleraine. Longford has been the home of his brother's patrilineal descendants ever since. He married on 7 July 1718, in the chapel at Somerset House, Strand, London, Mary Smyth, the second daughter of John Smyth, of Beaufort buildings on the Strand, and his wife Elizabeth Mulsho. Her father was Commissioner of Excise and her elder sister, Anne Smyth married Michael Burke, 10th Earl of Clanricarde.

== Political career ==
Longford Castle is 19 miles (30 km) east of Shaftesbury (across Cranborne Chase). des Bouverie was returned as a Tory Member of Parliament for Shaftesbury on 24 January 1719 on petition after a by-election. He was re-elected MP for Shaftesbury at the general elections of 1722 and 1727. In Parliament, he consistently voted with the Opposition against the Whig government. He did not stand in the general election of 1734.

== Death and legacy ==
des Bouverie died on 21 November 1736 at Aix-en-Provence aged 47 or 48. His wife Lady Mary had died on 3 January 1721, and was buried at Britford. They had no issue and on Sir Edward's death, he was succeeded by his younger brother Jacob. He was buried at Britford.

Parliament of Great Britain
Preceded by William Benson; Edward Nicholas	Member of Parliament for Shaftesbury; 1719 – 1734; With: Edward Nicholas to 1726; Stephen Fox 1726–34	Succeeded by Jacob Banks; Philip Bennet
Baronetage of Great Britain
Preceded by William des Bouverie	Baronet (of St Catherine Cree Church); 1717–1736	Succeeded by Jacob des Bouverie
