= Longford Castle =

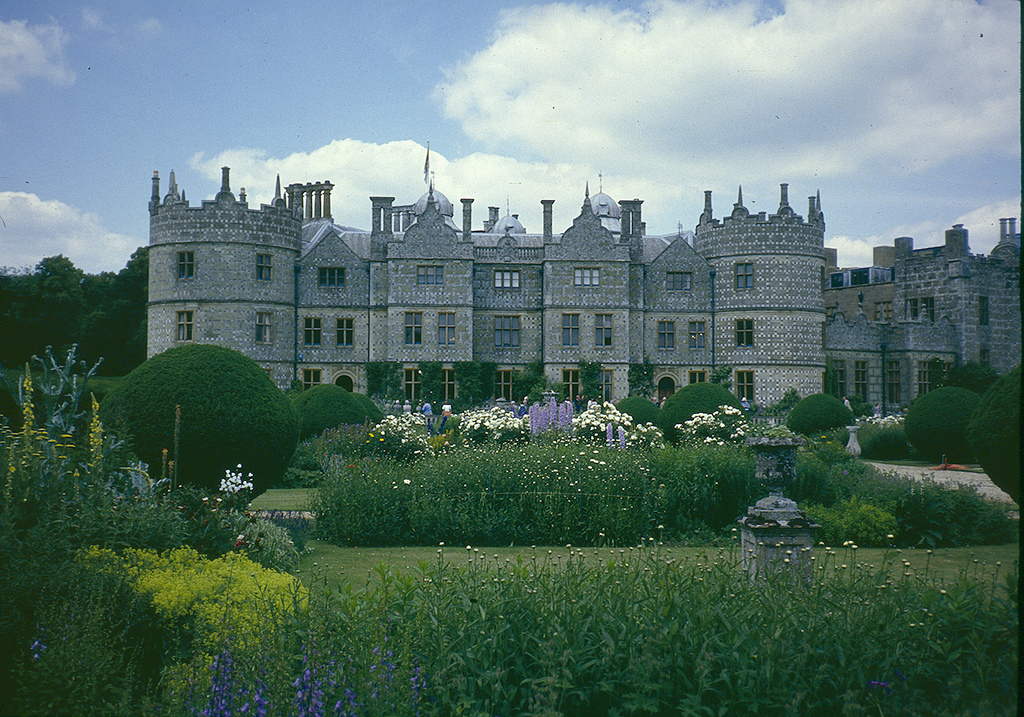
- Longford Castle

Quick reference
Location within Wiltshire
51°2′21.0″N 1°45′24.93″W
Type	Prodigy house
Location	Wiltshire, England
History
Built	c.1576–1591, 1802-1817
Built for	Thomas Gorges and The 2nd Earl of Radnor
Site notes
Architect(s)	John Thorpe and James Wyatt
Architectural styles	Elizabethan and Gothic Revival architecture
Restored	1870s
Restored by	Anthony Salvin
Owner	Earl of Radnor
Website	www.longfordestates.co.uk
Listed Building – Grade I
Official name	Longford Castle
Designated	23 March 1960
Reference no.	1355742
National Register of Historic Parks and Gardens
Official name	Longford Castle
Designated	1 September 1987
Reference no.	1000424

Longford Castle is a Grade I listed country house on the banks of the River Avon south of Salisbury, Wiltshire, England. It is the seat of the Earl of Radnor and an example of the Elizabethan prodigy house.

== History ==
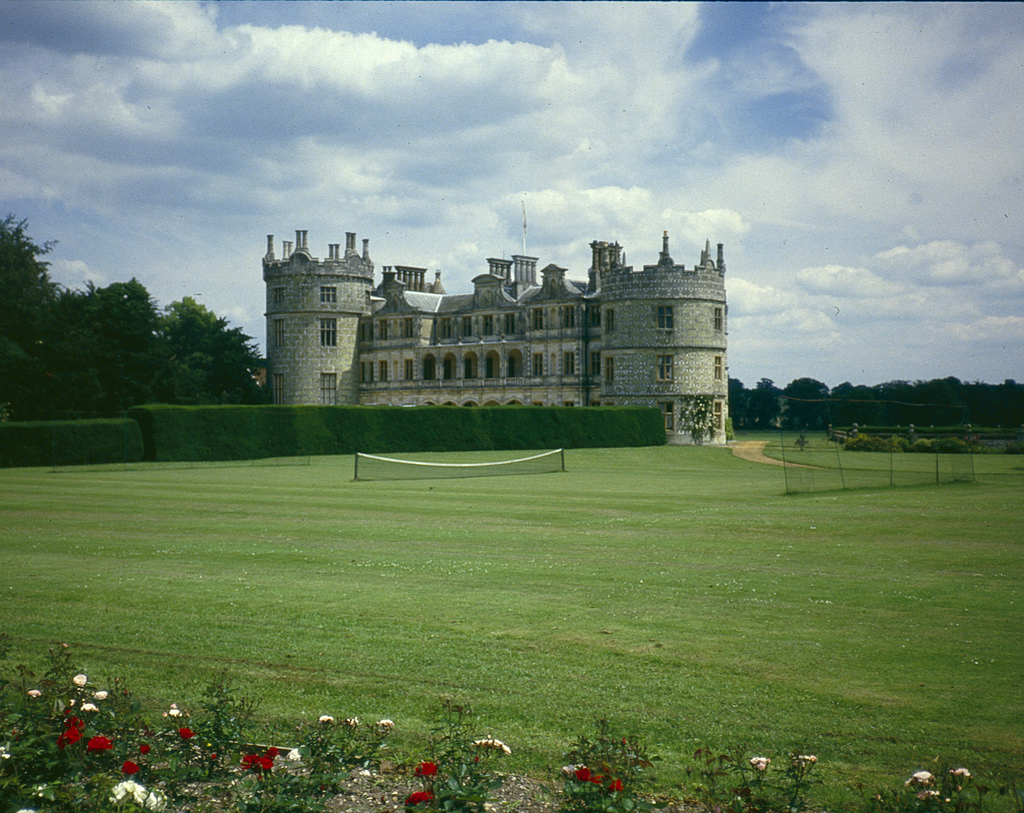
Rear of Longford Castle

In 1573 Thomas Gorges acquired the manor (at the time written "Langford"), which was originally owned by the Servington (or Cervington) family. Prior to this the existing mansion house had been damaged by fire. In c.1576 Thomas Gorges married Helena Snakenborg, the Swedish-born dowager Marchioness of Northampton and Lady-in-waiting to Queen Elizabeth. They rebuilt the Longford property as a triangular Swedish pattern castle on the banks of the River Avon. The building work became costly due to difficulties with the subsoil.

Sir Thomas Gorges, who was now governor of Hurst Castle, Hampshire, persuaded his wife to beg of the Queen a shipwreck he knew from the defeated Spanish Armada. The gift was granted and the gold and silver retrieved from the shipwreck funded the completion of the castle under the final supervision of John Thorpe in 1591. The family lived in the castle for several years before its final completion.

In September 1603 the royal family came on progress nearby and Roger Wilbraham described Longford as "a faire new house of stone, a triangle with three great towers at each end, wherein are his favourite chambers, & he hath the fairest garden and green walks". The main building had several floors and was triangular with a round tower at each corner; the three towers representing the Father, the Son and the Holy Ghost. There was a chapel, kitchen department, several boudoirs and sitting rooms, as well as bedrooms. Fresh cold water was pumped to various floors and there were water closets supplied with rainwater. A park, fruit garden and kitchen garden were attached.

In 1717 Longford Castle became the Bouverie home, purchased by Sir Edward des Bouverie from the Coleraines. It is said that Sir Edward saw and fell in love with the castle in the valley as he rode past, having enough money in his saddle bags to effect the purchase there and then. Subsequent generations of the family beautified the interior of the castle and surrounding park; by 1773 the castle was surrounded by a formal park, laid out with avenues and rides. Landscaping advice was sought from Capability Brown around 1777.

However, Jacob, 2nd Earl of Radnor (1749–1828), employed James Wyatt to change Longford from a reasonably modest chateau into a hexagonal palace "to the despair of future generations". He destroyed one of the Elizabethan towers and replaced it with a larger one of his own design, added two more towers and linked them to each other. In 1832 the 3rd Earl created a new formal garden to the south of the castle, in 17th-century style.

The palace concept was not finished: it was Jacob, 4th Earl of Radnor (1815–1889) who oversaw the last significant changes to the castle architecture, undertaken by Anthony Salvin. These included the formation of a second courtyard, the doming over of the central courtyard, the addition of a square tower, and alterations to the formal garden.

== Present day ==
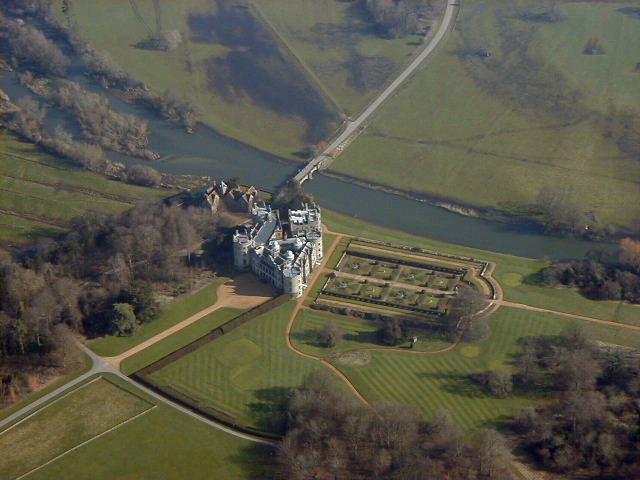
Longford Castle and the River Avon from the air

The castle is Grade I listed and is within Odstock parish. The formal garden, pleasure grounds and park extend into neighbouring parishes and are listed Grade II* on the Register of Historic Parks and Gardens.

The castle is the seat of William Pleydell-Bouverie, 9th Earl of Radnor. The castle, art collection and gardens are open to the public on select days each year, and guided tours may be booked through the National Gallery.

== Other notable uses ==
- Longford was the model for the "Castle of Amphialeus" in Sir Philip Sidney's The Countess of Pembroke's Arcadia (1580, pub. 1590).
- During World War I the castle was a hospital.
- During World War II the castle was occupied by British and American troops and entertained Field Marshal Bernard Montgomery, Gen. Mark Clark and Maj. Gen. Sir Michael O'Moore Creagh.
- Longford Castle is shown from the air at the end of the 2001 film The Princess Diaries as the castle in Genovia. It is also shown from the air in the sequel The Princess Diaries 2: Royal Engagement.

== See also ==
- Castles in Great Britain and Ireland
- List of castles in England
