= William des Bouverie =

English merchant (1656-1717)

Sir William des Bouverie, 1st Baronet (26 September 1656 – 19 May 1717), was a merchant in London and a baronet in the Baronetage of Great Britain.

He was the eldest of the seven sons of London Turkey merchant Sir Edward des Bouverie (died 2 April 1694, aged 72) of Cheshunt, Hertfordshire. His mother, Anne, was the daughter and co-heir of London merchant Jacob de la Forterie. He followed his father and grandfather into trade and amassed a large fortune. His father purchased the manor of Coulsdon from the Mason family in 1688.

William was created a baronet, of St Catherine Cree Church, London, on 19 February 1714.

He married twice: firstly (with a vicar general's licence dated 12 September 1682) Mary Edwards (born c. 1662), a daughter of James Edwards of St Stephen Coleman Street. She died without surviving issue, and Bouverie married secondly, on 29 April 1686 at Hackney, Anne Urry, the daughter of David Urry, of London, the son of John Urry, of Mill Place, on the Isle of Wight.

Bouverie died on 19 May 1717, aged sixty, and was buried at St Catherine Cree. His widow died aged 75 at Chelsea, Middlesex, on 5 June 1739 and was buried in the same church.

== Extended family ==
In the Dutch television show Verborgen Verleden based on Who Do You Think You Are?, architect and designer Jan des Bouvrie researched his patrilineage and found Jehan de le Bouvrie (born about 1480) and his widow, Jeanne de la Motte, who inherited a farm with four cows and two horses in Sainghin-en-Mélantois, Nord, France (in then-Flanders) in 1543. A grandson born there, merchant Lawrence de Bouverie, moved to England where his descendant Sir Edward des Bouverie bought Longford Castle by Salisbury Plain, Wiltshire in 1717.

Baronetage of Great Britain
New title	Baronet (of St Catherine Cree Church); 1714–1717	Succeeded by Edward des Bouverie
