= New Place, Shirrell Heath =

New Place
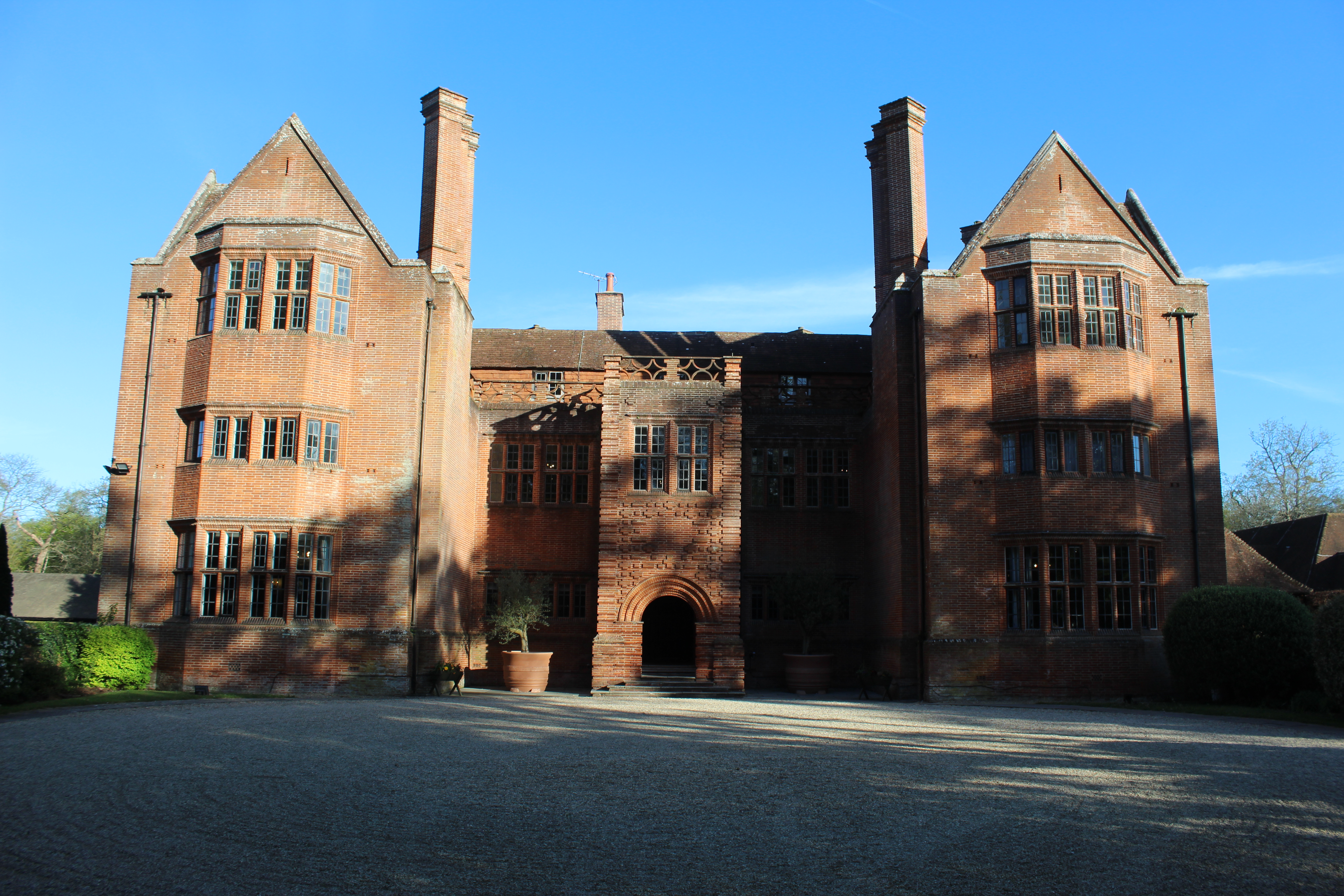
- New Place in 2026

- Location within Hampshire
- 50.9185°N 1.1953°W
- Type: Country House
- Location: Shirrell Heath

History
- Built: 1906

Site notes
- Area: Hampshire
- Architect: Edwin Lutyens
- Architectural style: Jacobethan
- Owner: Mokan Hotels

Listed Building – Grade I
- Official name: New Place, Shirrell Heath
- Designated: 3 February 1952
- Reference no.: 1095660

New Place, Shirrell Heath, Shedfield, Hampshire, England, is a former country house, now a hotel, designed by Edwin Lutyens. It is a Grade I listed building.

== History ==
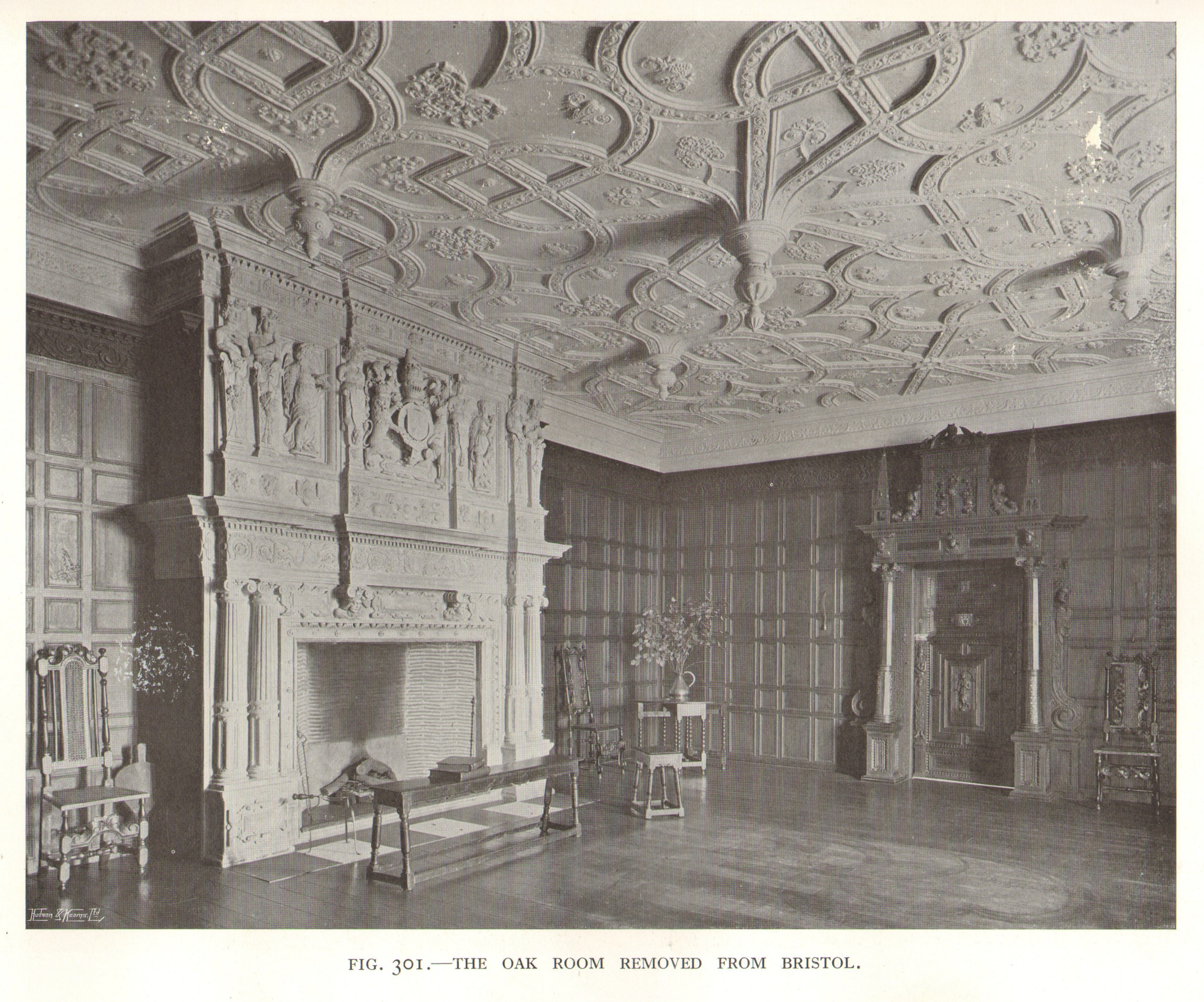
The Sate Room, removed from the Bristol mansion. From Weaver (1913)

New Place was commissioned by Mrs A. S. Franklyn in 1904. Resident in nearby Shedfield, Mrs Franklyn had inherited a large early 17th Century mansion, 12, Welsh Back, Bristol, which was scheduled for demolition. Wanting a new home in which to incorporate elements salvaged from the Bristol house, and to commemorate her ancestral connections with William Shakespeare, in 1904 she commissioned Edwin Lutyens to design a new house, named after New Place in Stratford-upon-Avon. The house was complete by 1906, with the contract for completion signed in a week in May of that year when Lutyens finalised four contracts on the same day. He described his triumph in a letter to his wife, written while on a train to Devon: "Hemingway has signed contract for £17,500, Dolgorouki accepts £15,000, Birds £7800, Mrs Franklin (sic) £9300. So this week, signed and sealed, £34,600". In 1908, Mrs Franklyn gave the house to her son, Henry Arden Franklyn, whose middle name recalled the family's Shakespearean connections through their descent from Shakespeare's mother, Mary Arden. In the 1950s, the house was sold and housed a prep school. Since the 1980s, it has operated as a hotel, under a number of managing companies.

== Architecture and description ==
The house is built entirely of dark-red brick, from the brickworks at Danehill, Hampshire. The central block is of two storeys, with three-story matching wings. The style is Jacobethan and Lutyens originally intended that the E-plan house would have stepped gables, styled after Montacute House in Somerset, but these were not constructed. The interior contains substantial fittings from Mrs Franklyn's Bristol mansion, including fireplaces, over mantels, doorcases, panelling and a staircase. (Note: The door to the Bristol Room dates from 1623 and represents a very early use of mahogany in England.) Lutyens admitted subsequently that he "did not much like the house", which is now a Grade I listed building.

== Sources ==
- Amery, Colin; Richardson, Margaret; Stamp, Gavin (1981). Lutyens: The Work of the English Architect Sir Edwin Lutyens. London: Arts Council of Great Britain. ISBN 9780728703032.
- Hussey, Christopher (1989) [1950]. The Life of Sir Edwin Lutyens. Woodbridge: Antique Collectors Club. ISBN 978-0-907462-59-0.
- Latham, Charles; Tipping, H. Avray (1907). In English Homes: The Internal Character, Furniture & Adornments of Some of the Most Notable Houses of England, Volume 2. London: Country Life.
- O'Brien, Charles; Bailey, Bruce; Pevsner, Nikolaus; Lloyd, David (2018). Hampshire (South). The Buildings of England. New Haven and London: Yale University Press. ISBN 9780300225037. OCLC 1056939855.
- Weaver, Lawrence (1913). Houses and Gardens by E.L. Lutyens. London: Country Life.
