= Coleshill House =

Country house in England

Coordinates: 51.6417°N 1.6553°W

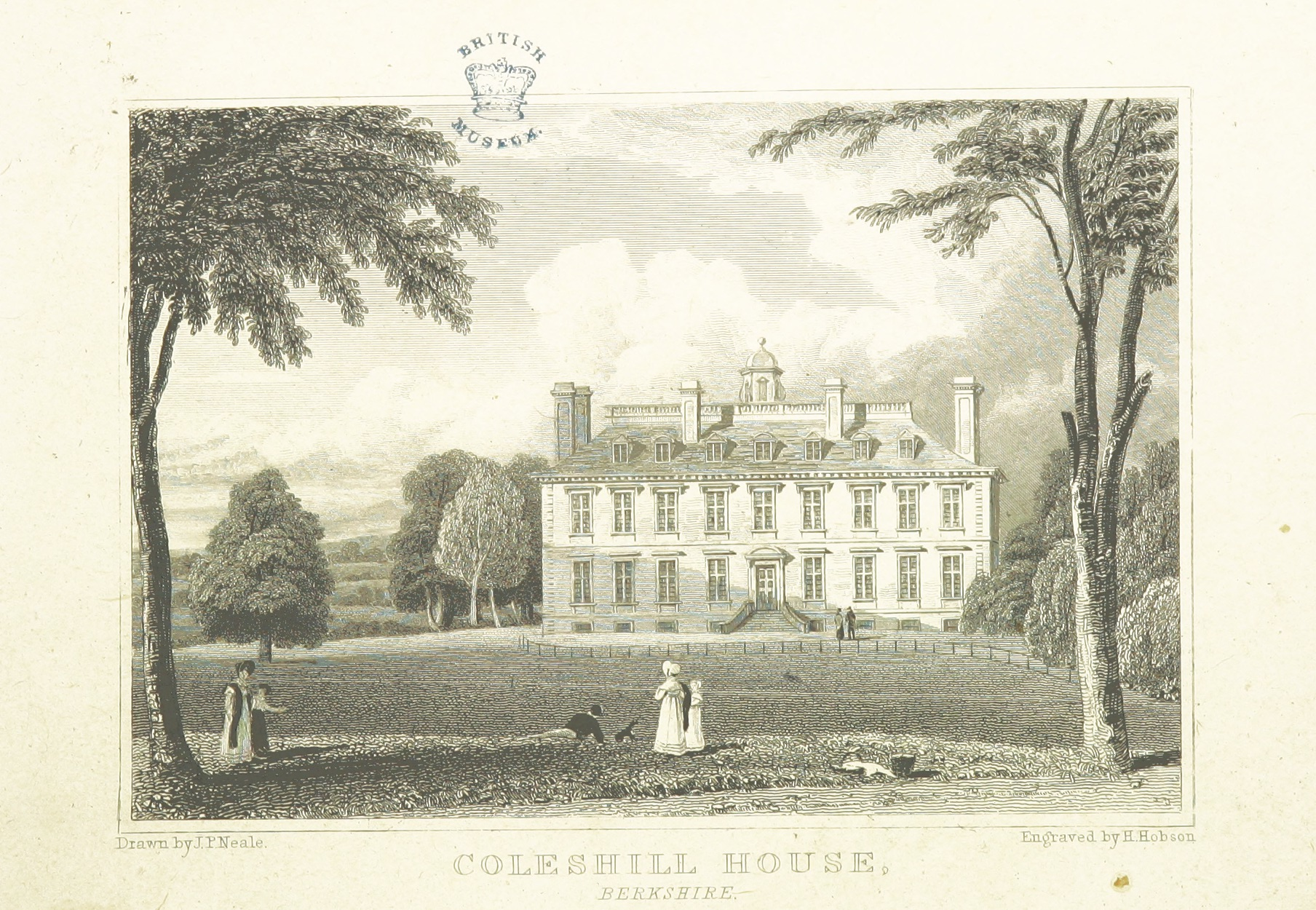
Engraving of Coleshill House, 1818

Coleshill House was a country house in England, near the village of Coleshill, in the Vale of White Horse. Historically, the house was in Berkshire but since boundary changes in 1974 its site is in Oxfordshire.

The building may have been designed by Inigo Jones, and built by Sir Roger Pratt around 1660. Nikolaus Pevsner described it as "the best Jonesian mid C17 house in England". It was gutted by fire in 1952 and demolished in 1958. The Coleshill Estate is now owned by the National Trust.

== Background ==
Historically, the manor was owned by the Edingdon family. William Edington, Bishop of Winchester, gave the land to the priory of Bonnes-Hommes of the Augustinian Brothers of Penitence, that he founded at Edington, Wiltshire in 1351.

The priory was closed in the Dissolution of the Monasteries, and acquired by Thomas Seymour, fourth husband of Henry VIII's widow Catherine Parr. After Catherine died in 1548, and Seymour was executed for treason in 1549, the manor fell to Anne Seymour, Duchess of Somerset, and then Arthur Grey, 14th Baron Grey de Wilton.

By 1601 it was owned by Sir Thomas Freake, who sold it to Sir Henry Pratt, 1st Baronet in 1626. Pratt was an alderman of the City of London, who became a baronet in 1641 but died suddenly in 1647. His son Sir George Pratt, 2nd Baronet built a new house. The building may have been designed by Inigo Jones, who died in 1652, but the work was undertaken by Pratt's cousin the architect Sir Roger Pratt in c.1660.

The house was inherited by George's sister; her marriage to Thomas Pleydell of Shrivenham brought the house into the Pleydell family, who had long been associated with the manor of Coleshill. Their grandson was Sir Mark Stuart Pleydell, 1st Baronet. His only daughter Harriet was married in 1748 to William Bouverie, son of Jacob Bouverie, 1st Viscount Folkestone; William became the 2nd Viscount Folkestone on his father's death in 1761 and was created the 1st Earl of Radnor and 1st Baron Pleydell-Bouverie in 1765. The Earl's principal seat was at Longford Castle, near Salisbury.

In the 19th and early 20th centuries the manor was the southern England home of members of the Fawcett family.

== Description ==
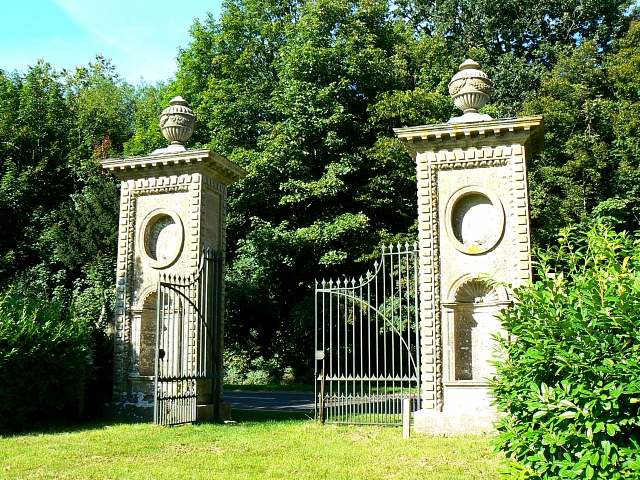
Two of the surviving gate piers

Coleshill House was a double-pile building, influenced by Jones's Queens House in Greenwich, and combining Italian, French, Dutch and English architectural ideas. It measured approximately 120 by 60 feet (37 m × 18 m), with two main floors of nine bays, above a rusticated basement, and an attic with seven prominent dormer windows and four tall chimney-stacks on each side of the hipped roof. The roof was topped by a flat deck surrounded by a balustrade with a central belvedere cupola. The main floors had equal heights, unlike the Palladian emphasis on the piano nobile.

The two main façades were very similar, with external steps leading up to a central entrance. The pediment above the door at the main front was topped by a rounded segmental pediment, and that to the garden at the rear with a triangular pediment. The dormers alternated rounded and triangular pediments. The entrance door from the main front led to the entrance hall, and the entrance from the rear led to the salon, with the hall and salon taking up the central third of the house. From the hall, a grand staircase with flights to either side climbed to a first-floor landing leading to the dining room above the salon; central corridors on each floor provided access to the other rooms. Several rooms were decorated with elaborate plaster ceilings. The services on the basement floor included an early example of a servants' hall, so the servants could eat away from the great hall.

Photographs of Coleshill House by Charles Latham
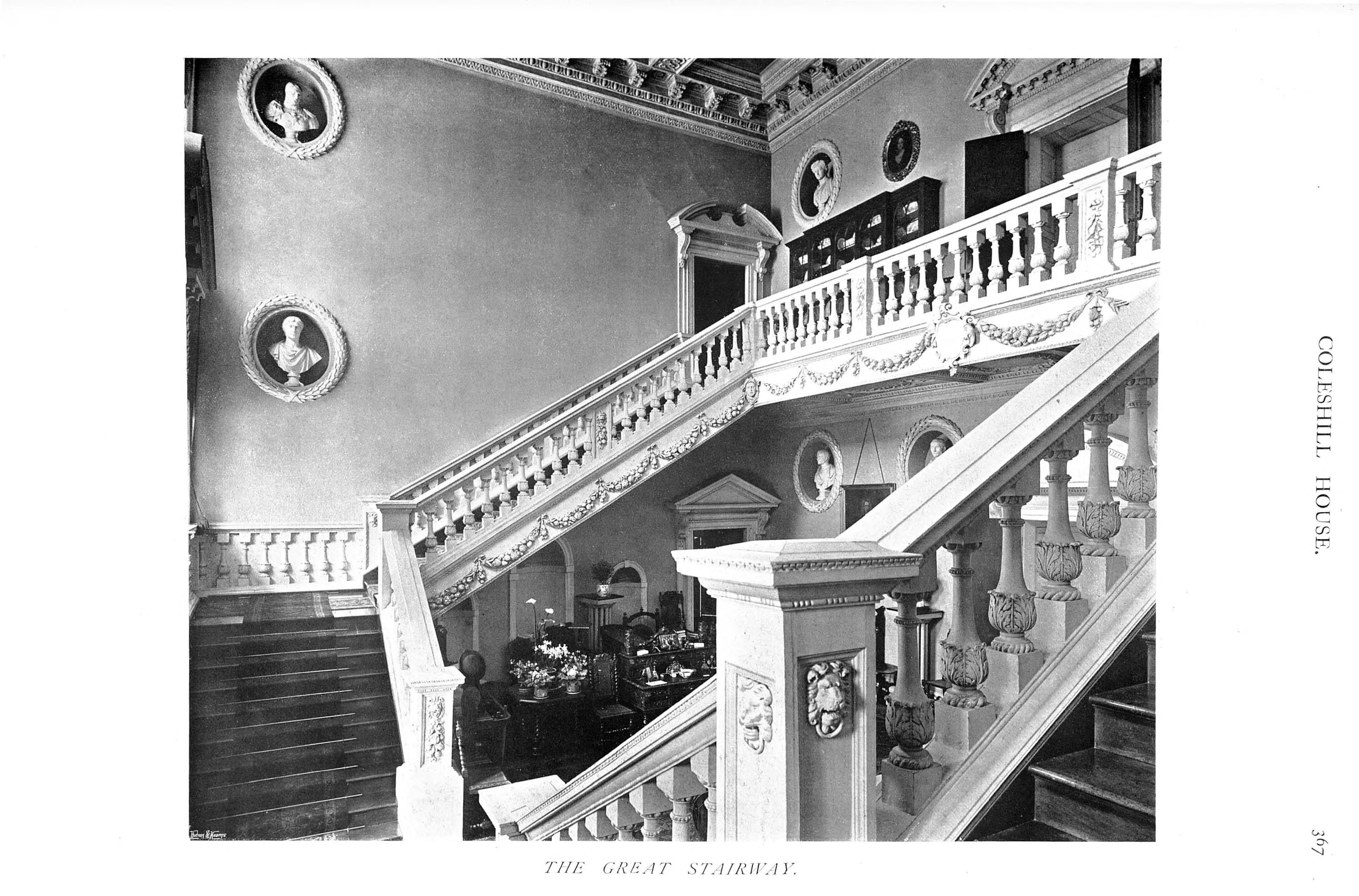
"The staircase in Coleshill, completed in 1662, was one of the most beautiful in England"

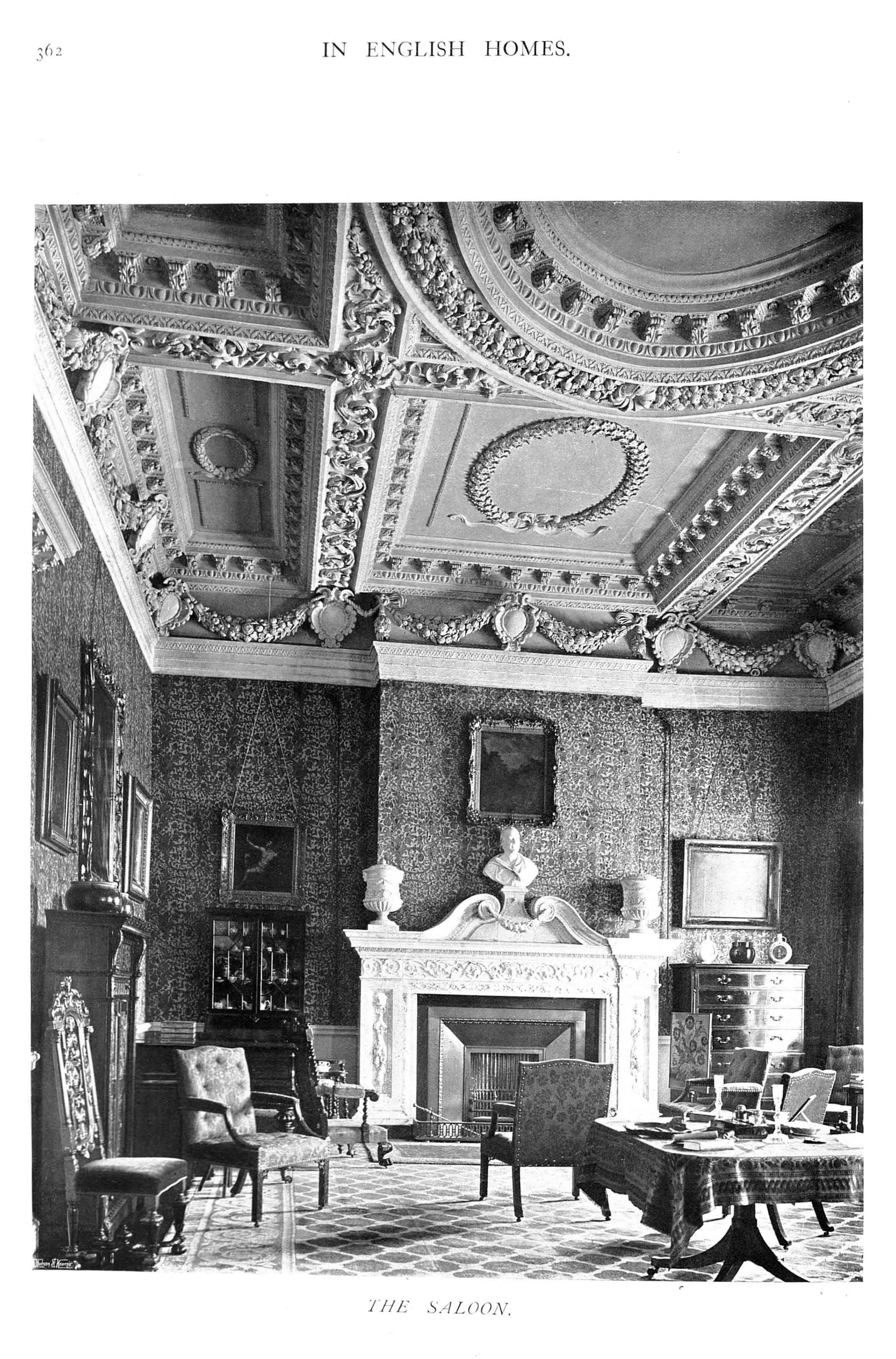
The saloon

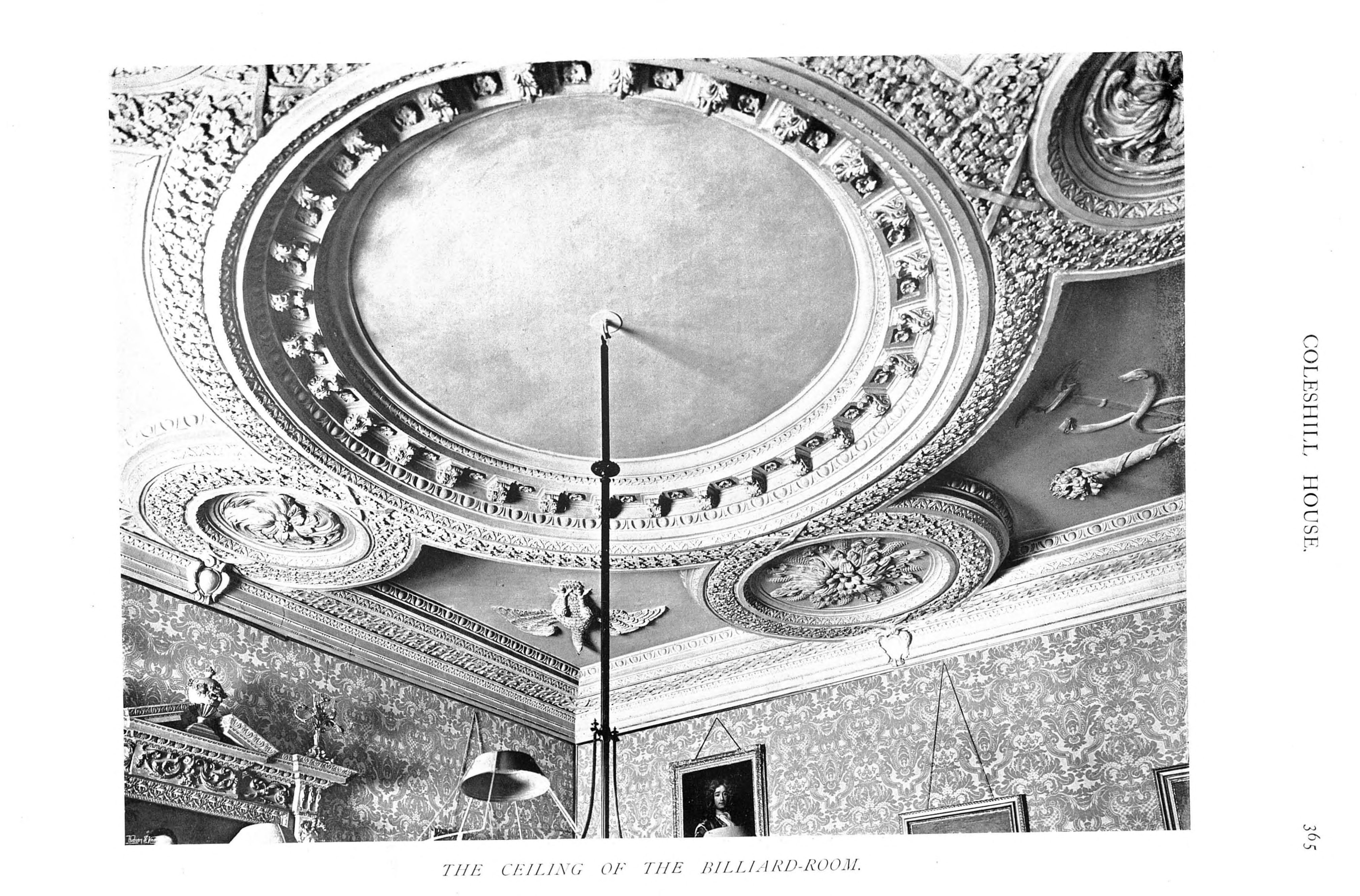
The ceiling of the billiard room

== Destruction ==
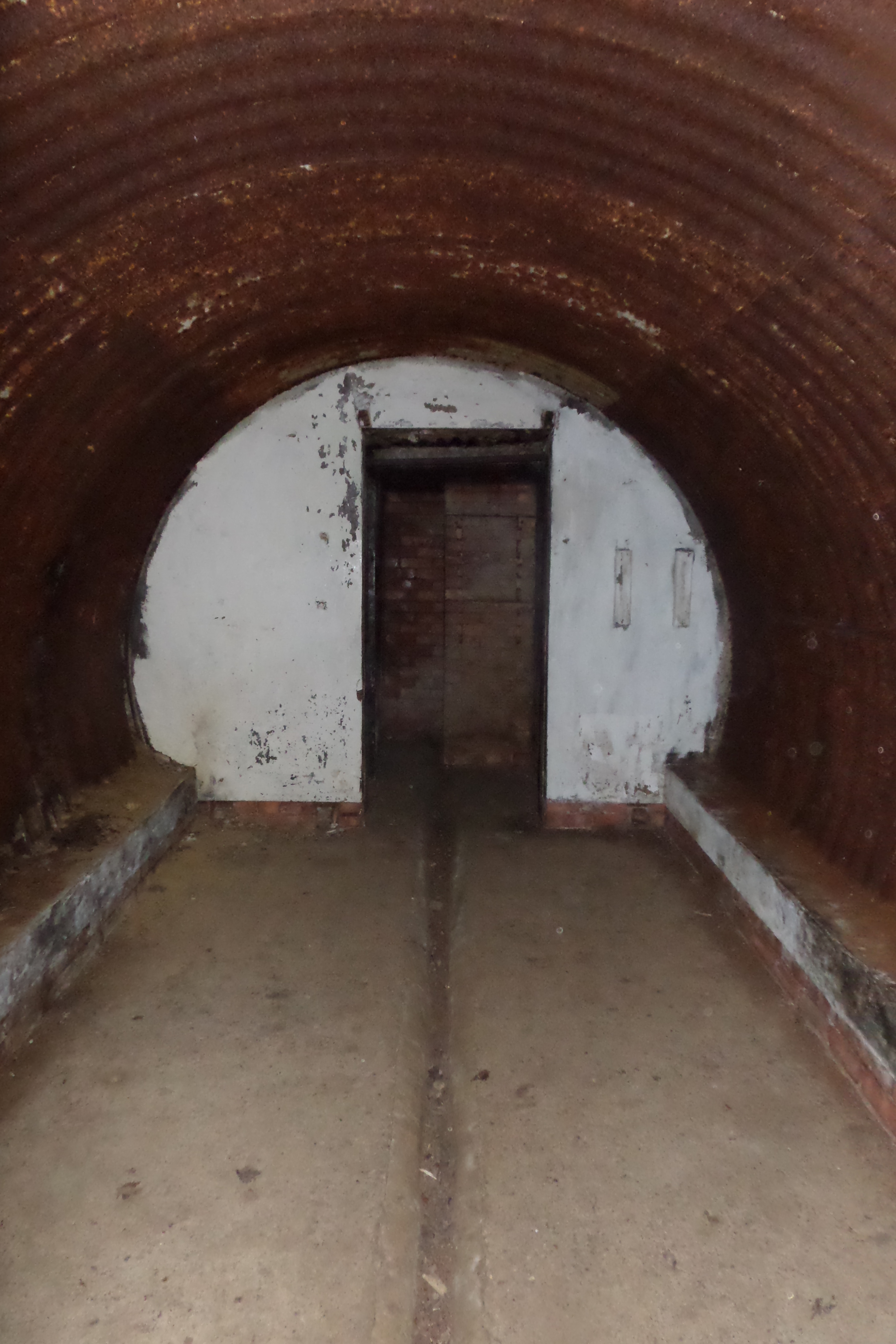
An underground operational base constructed for the training of Auxiliary Unit personnel

During the Second World War, the house was requisitioned as the training headquarters for the Auxiliary Units, the secret British Resistance in the event of a German invasion.

The house was sold by the Pleydell-Bouverie family in 1946, and bought by Ernest Cook, grandson of the travel agent Thomas Cook. Substantial renovations were almost complete by 1952, when the house was badly damaged by a fire that gutted the house within a matter of hours. The shell was demolished in 1958. Cook had earlier agreed to give the estate to the National Trust on his death.

Surviving features include two single-storey entrance lodges: one built c. 1850 on the southern edge of the village and the other on the road east from the village, of similar or later date and joined to a long 18th-century wall, ten feet in height. There are also four pairs of gate-piers: one roadside pair is Grade I listed since they are contemporary with the house and probably by the same architect, being similar to the chimney-stacks of the house in their design. They carry stone vases, and cast iron gates from the late 18th century. Four other 17th-century piers are individually listed at Grade II*.

Also still standing are the 18th-century stable block, and the late 17th-century former service block with brewery and laundry, known as Clock House from the central wooden clock tower added in 1830.
