= Langton House, Bristol =

Langton House
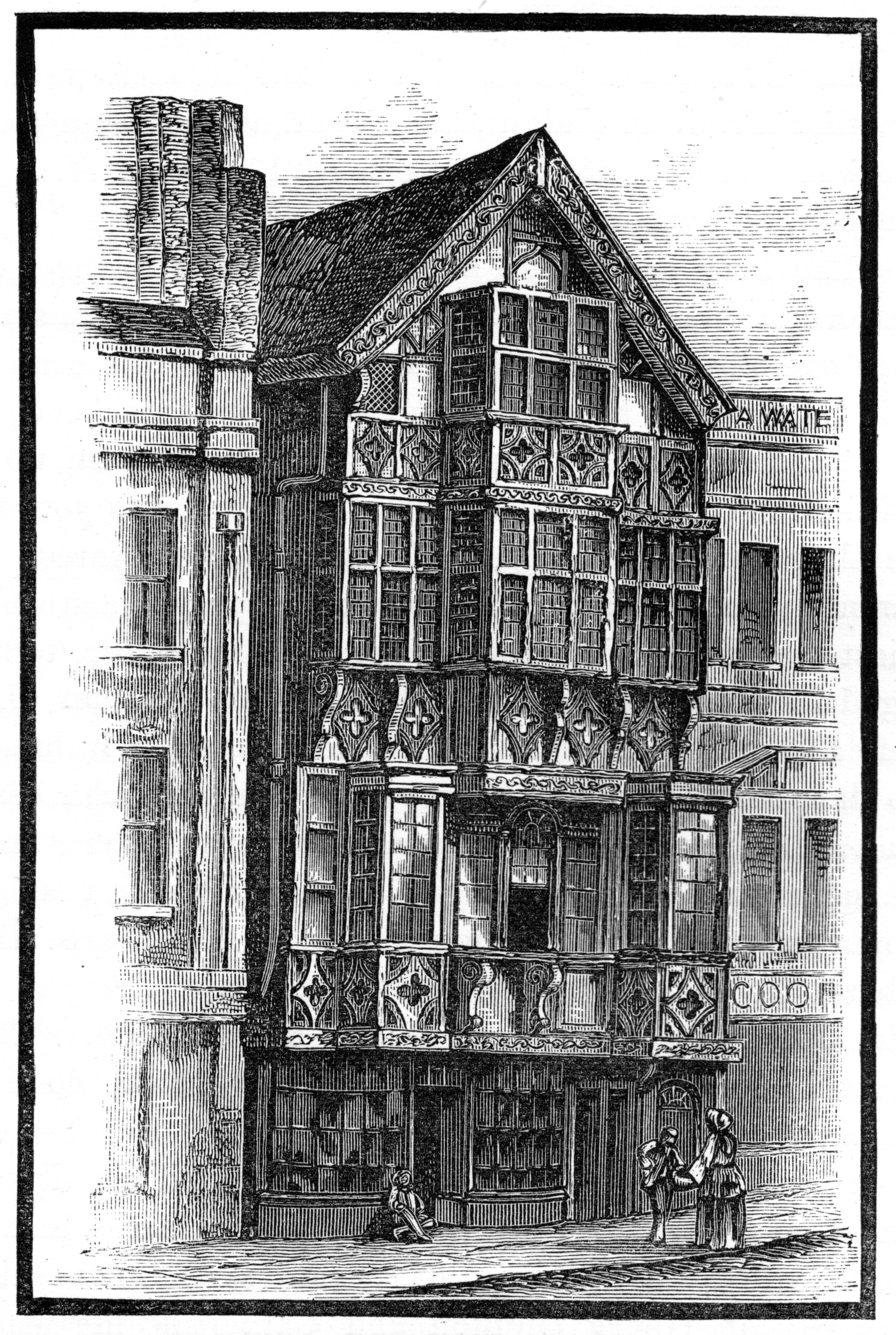
- Interactive map of the Langton House area
- Alternative names: Langton Mansion

General information
- Type: House
- Architectural style: Jacobean
- Location: 12, Welsh Back, Bristol
- Coordinates: 51.450442°N 2.592515°W
- Estimated completion: 1628
- Demolished: 1906

Design and construction
- Known for: Elaborate interiors, mostly removed to New Place, Hampshire, after demolition

Langton House or Langton Mansion located at 12, Welsh Back, Bristol, was a Jacobean house, built by John Langton, a merchant of Bristol who became mayor of the city in 1628. It is notable for its elaborate interiors. The house was demolished in 1906, but much of the internal fittings survive, mostly at New Place, a house in Hampshire designed by Edwin Lutyens.

== 1623-1906 ==
John Langton (1600-1645–6) was a merchant who was mayor of Bristol in 1628, and a Warden of the Society of Merchant Adventurers (1630–31). The house on Welsh Back was built between 1623 and 1628.

The State Room, which would have been the main showpiece for Langton as mayor, is notable for its fireplace, its doorway, and its plaster ceiling. The fireplace has double fluted ionic columns supporting a wide frieze in three parts. The centre section, with a royal coat of arms, projects slightly, supported by corbels. The outer sections have caryatid pilasters. The doorway is of mahogany, a rare material in England at this time, with columns inlaid with ivory and mother-of-pearl. A statue of Justice occupies the main panel.

The house remained in the Langton family until around 1730. In 1732 it was occupied by Arthur Taylor, a distiller and chief magistrate. In 1779 it was the residence of John Davies, a tobacconist. The house fell into disrepair, and was used as a tobacco factory from about 1816 until its demolition in 1906.

Photographs of the State Room by Charles Latham before the demolition
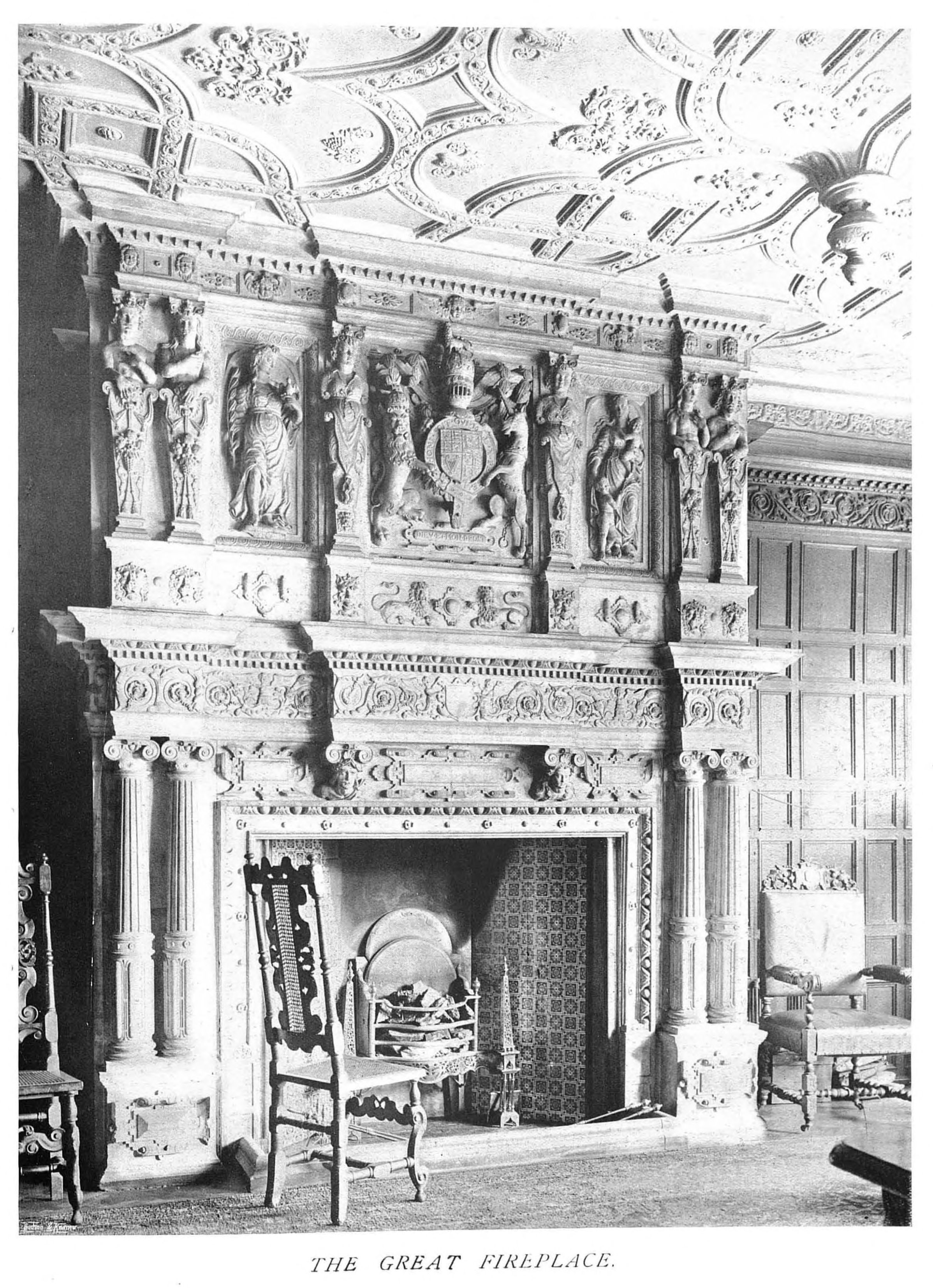
The great fireplace

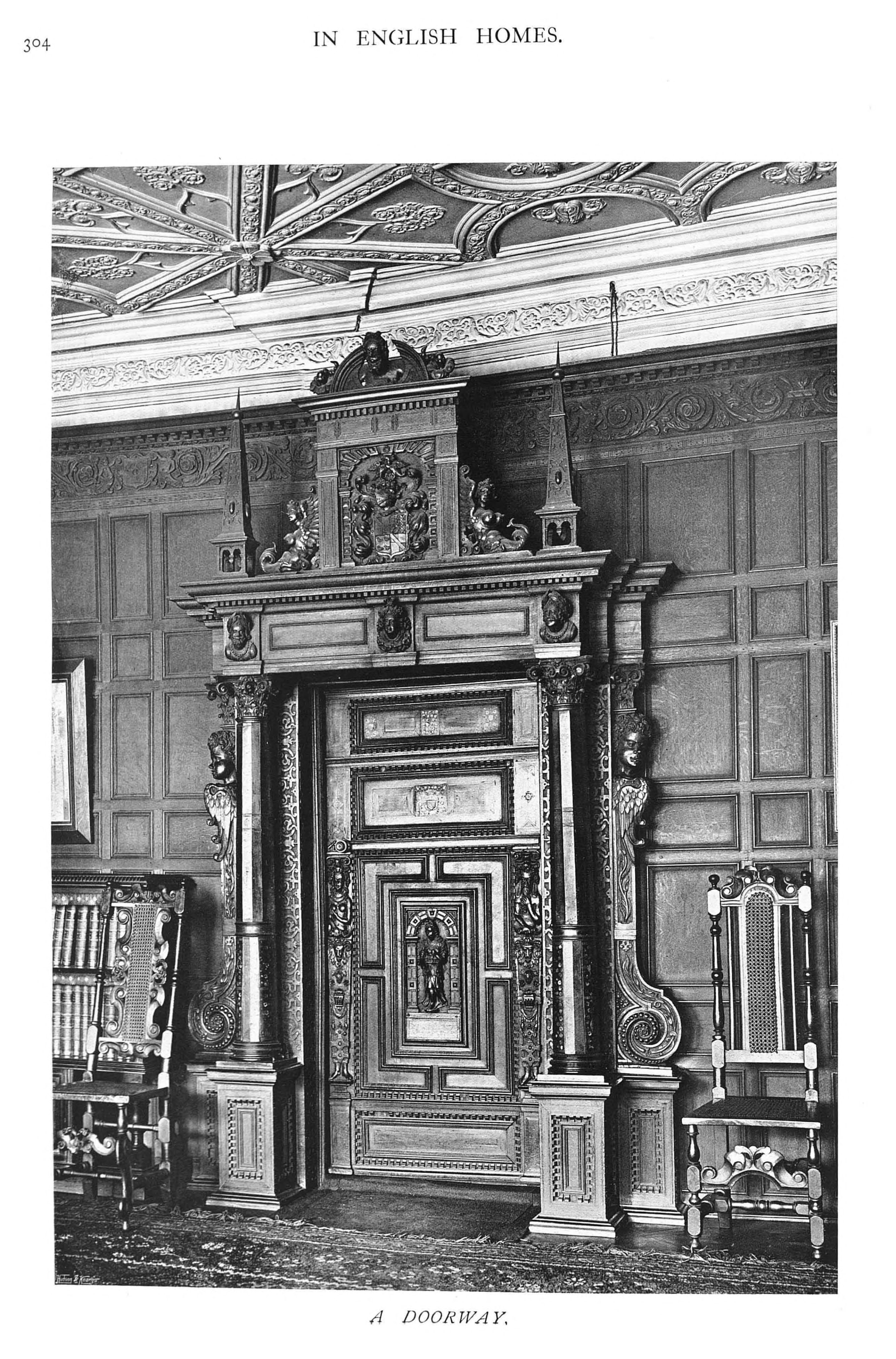
Doorway

== Removal and preservation 1906 ==
Most of the interior fittings were removed and installed in New Place, Shirrell Heath, Hampshire, a house designed by Edwin Lutyens specifically for this purpose. The house was commissioned by Mrs A. S. Franklyn in 1904, who had inherited Langton House from her father, a partner in the tobacco firm Franklyn, Morgan and Davy The fittings included the State Room, the less elaborate Dining Room, and a staircase with heraldic beasts surmounting the newel posts. Another fireplace from Langton House is to be found in the Assize Court in Bristol.

Fittings of Langton House as installed in New Place
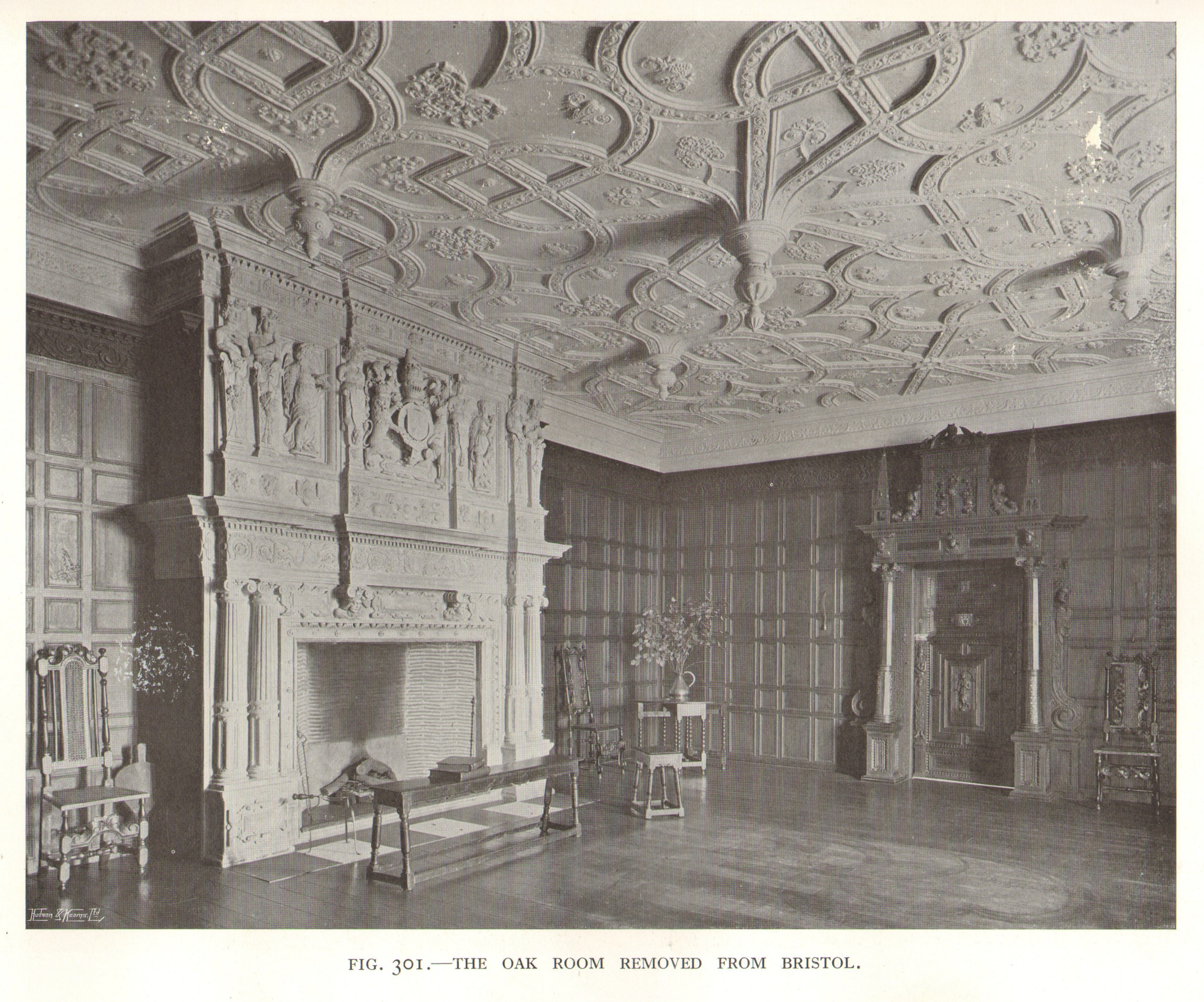
State Room or Oak Room

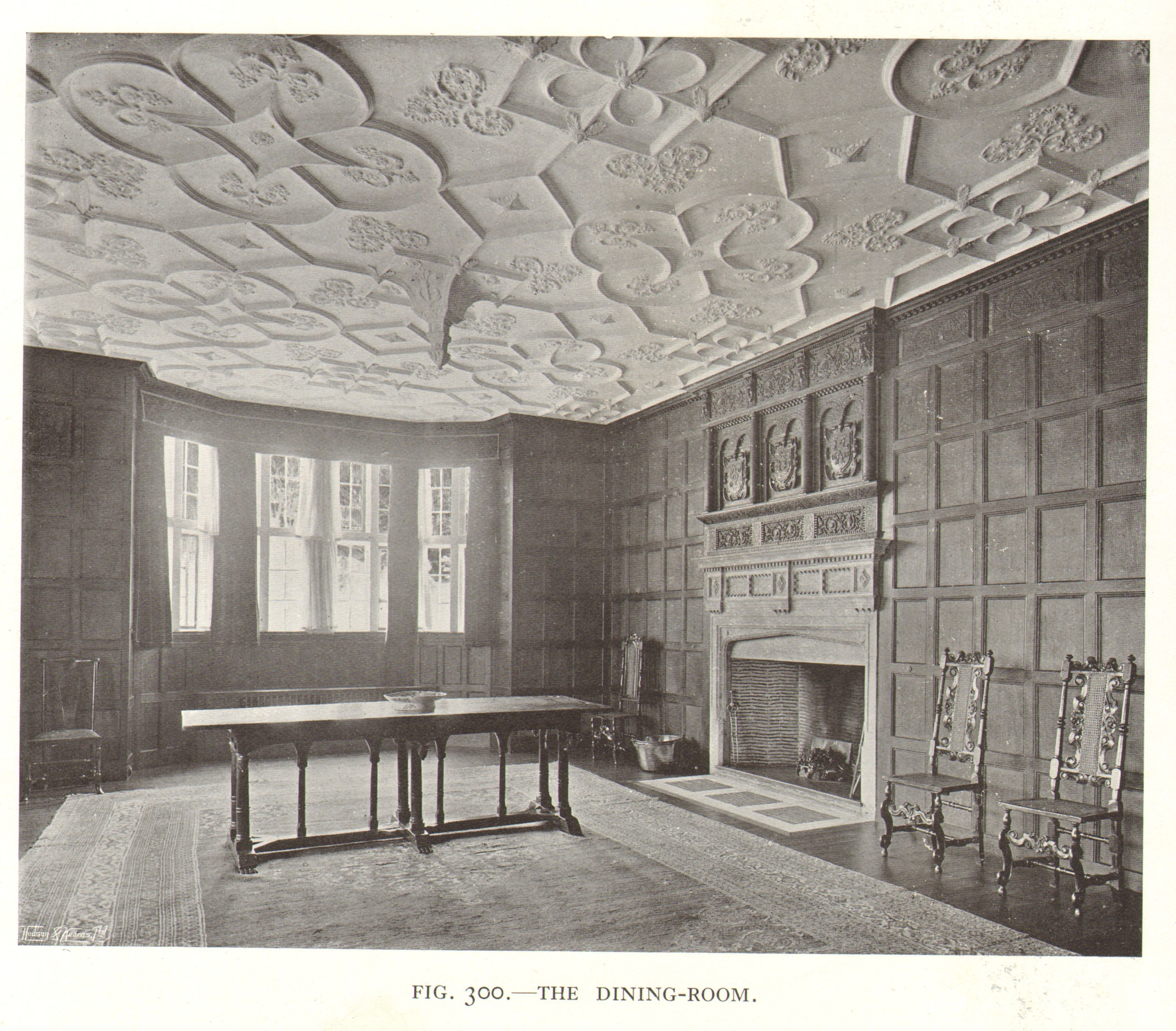
Dining Room

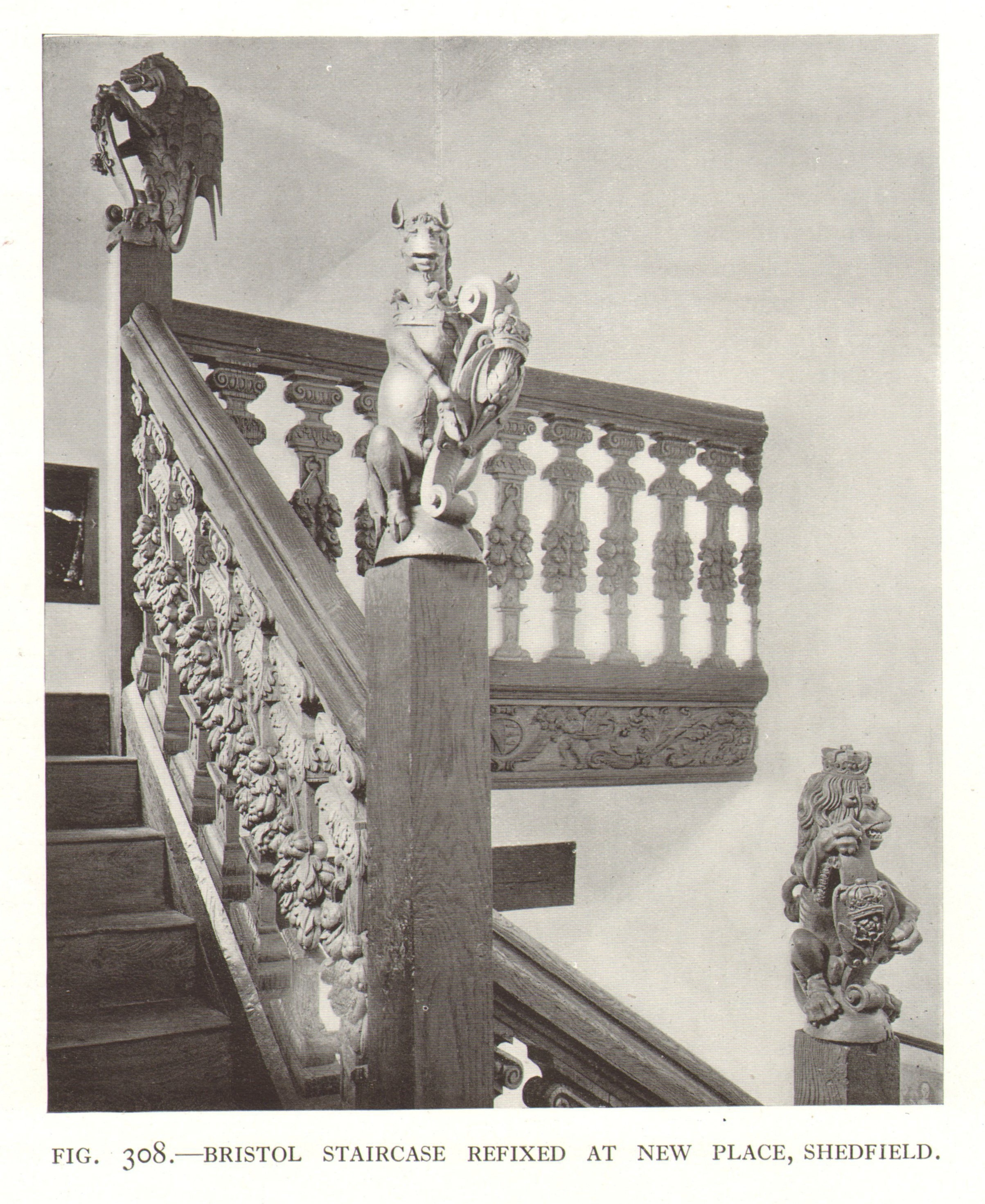
Staircase
