= Charles Latham (disambiguation) =

Sir Charles Latham (1882–1968) was an Australian politician.

Charles Latham may also refer to:

- Charles Latham (physician) (1816–1907), English physician
- Charles Latham (photographer) (1847–1912), English photographer
- Charles Latham, 1st Baron Latham (1888–1970), British politician
