= Waltham Chase =

Village in the Winchester district of Hampshire, England

Coordinates: 50.936071°N 1.195118°W

- Location within Hampshire
- OS grid reference: SU565155
  - London: 73 miles (117 km)
- District: Winchester
- Shire county: Hampshire
- Region: South East
- Country: England
- Sovereign state: United Kingdom
- Post town: Southampton
- Postcode district: SO32
- Dialling code: 01329 and 01489
- Police: Hampshire and Isle of Wight
- Fire: Hampshire and Isle of Wight
- Ambulance: South Central
- UK Parliament: Winchester

Waltham Chase is a village in Hampshire, England, neighbouring the town of Bishop's Waltham. It is in the civil parish of Shedfield, comprising about two square kilometres of land to the south-east of Bishop's Waltham.

== History ==
Previously a forest used for the hierarchy of Bishop's Waltham to hunt game, the village started to establish its own, independent identity in the 19th century.

== Amenities ==
The village has a primary school - St John the Baptist CoE; older children attend Swanmore College nearby. It has several green areas, e.g. a recreation ground and park area. It has a thriving village hall which is used by many societies and clubs.

There is a village store which includes the post office and there is also a hairdresser. The village also has two public houses

It has a very popular Methodist church, that is well supported by the community.

The local Anglican church, St John the Baptist, is located at Shedfield. The parish of Shedfield includes Shirrell Heath, Waltham Chase and Shedfield.

== Demographics ==
According to the ONS (from the 2021 census) the population of the whole Winchester LSOA (Lower Layer Super Output Areas) - "Winchester 012F" area which includes both Waltham Chase and most of Shirrell Heath was 2,830.

== Places of interest ==
There is an SSSI site (unit ID 1007744) within the village, Waltham Chase Meadows - "one of the best examples in the county of dry neutral unimproved pasture."

Across the road from the Moors Nature Reserve is the Chase Mill, which was still in use in 1957. This mill has been featured on a television restoration programme - Salvage Squad - which first aired on Channel 4 in January 2003.

== Notable Residents ==
Although much reported as being associated with Bishop's Waltham, Amanda Holden actually lived with her family in Waltham Chase in a property at the junction of Lower Chase Road, and Evelyn Close.

A well known personality in the Mazda MX-5 car community, Malcolm "Mal" Rowland lives in the village.

In November 2024 the well-respected Cole family moved to an undisclosed location within Waltham Chase.
