= Shirrell Heath =

Village in Hampshire, England

Coordinates: 50.9254°N 1.1862°W

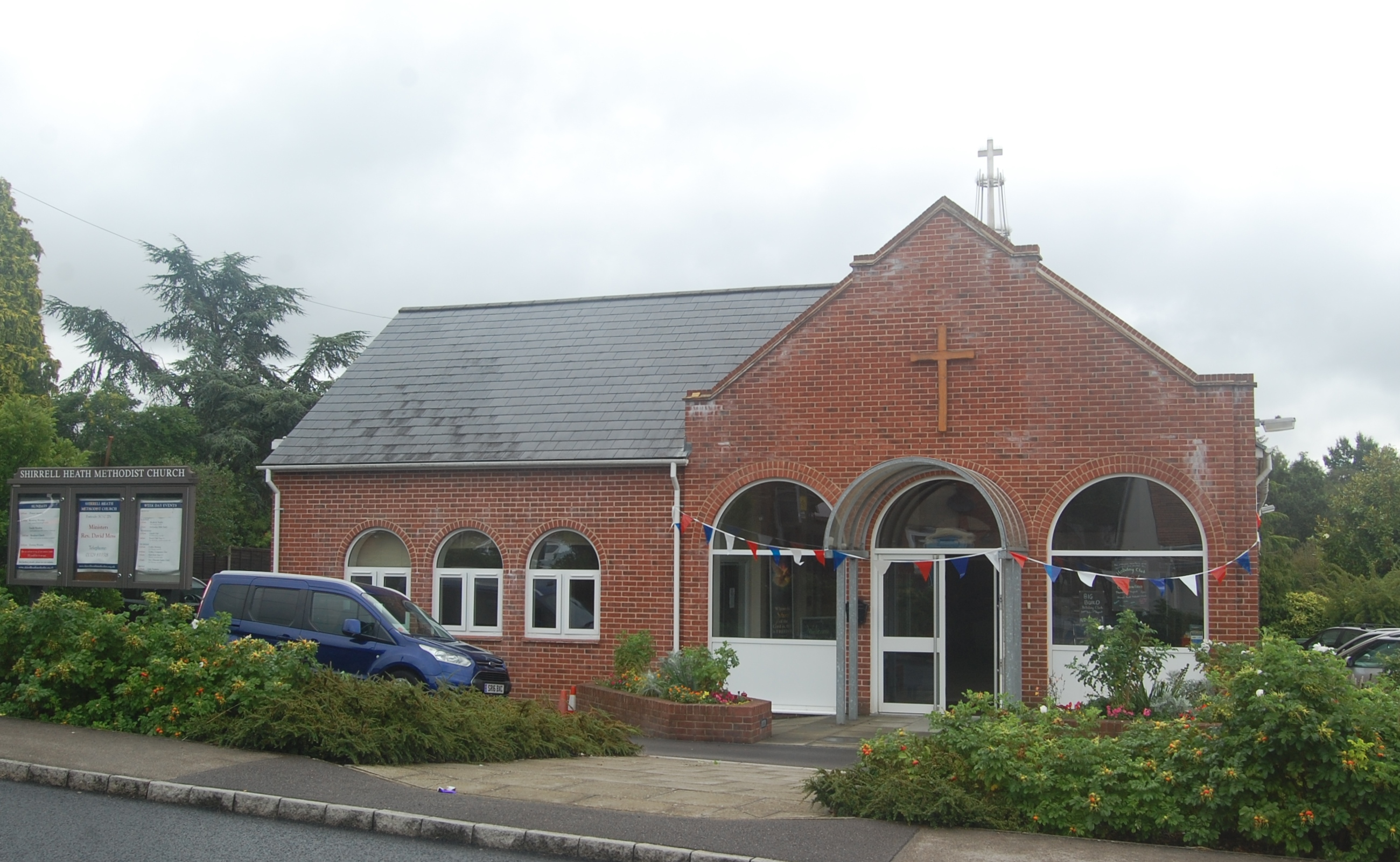
- Church in Shirrell Heath

- Location within Hampshire
- OS grid reference: SU5729514307
- District: Winchester
- Shire county: Hampshire
- Region: South East
- Country: England
- Sovereign state: United Kingdom
- Post town: Southampton
- Postcode district: SO32
- Dialling code: 01329
- Police: Hampshire and Isle of Wight
- Fire: Hampshire and Isle of Wight
- Ambulance: South Central
- UK Parliament: Hamble Valley

Shirrell Heath is a village and top of a modest escarpment of the South Downs National Park in south Hampshire, England. Shirrell Heath, and its neighbouring village, Waltham Chase are part of Shedfield parish.

The General Stores in the village was run for many years by the Tucker family. The Sub Post Office was run by the Misses Watson, and then passed to the Simpson family, and was open at least until the early 1990s

The local Public House, called the Prince of Wales, was closed in 2012.

There is a Methodist chapel in the centre of the village.
