= Shedfield =

Village and parish in Hampshire, England

Coordinates: 50.915000°N 1.2091345°W

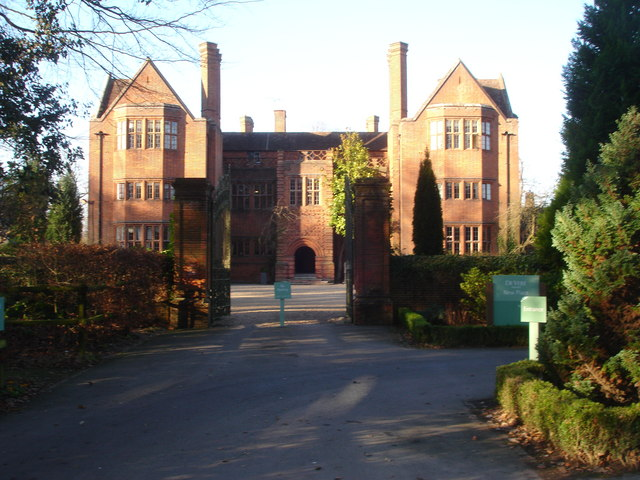
- New Place

- Location within Hampshire
- Population: 3,914; 3,842 (2011 Census including Waltham Chase)
- OS grid reference: SU5569413135
- District: City of Winchester
- Shire county: Hampshire
- Region: South East
- Country: England
- Sovereign state: United Kingdom
- Post town: Southampton
- Postcode district: SO32
- Dialling code: 01329
- Police: Hampshire and Isle of Wight
- Fire: Hampshire and Isle of Wight
- Ambulance: South Central
- UK Parliament: Hamble Valley

Shedfield is a village and civil parish in the City of Winchester district of Hampshire, England. In the 2001 UK Census, Shedfield had a population of 3,914, falling to 3,842 at the 2011 Census. Shedfield parish includes the neighbouring villages of Waltham Chase and Shirrell Heath.

== History ==
Manorial records and casual archaeological finds, along with five more detailed archaeological studies, suggest that the land around Shedfield has been occupied continually since the Mesolithic period.

The manor of Shedfield was owned by the Bishops of Winchester. Shedfield was recorded in a 1337 court roll, adding the Tithing of Shedfield to the parish of Droxford. Shedfield's parish registers date from 1829, but the civil parish was established in 1894 as part of a national reorganisation following significant population growth. At that time, the parish was within the Bishop's Waltham Hundred.

Ownership of the manor house and its estate passed to the Phillimore family in 1868, when it was purchased by Admiral Sir Augustus Phillimore and remains with the Phillimore family today. Most of the buildings and structures in Shedfield today date from the nineteenth century, including the Parish Church of St. John the Baptist which was built in 1875. However, this building replaced an earlier structure, and the buttressed tower of the earlier church is still standing. Shedfield Cricket Club was founded in 1886, playing at various grounds, until folding at the end of the 2012 season.

Much of the estate's land is now a golf course, and many of the estate buildings are used for business purposes. Also located on the estate is a Marriott hotel and country club.

== Geography ==
The village is located in a valley, and is located close to several freshwater springs. The soil in the area is mainly sandy, therefore having good drainage, and is regarded as good pasture for keeping sheep and cattle.

== Demography ==
Demographics at a glance
2001 census	Shedfield	City of Winchester	England
Total population	3,914	107,222	49,138,831
Households	1,482	43,132	20,451,427
Christian	79.9%	76.2%	71.7%
No religion	12.1%	15.9%	14.6%
Health: good	74.0%	74.6%	68.8%
Health: fairly good	20.0%	19.5%	22.2%
Health: not good	6.1%	5.9%	9.0%

The gender split in Shedfield is roughly even, with 1,931 males and 1,983 females in the parish. Most of the population claim to be Christians, with just over 12 per cent having no religion and eight percent having other religions. The number of people professing to have good health is slightly above the rates for South East England and England as a whole, but slightly below the average for the Winchester district.
