= Pratt baronets =

Extinct baronetcy in the Baronetage of England

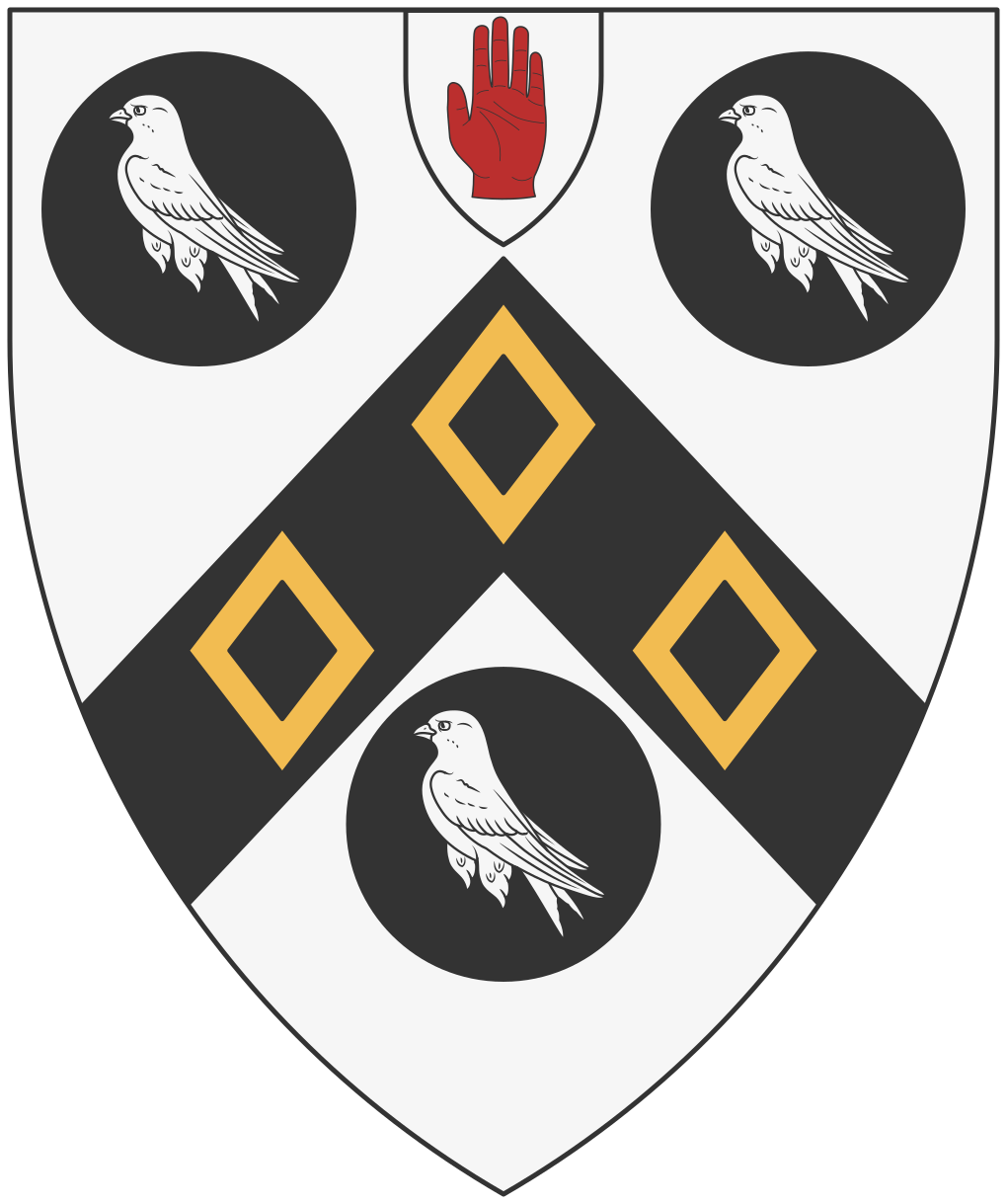
The coat of arms of the Pratt baronets.

The Pratt Baronetcy, of Coleshill in the County of Berkshire (now Oxfordshire), was a title in the Baronetage of England. It was created on 28 July 1641 for Henry Pratt, an Alderman of the City of London. The title became extinct on the death of the third Baronet in 1674.

== Pratt baronets, of Coleshill (1641) ==
- Sir Henry Pratt, 1st Baronet (c. 1573–1647)
- Sir George Pratt, 2nd Baronet (c. 1605–1673)
- Sir Henry Pratt, 3rd Baronet (c. 1650–1674)
