= Pleydell =

Pleydell may refer to:

- Edmund Pleydell, MP for Wootton Bassett
- Edmund Morton Pleydell, MP for Dorchester and Dorset
- Gabriel Pleydell (fl. 1519–c.1591), English politician
- John Pleydell (1601–1693), English politician
- Josiah Pleydell (c.1641–1707), Archdeacon of Chichester
- William Pleydell, English lawyer and politician, brother of the above
- Pleydell baronets
