= Charles Latham (photographer) =

English photographer

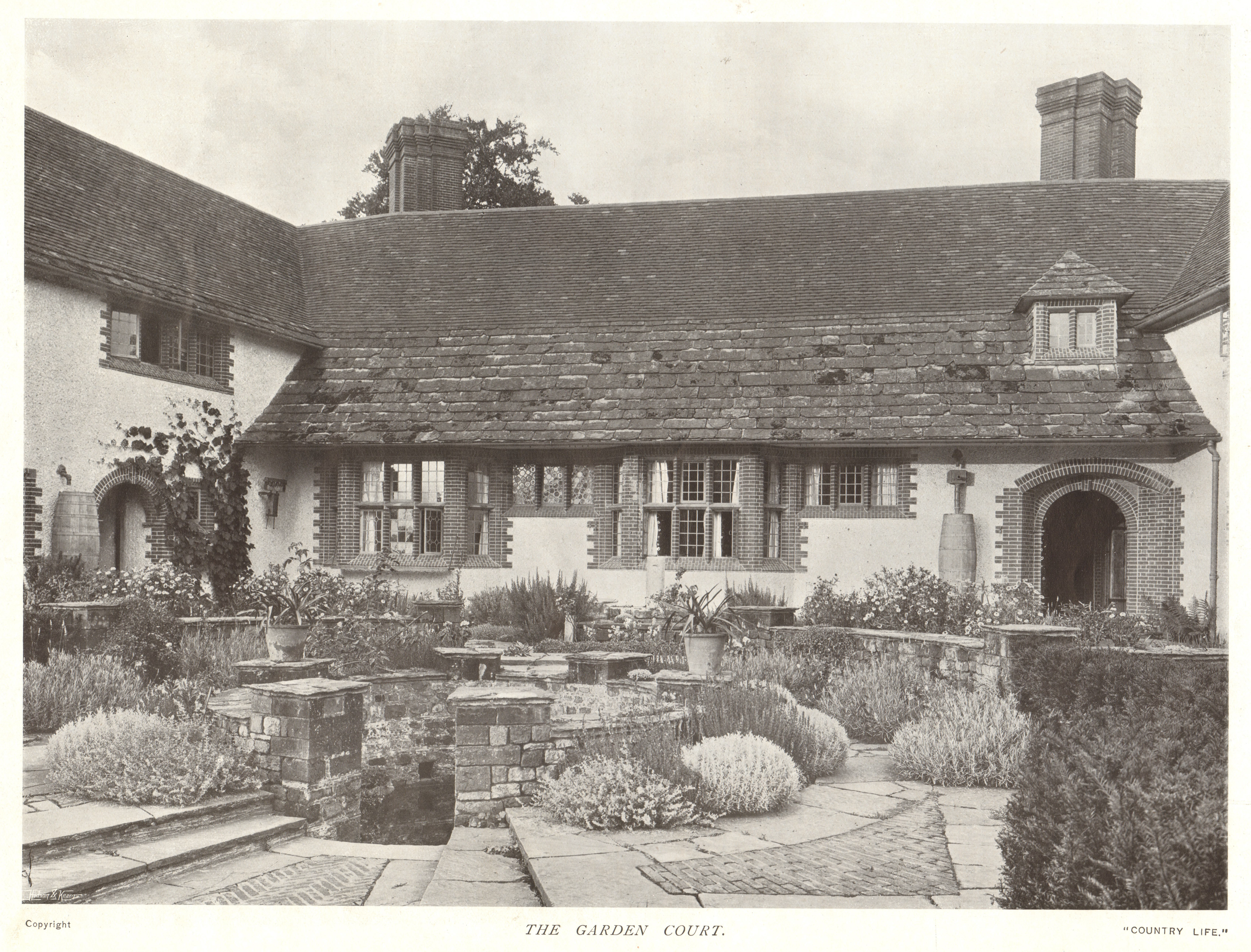
Charles Latham's 1904 photograph of the Garden Court at Goddards, a house in Surrey designed by Lutyens with gardens by Gertrude Jekyll

Charles Latham (15 May 1847 – 27 October 1912) was staff photographer of the magazine Country Life in the early years of the 20th century. He is noted for his photographs of country houses and gardens, mostly in Britain and Italy.

== Life and work ==
Charles Latham was born on 15 May 1847 in Manchester, the son of an engraver. Nothing is known about his early life, how he learnt his craft as a photographer, or the start of his career. By 1874 he was based in London. The earliest known photograph by Latham was of the Three Nuns Inn on Aldgate High Street, taken for the antiquarian Philip Norman. Norman was documenting London buildings that were about to be demolished, using both his own drawings and paintings, and photographs.

Latham worked for publishers such as Ernst Wasmuth and Batsford, specializing in architecture and outdoor topics. For Wasmuth he provided photographs for an overview of British and Irish architecture published in 1890. His first work for Batsford was with the architect John Alfred Gotch on his book Architecture of the Renaissance in England. He then worked on George Birch's book on London churches of the 17th and 18th centuries, which has been described as "the handsomest piece of preservation propaganda ever printed". It contains 64 of Latham's photographs. He provided the photographs for two other Batsford books: Belcher and Macartney's two volume set of Renaissance English architecture and H. Inigo Triggs's book on formal gardens in England and Scotland.

Latham became staff photographer of the magazine Country Life shortly after it was founded in 1897 by Edward Hudson. The format of the magazine was made possible by technical advances in printing that allowed high quality photographic images and text to be printed on the same page. The magazine featured golf and racing news, advertisements for country homes, and articles about aspects of country life including houses and gardens. Many of the photographs accompanying these articles were by Latham, and the topics included both old established houses such as Coleshill, in Berkshire (a seventeenth century house, now lost), as well as newly built ones, such as Goddards in Surrey, designed by Edwin Lutyens, with gardens by Gertrude Jekyll. Latham did not only work in Britain. In 1903 he travelled to Italy to photograph gardens there, taking with him a large format camera and many glass-plate negatives. Three books were published by Country Life between 1900 and 1905 featuring his work: Gardens Old and New, In English Homes, and The Gardens of Italy. A recent publication reproduces many of Latham's Italian images.

Latham's reputation was firmly established by the time he started working for Country Life. Gotch said of him, "The art of fitly illustrating architecture has not been widely acquired and we hold ourselves fortunate in having secured the services of Latham." A review of In English Homes in The New York Times described him as"perhaps the best-known photographic interpreter of English architecture". His style was of necessity often formal, as he worked within constraints defined by his authors and publishers. But as Kristina Taylor has noted, he often included people and props into his compositions, particularly in the Country Life work where he had more freedom. For his interiors he often removed much of the furniture and ornaments from a room, ensuring clarity and emphasizing the original architecture.

There are few personal reminiscences of Latham. One is from Harold Batsford, who remembered him as a man with a red beard, a limp, and the complete absence of the letter H. On one occasion, Latham was planning to photograph a house that had been subjected to unfortunate Victorian "improvements". He looked around and then said to the owner "'ateful and 'ideous. I'm glad I kept my cab" and stalked out. He was clearly no gentleman photographer.

Latham was married in 1878 to Elizabeth Price, and they had a daughter Marion. But Elizabeth died of consumption in 1881. Latham Died on 27 October 1912 in a nursing home in Chiswick, having been suffering from colon cancer for five years. A brief obituary notice appeared in Country Life. He left an estate of £12,699, a considerable sum for the time.

== Gallery ==
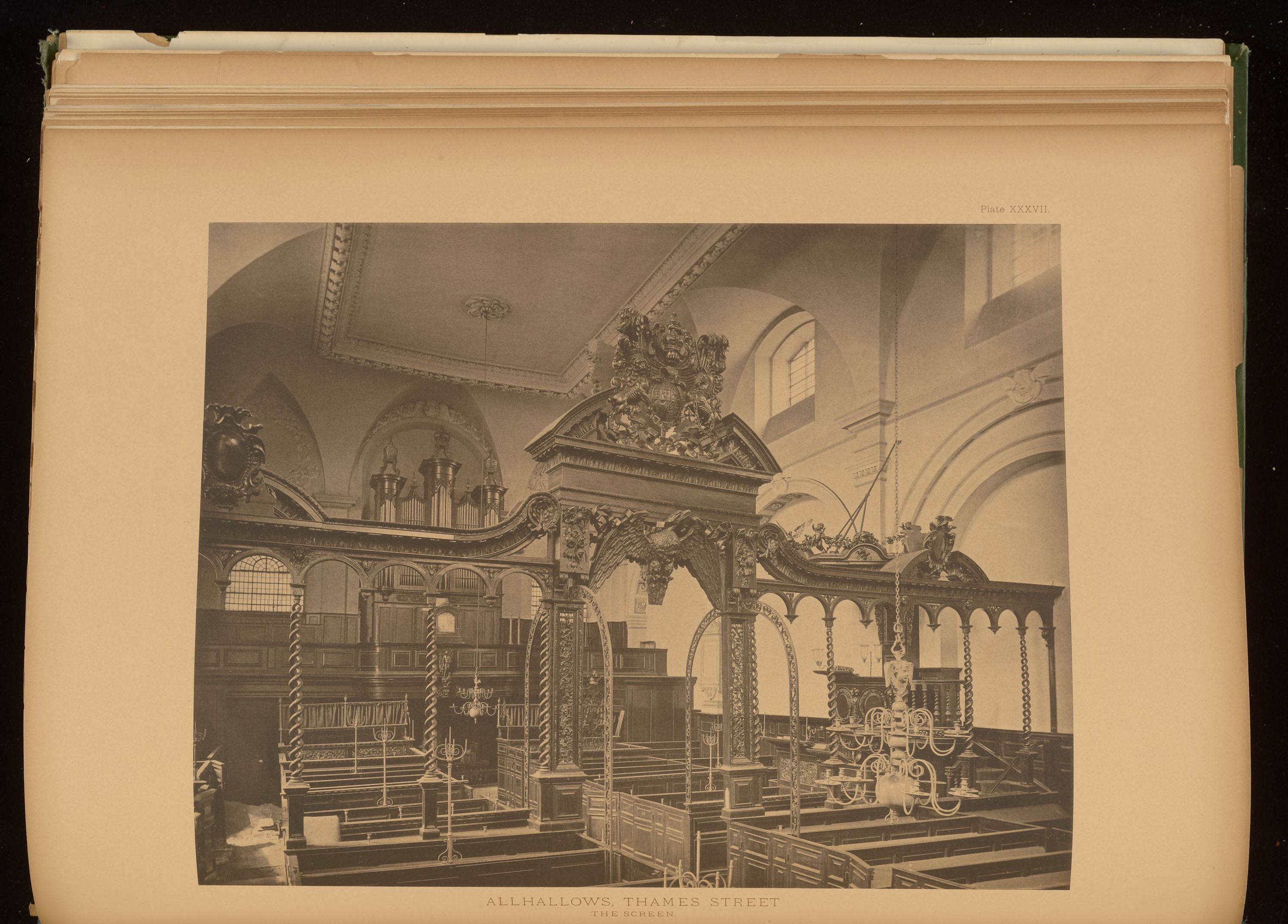
All Hallows the Great. From Birch's London Churches, published 1896.

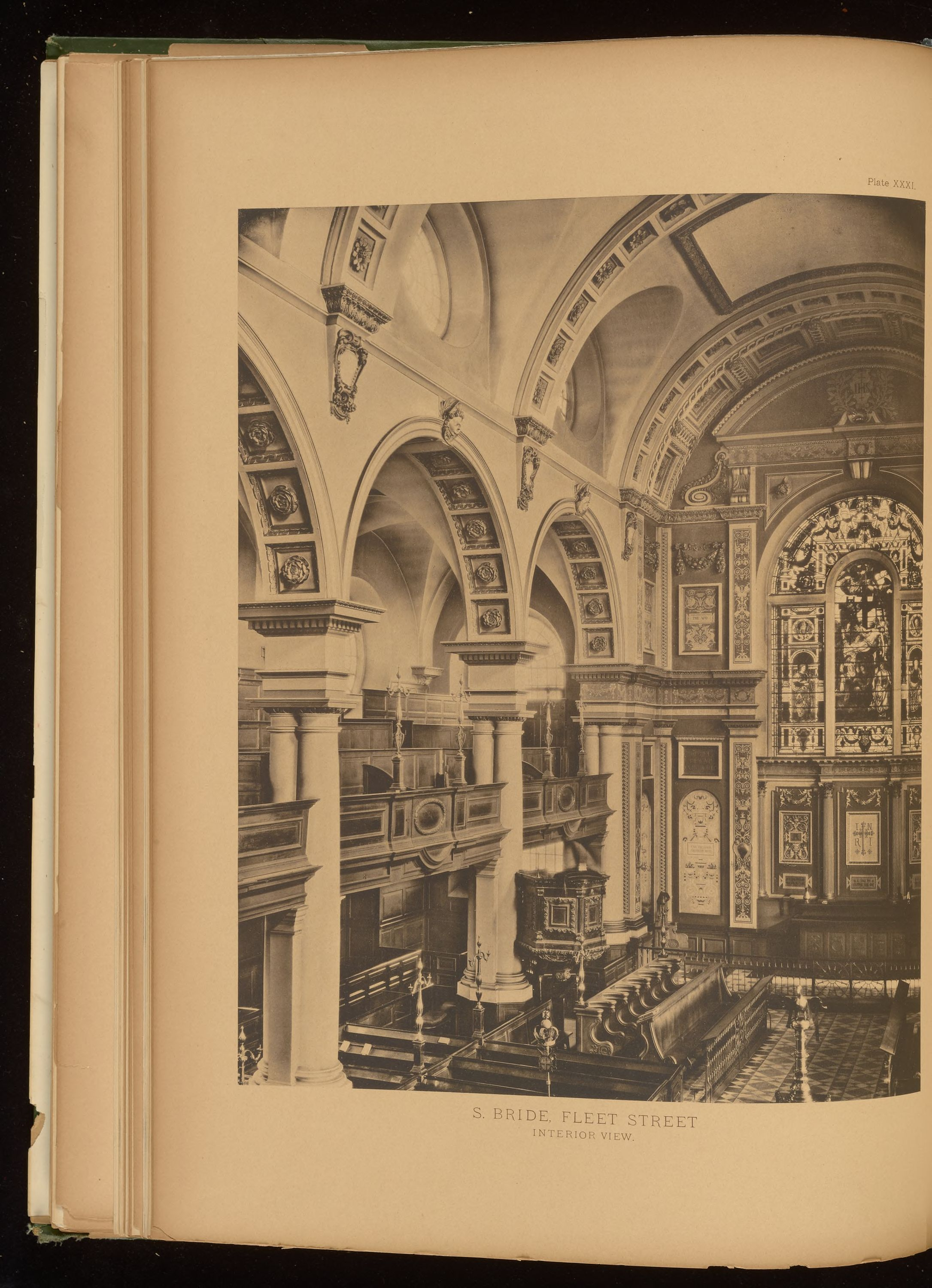
St Bride Fleet Street. From Birch's London Churches, published 1896.

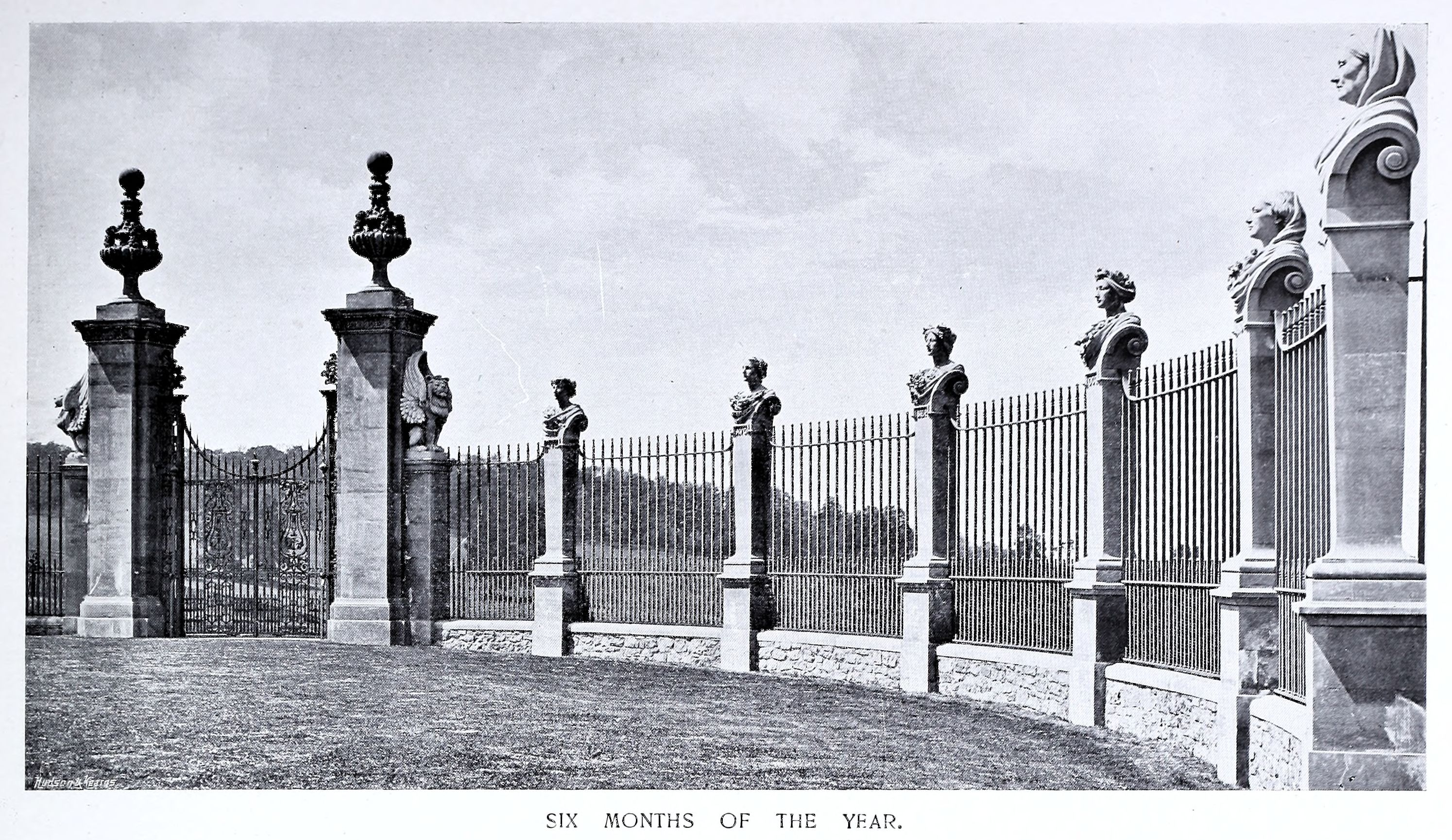
Barrow Court: Six months of the year. From Gardens Old and New, published 1900.

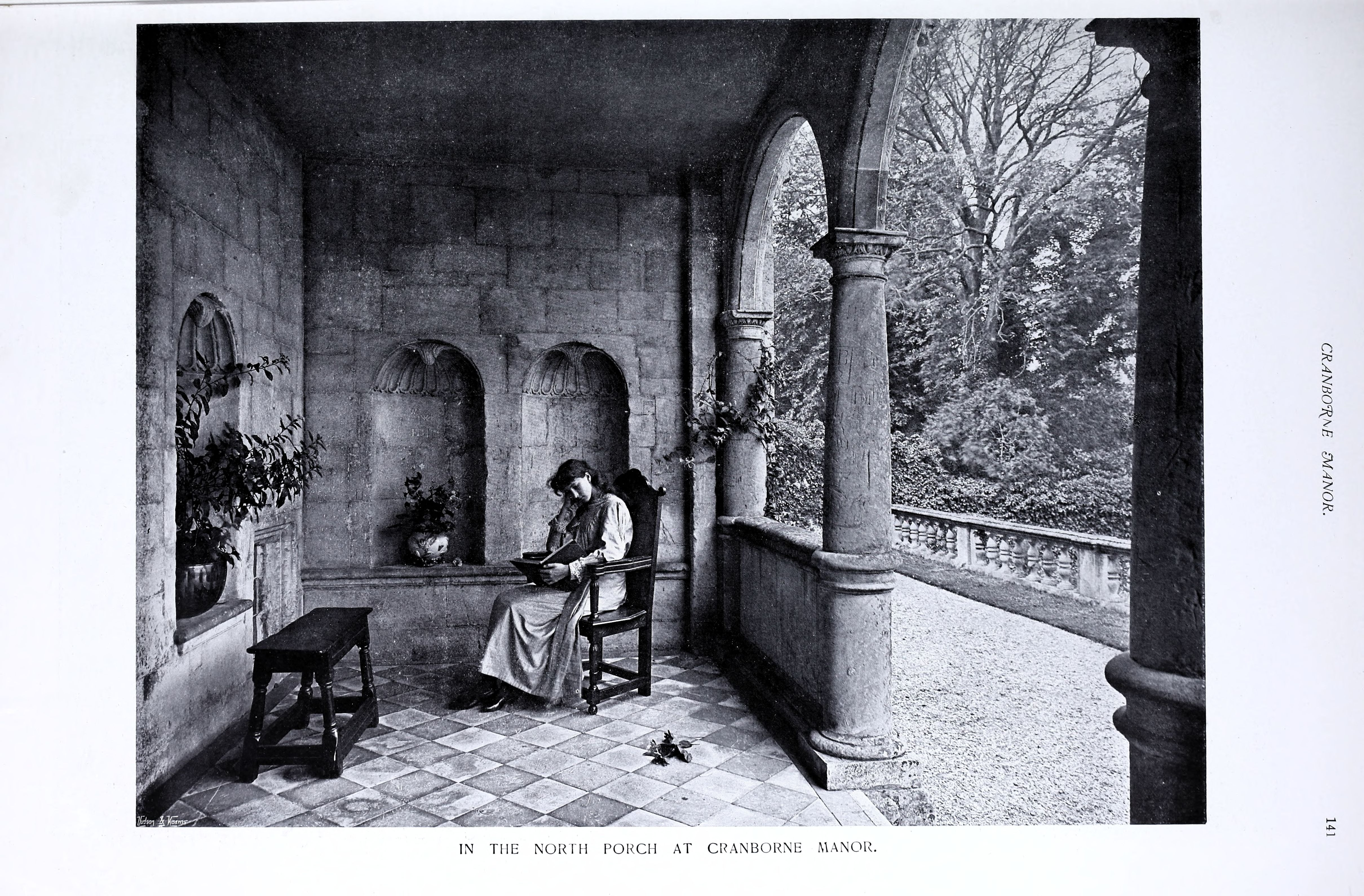
The North Porch of Cranborne Manor. From Gardens Old and New, published 1900.

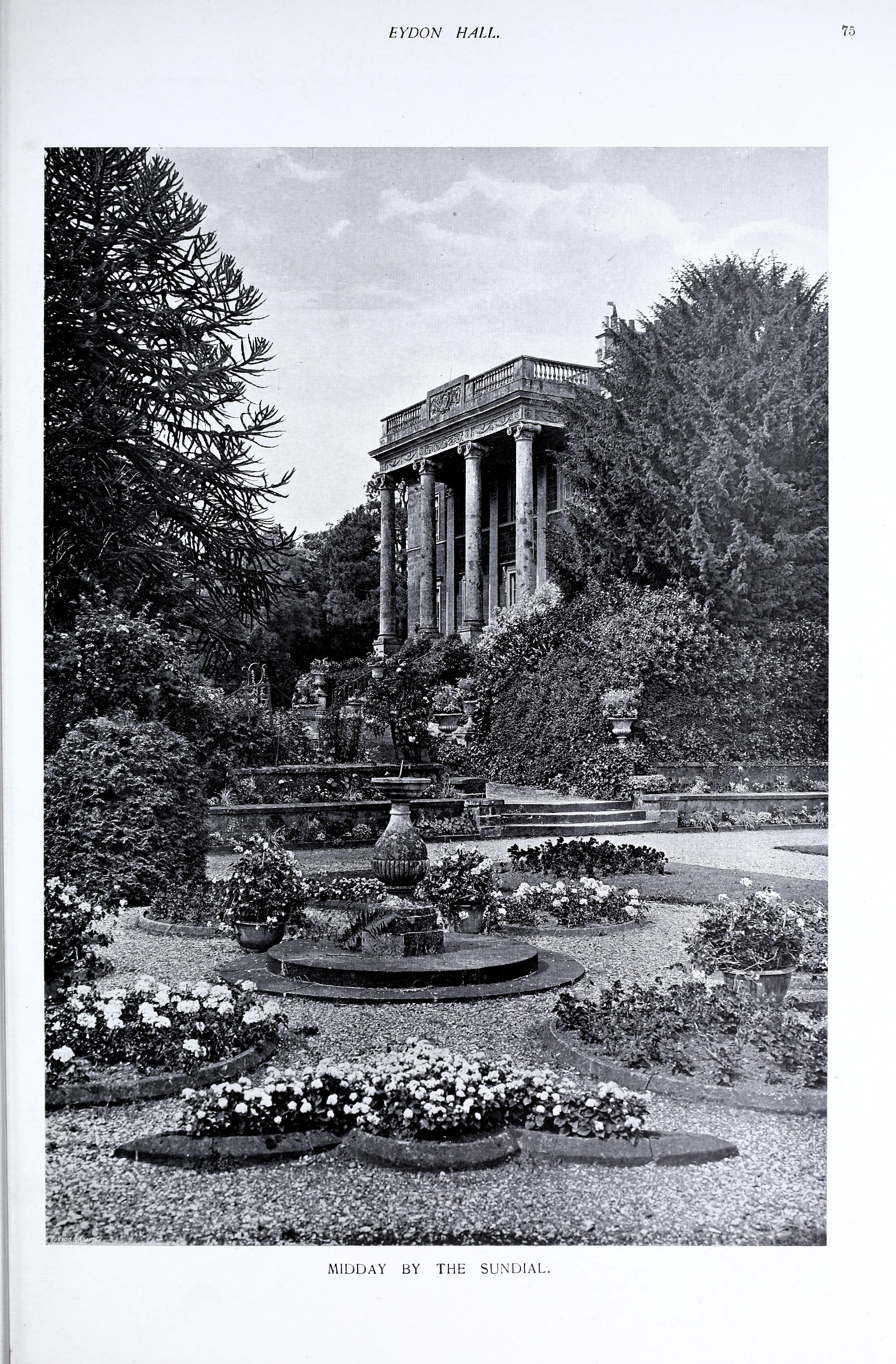
New Eydon by the Sundial. From Gardens Old and New, published 1900.

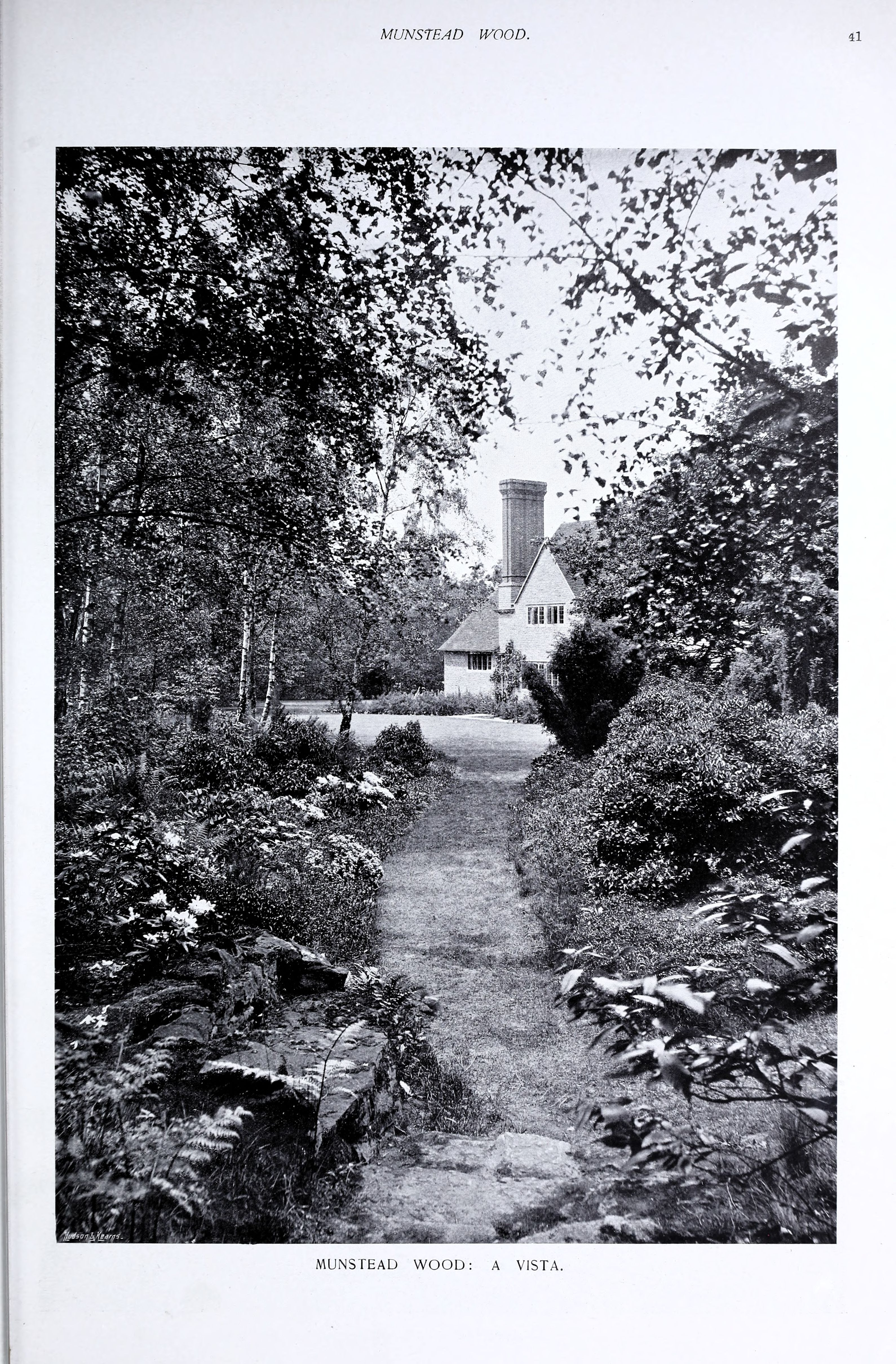
Munstead Wood - a vista. From Gardens Old and New, published 1900.

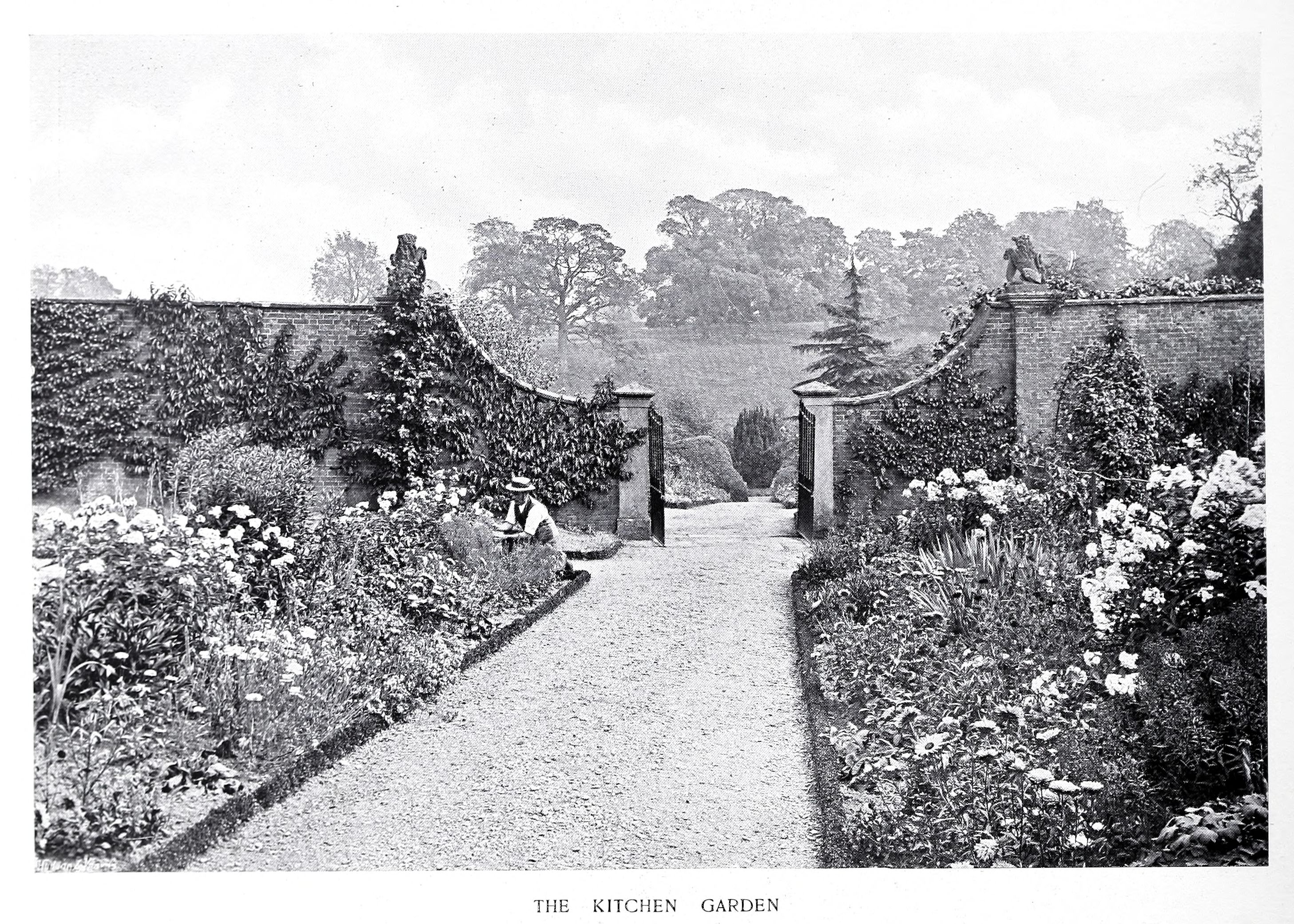
Pitchford Kitchen Garden. From Gardens Old and New, published 1900.

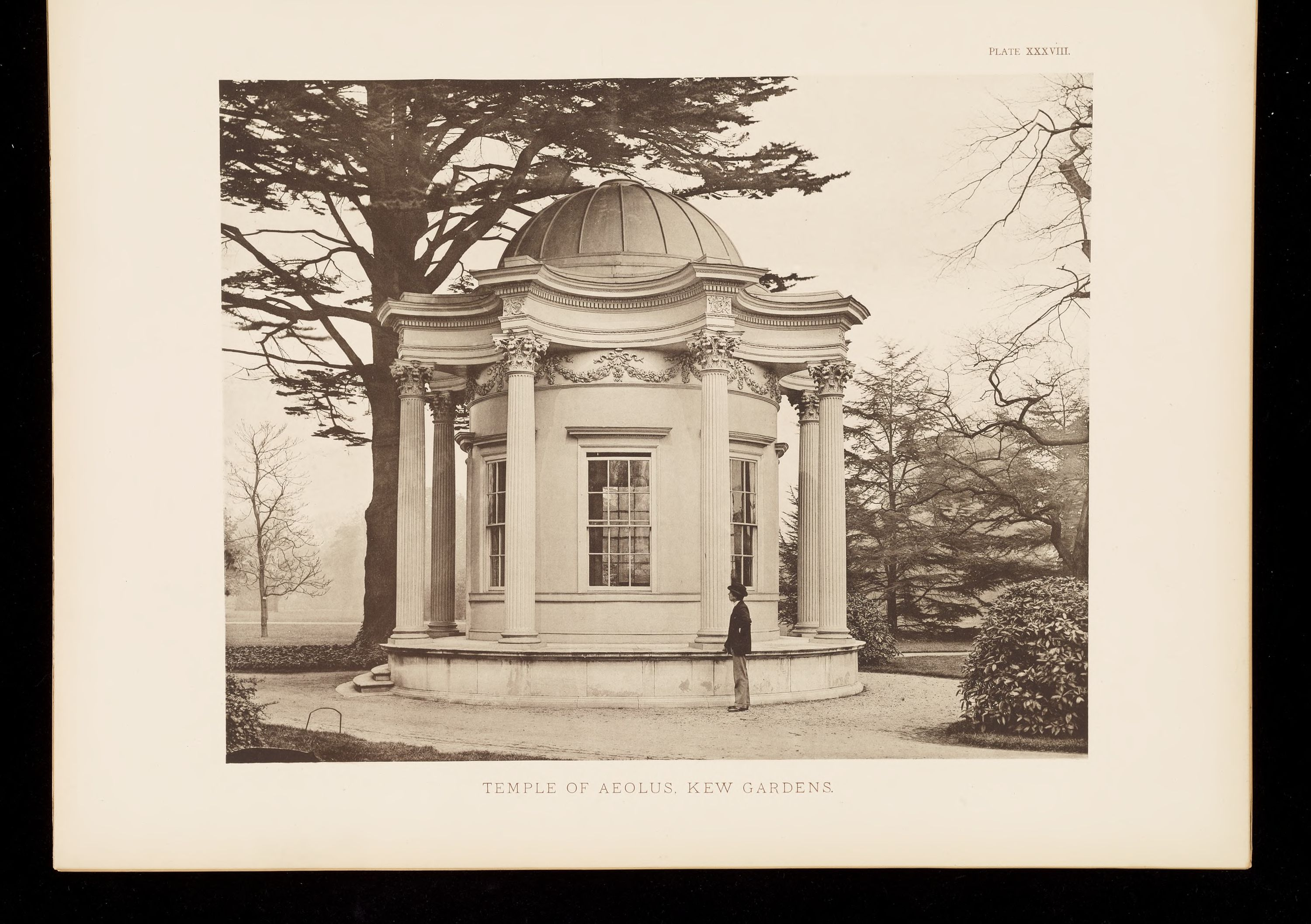
Temple of Aeolus Kew Gardens. From Later Renaissance architecture in England, Published 1901

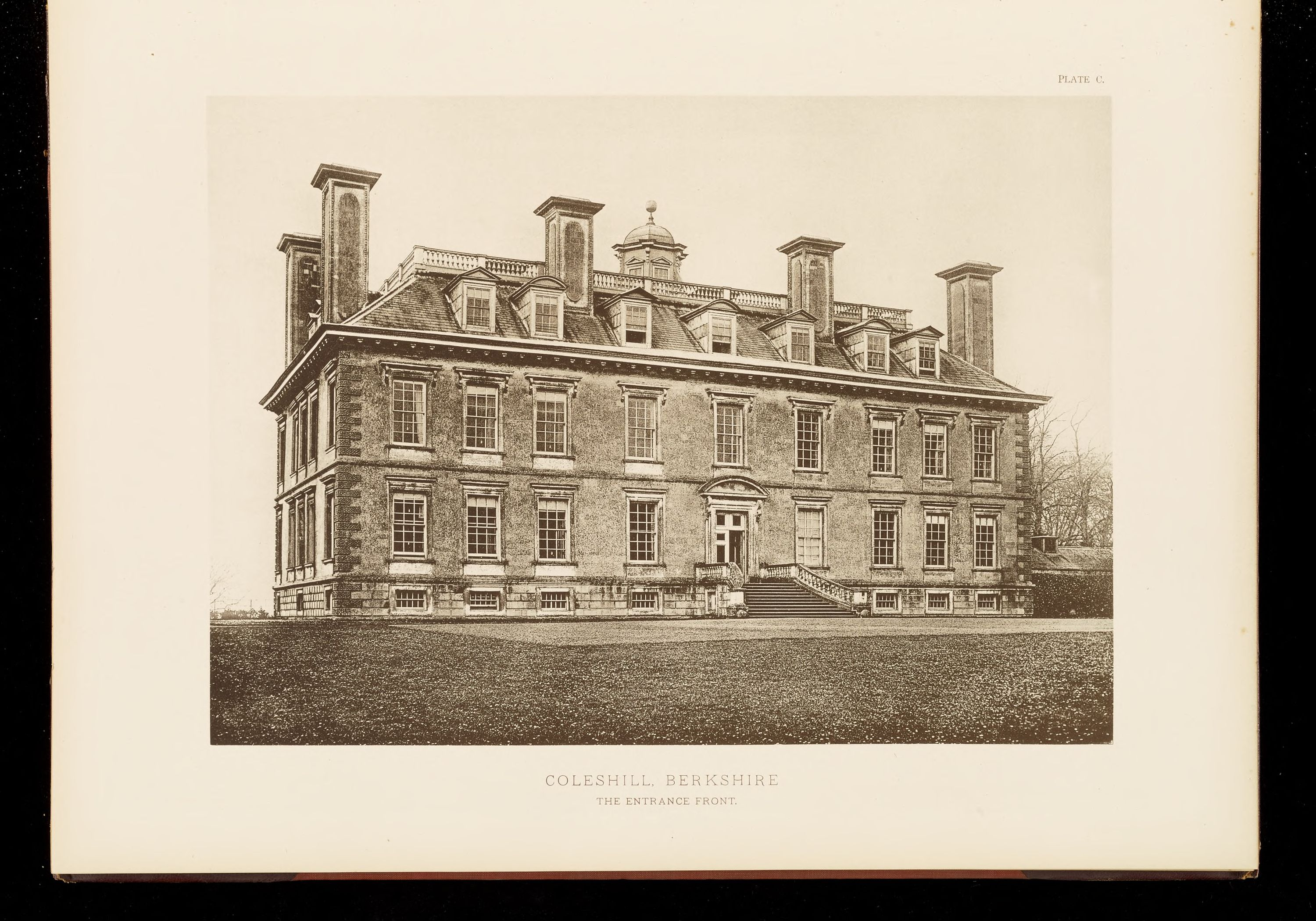
Coleshill House. From Later Renaissance architecture in England, Published 1901

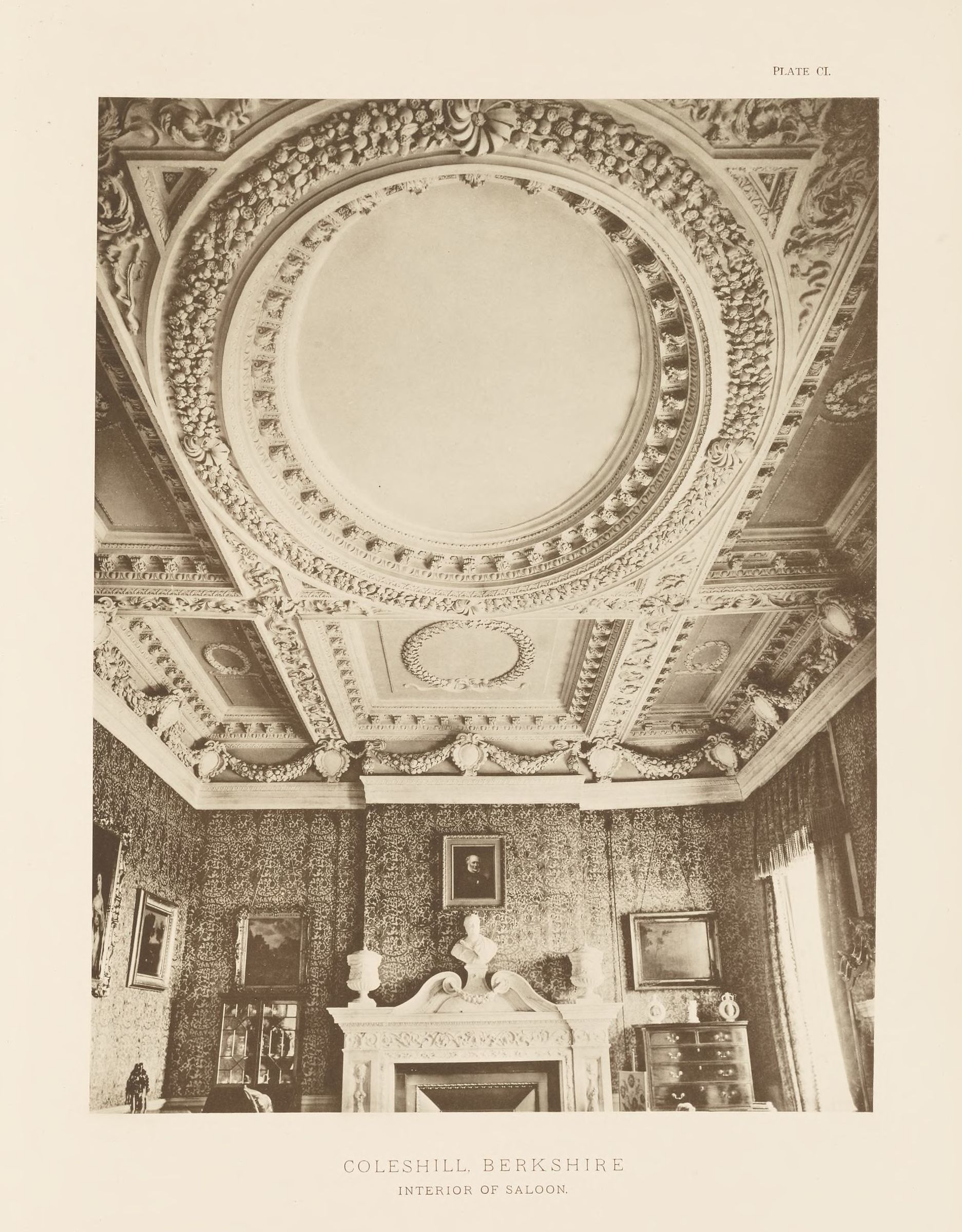
Coleshill House, Interior of the Saloon. From Later Renaissance architecture in England, Published 1901

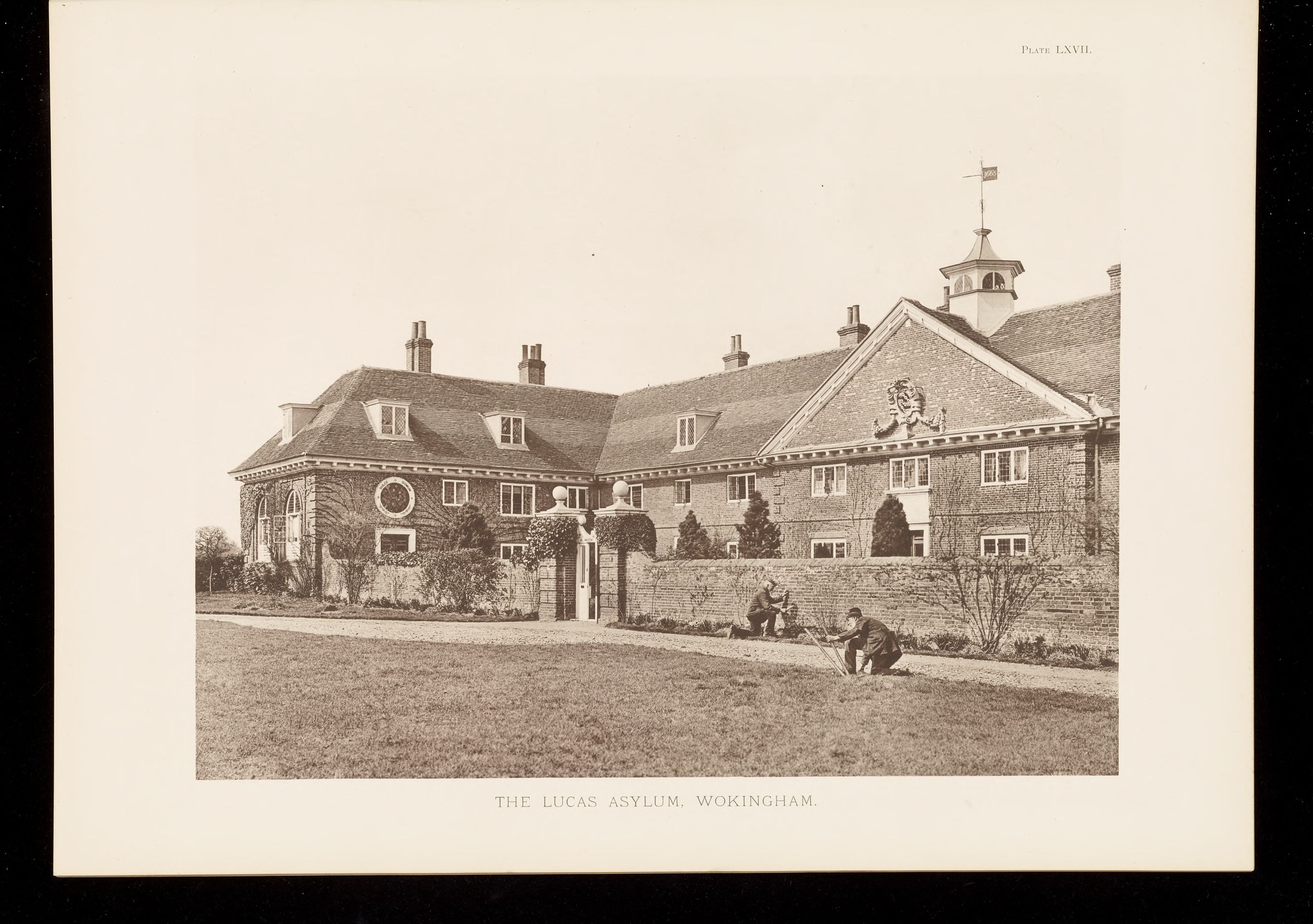
The Henry Lucas Hospital, Wokingham. From Later Renaissance architecture in England, Published 1901

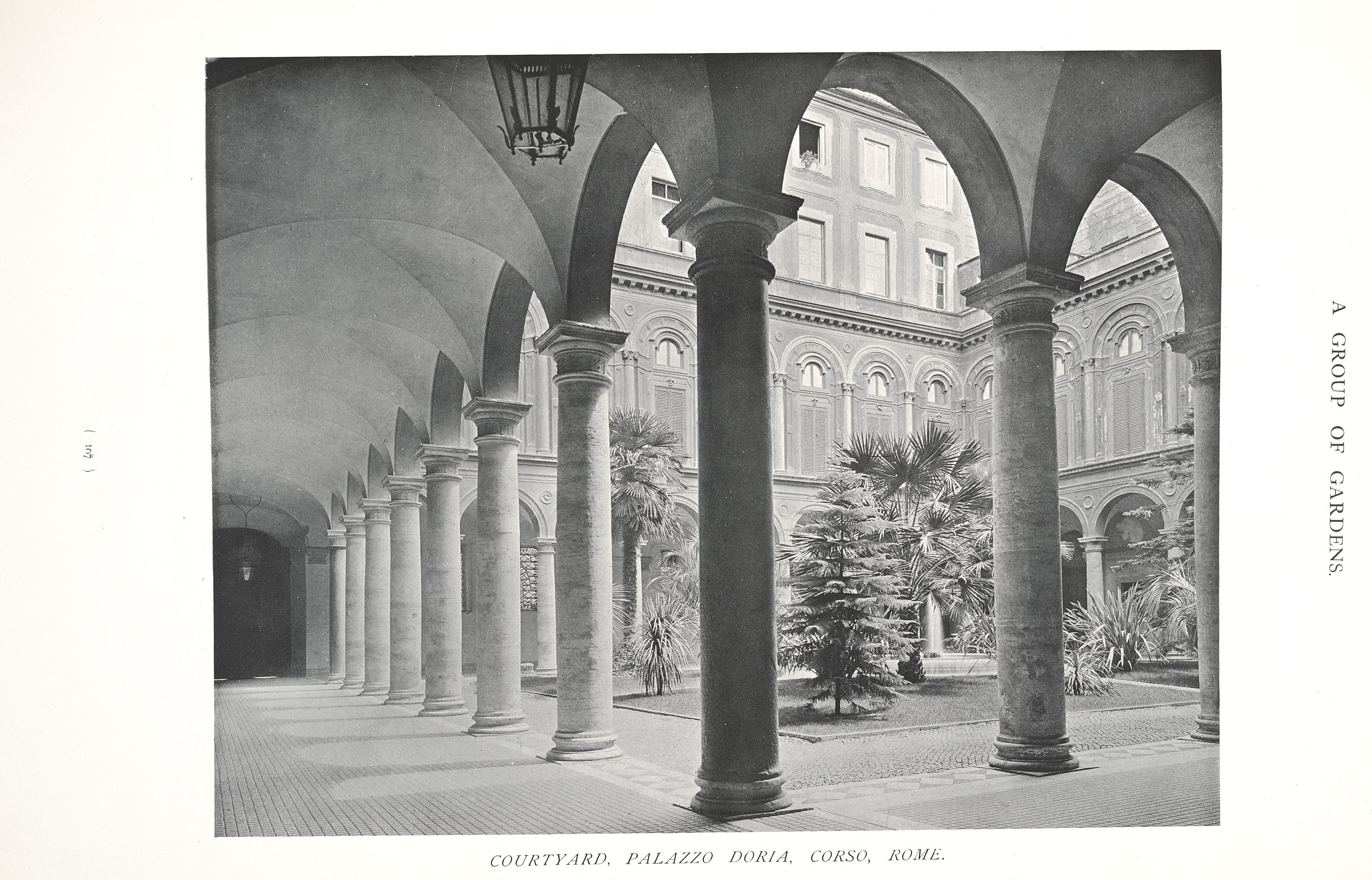
Courtyard of the Palazzo Doria. From The gardens of Italy, Published 1905.

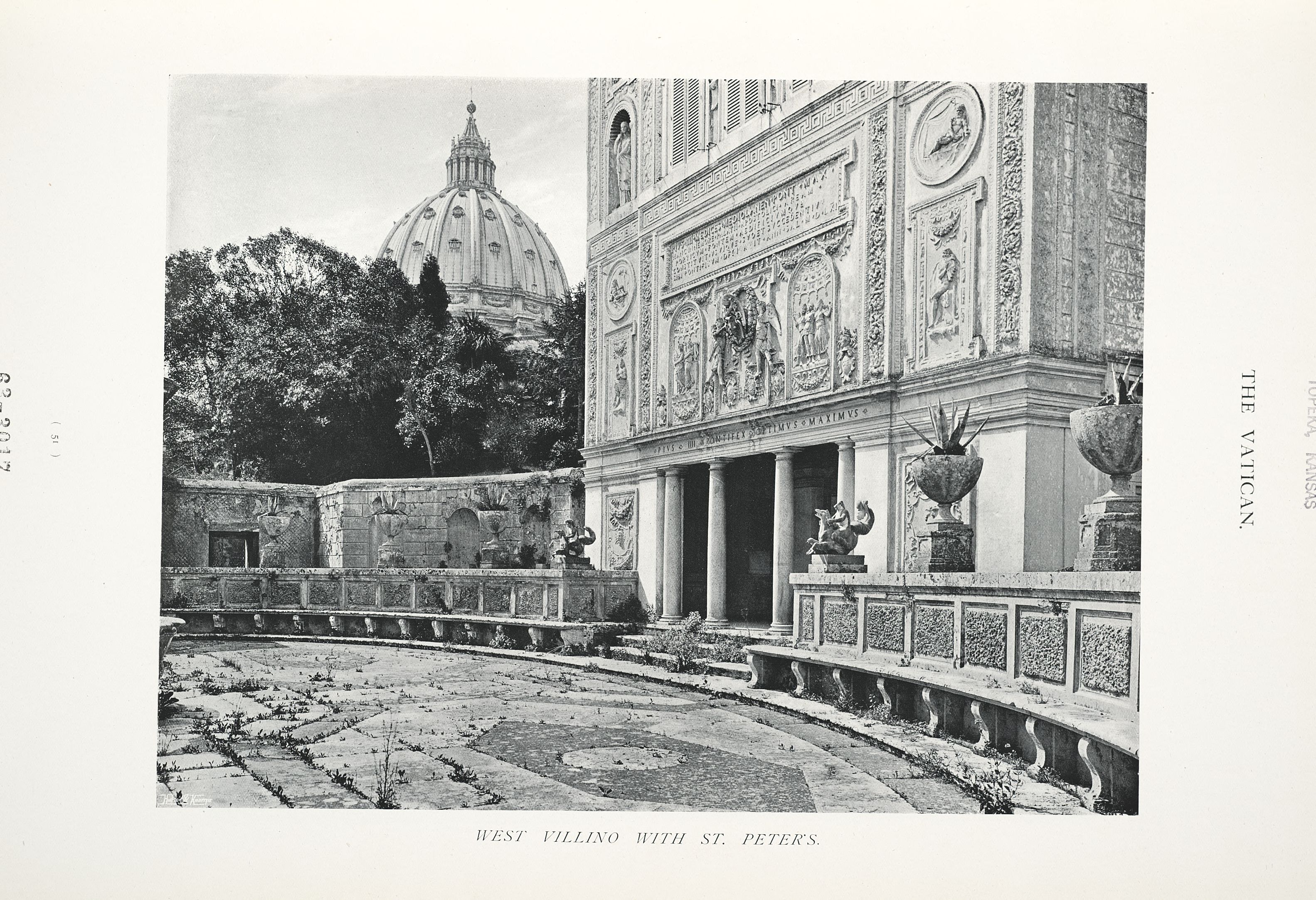
Vatican Gardens: The West Villino with the Dome of St Peters. From The gardens of Italy, Published 1905.

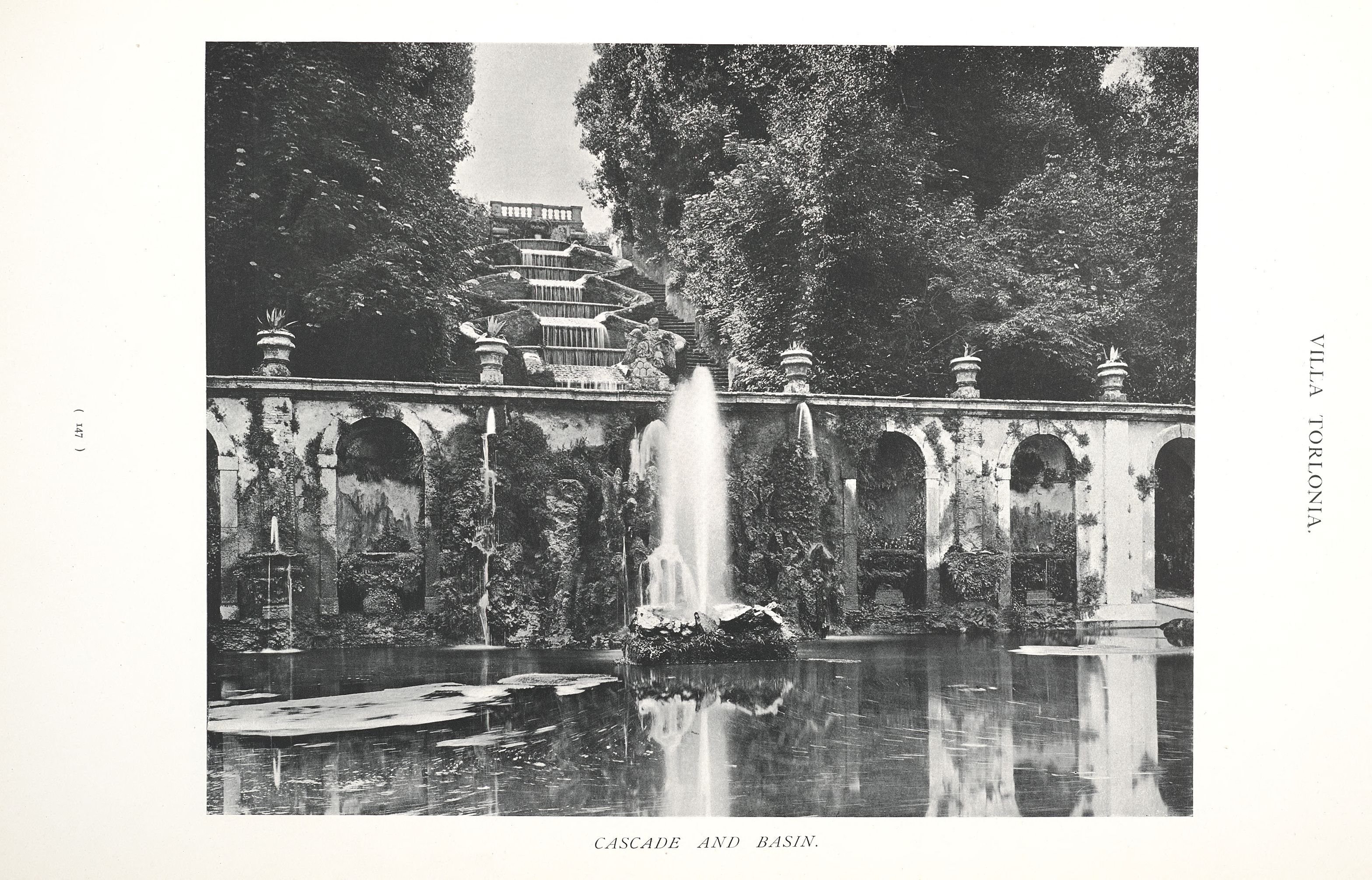
Villa Torlonia Frascati: The cascade and basin. From The gardens of Italy, Published 1905.

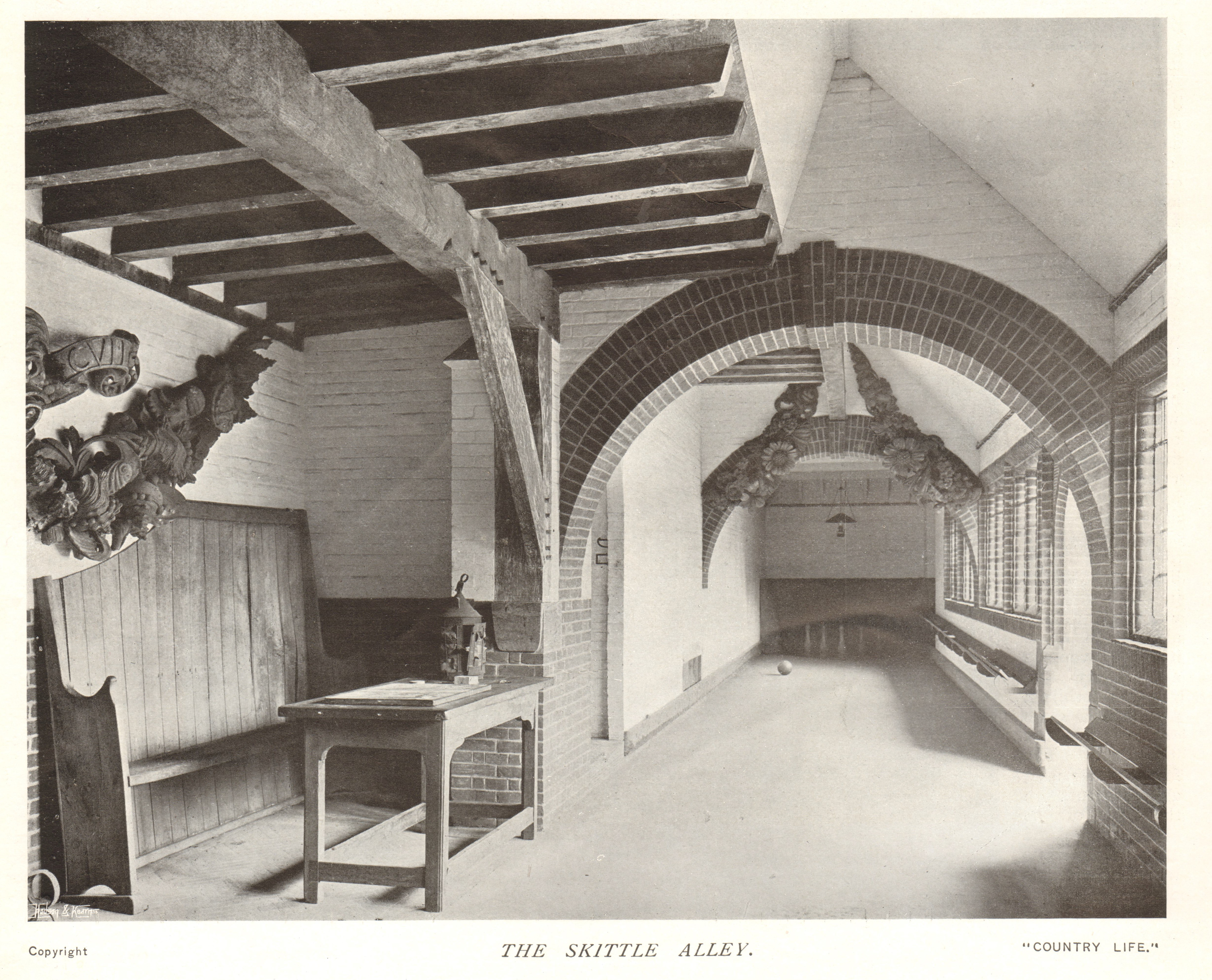
Goddards: The Skittle Alley. From Country Life 30 January 1904.
