= Fonthill =

Fonthill or Font Hill may refer to:

- Fonthill Bishop, village in Wiltshire, England
- Fonthill Gifford, village in Wiltshire, England
  - Fonthill Abbey, Fonthill Lake and Fonthill Grottoes are located between Fonthill Bishop and Fonthill Gifford
- Fonthill, Kentucky, unincorporated community in the United States
- Fonthill, Ontario, community in the town of Pelham, Ontario, Canada
- Fonthill (house), house in Doylestown, Pennsylvania, United States
- Fonthill Castle and the Administration Building of the College of Mount St. Vincent, in The Bronx, New York, New York
- Fonthill, the name of an estate belonging to United States stage actor Edwin Forrest
- Font Hill Beach, beach in Jamaica
- Font Hill Manor, historic slave plantation in Maryland, United States
