= Salisbury by-election =

Salisbury by-election may refer to one of many parliamentary by-elections held for the British House of Commons constituency of Salisbury (UK Parliament constituency), including three in the 20th century, which are:

- 1869 Salisbury by-election
- 1931 Salisbury by-election
- 1942 Salisbury by-election
- 1965 Salisbury by-election

== See also ==
- Salisbury (UK Parliament constituency)
- Salisbury District Council elections
