= List of dead heat horse races =

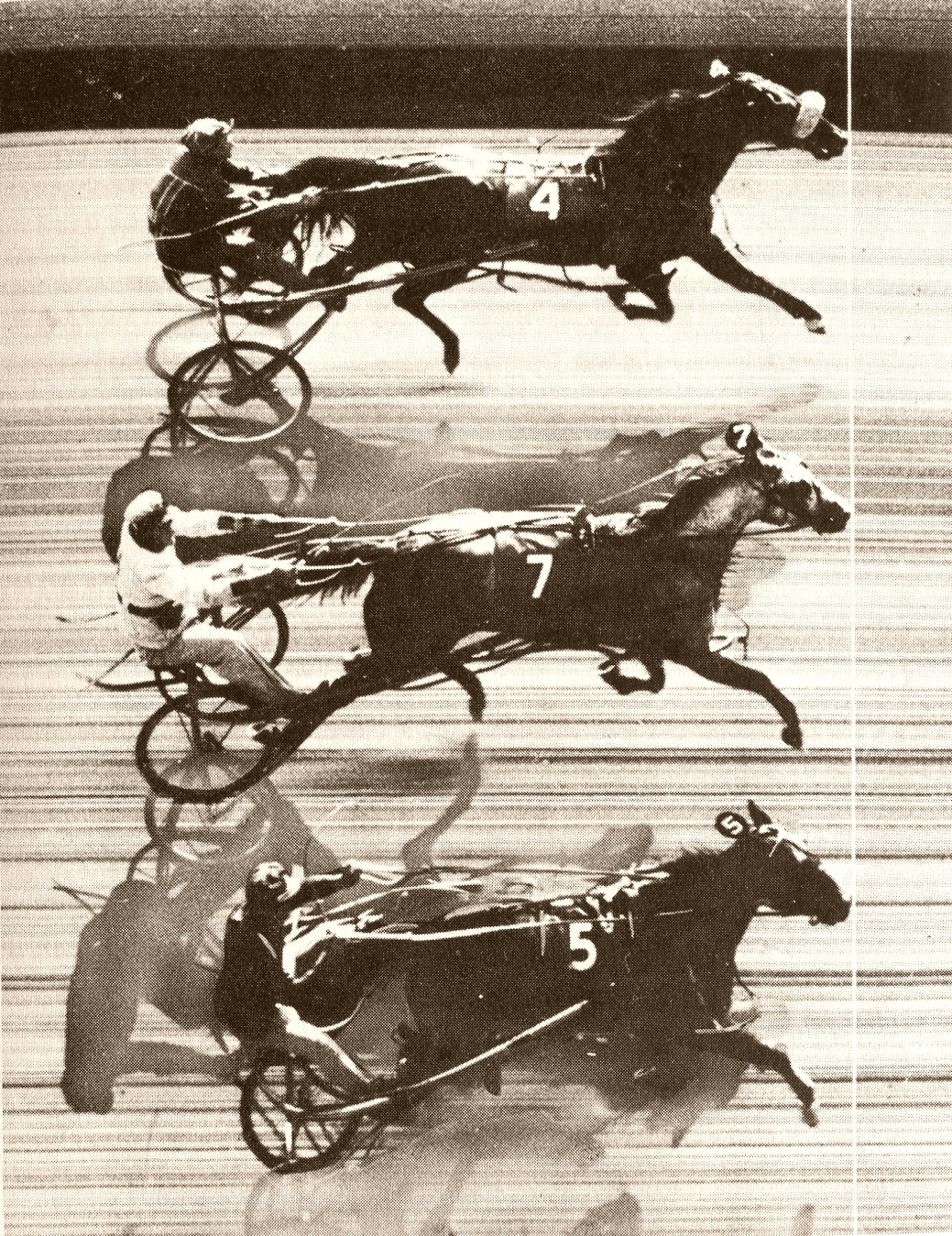
The first triple dead heat in harness racing: Patchover, Payne Hall, and Penny Maid at Freehold Raceway (USA), 1953.

This list of dead heat horse races includes wins between two or more horses, where the winner could not be determined by a photo finish. Before the 20th century, dead heat horse races could be settled by a second deciding race, unless the owners agreed to divide the prize.

- April 24, 1801 – in the King's Plate at Newmarket, between Worthy and Sorcerer, Worthy won in a deciding heat.
- May 15, 1828 – in the Epsom Derby, between Cadland and The Colonel; Cadland won in a deciding heat.
- June 21, 1832 – in the Ascot Gold Cup, between Camarine and Rowton; Camarine won in a deciding heat.
- September 18, 1850 – in the St. Leger Stakes, between Voltigeur and Russborough; Voltigeur won in a deciding heat.
- April 28, 1868 – in the 2000 Guineas, between Formosa and Moslem.
- September 3, 1879 – in the Grosser Preis von Baden between Kincsem and Prince Giles The First. Kincsem won in a deciding heat.
- May 28, 1884 – in the Epsom Derby, between Harvester and St. Gatien.
- June 13, 1900 – in the Coronation Stakes, between Sainte Nitouche and Winifreda.
- July 3, 1900 – in the July Stakes, between Doricles and Veles.
- September 27, 1910 – in the Dewhurst Plate at Newmarket Racecourse, between King William and Phryxus.
- July 5, 1926 – in the Carter Handicap at Aqueduct Racetrack, between Macaw and Nedana.
- April 18, 1927 – in the Great Eastern Steeplechase at Oakbank Racecourse between Unohoo and Mt. Cooper.
- May 4, 1939 – in the Churchill Downs Handicap at Churchill Downs, Between Arab's Arrow and Kings Blue.
- June 10, 1944 – in the Carter Handicap at Aqueduct Racetrack, between Brownie, Bossuet, and Wait A Bit; the first triple dead heat in a stakes race.
- April 1951 – in the Mildmay of Flete Challenge Cup at Cheltenham Festival, between Canford and Slender.
- March 1953 – in the St James's Place Foxhunter Chase at Cheltenham Festival, between Dunboy II and Merry.
- October 3, 1953 – at Freehold Raceway, between Patchover, Payne Hall, and Penny Maid; the first triple dead heat in harness racing for a win.
- November 3, 1956 – in the Hotham Handicap at Flemington Racecourse, Melbourne, between Fighting Force, Ark Royal, and Pandie Sun.
- July 3, 1957 – at Hollywood Park Racetrack, between Joe's Pleasure, Challenger Tom, and Leaful; the first triple dead-heat for a win at Hollywood Park.
- November 27, 1957 – at Roosevelt Raceway in New York, between Flaxey Dream, Great Knight and Navy Song.
- December 27, 1957 – at Westport Trotting Club, New Zealand, between Wimpy, Night Owl and Keff; the first trotting triple dead heat determined by a photo finish.
- October 14, 1970 – at Windsor Raceway, Ontario, between Arnold Gem, Banjo Phil, and Bervaldo.
- August 12, 1972 – in the Adios Stakes at The Meadows, between Jay Time and Strike Out.
- April, 1977 – in the Aintree Hurdle, between Monksfield and Night Nurse.
- July 6, 1980 – in the Grand Prix de Saint-Cloud, between Dunette and Shakapour.
- 19 May 1984 – in the Lockinge Stakes, between Cormorant Wood and Wassl.
- January 28, 1987 – in the Rod Carmichael Handicap at Stony Creek Racecourse, between Fast Seal, Mr Spectre and Chesterfield; a triple dead heat.
- March 13, 1988 – in the Hanshin Daishōten, between Tamamo Cross and Dyna Carpenter.
- May 2, 1988 – at Hippodrome Trois Rivieres, between Jack Des Rivieres, Kingwood Tog and H F Elaine; the fifteenth triple dead heat for a win in harness racing history.
- October 14, 1988 – in the Dewhurst Stakes, between Prince of Dance and Scenic.
- August 5, 1989 – in the Hambletonian Stakes, between Park Avenue Joe and Probe. Park Avenue Joe was declared the winner for parimutuel and prize money purposes, based on the two heat and runoff format, based on average finish (second and first in the two heats; Probe was first and ninth).
- May 13, 1995 – in the Hong Kong Champions & Chater Cup, between Makarpura Star and Survey King.
- April 6, 1996 – Between Gilhuer and Impervious at Pambula in a two horse race.
- May 12, 1996 – in the third race at Yakima Meadows, between Fly Like A Angel, Allihavonztheradio and Terri After Five; a triple dead heat.
- August 21, 1997 – in the Nunthorpe Stakes at York Racecourse, between Ya Malak and Coastal Bluff, with Alex Greaves on Ya Malak becoming the first woman to win a Group One race in Great Britain.
- December 13, 1997 – in Race 4 at Hollywood Park Racetrack, between Tina Celesta, Chans Pearl and Cool Miss Ann; a triple dead heat.
- September 26, 1998 – in the Kentucky Cup Classic, between Silver Charm and Wild Rush.
- June 4, 2001 – in the Great Northern Steeplechase at Ellerslie Racecourse, between Smart Hunter and Sir Avon.
- October 25, 2003 – in the Breeders' Cup Turf at Santa Anita Park, between High Chaparral and Johar.
- March 17, 2004 – in the Dubai Duty Free Stakes at Nad Al Sheba Racecourse, between Right Approach and Paolini.
- September 2004 – in the Doncaster Cup, between Millenary and Kasthari
- March 2006 – in the Doncaster Mile Stakes, between Kandidate and Vanderlin
- September 30, 2007 – in the Fenwolf Stakes at Ascot, between Distinction and Solent
- September 24, 2008 – in the Foundation Stakes at Goodwood, between Hearthstead Maison and Tranquil Tiger
- March 29, 2009 – at The Meadows, between Tsm Goldenridge, Serious Damage and Teen Elvis; the 25th triple dead heat in harness racing history.
- May 23, 2010 – in the 71st Yushun Himba ("Japanese Oaks") at Tokyo Racecourse, between Apapane and Saint Emilion; the first Japanese Grade I race to result in a dead heat for the win.
- November 21, 2010 – in the Jockey Club Sprint at Sha Tin Racecourse, Hong Kong, between Singapore representative Rocket Man and Hong Kong representative One World.
- December 2010 – At Kempton in the Hyde Stakes between Riggins and Fanunalter.
- April 17, 2011 – in the Maharaja Harisinghji Trophy at Mahalaxmi Racecourse, Mumbai, between Sprint Star and Misschievous Trot; the first dead heat in a graded race in the history of Indian horse racing.
- July 16, 2011 – in the American Oaks at Hollywood Park, between Cambina and Nereid.
- September 10, 2011 – in the Irish St. Leger, between Duncan and Jukebox Jury.
- August 18, 2012 – At Lingfield Park Racecourse in a two-horse race between Ayaar and Snowboarder.
- August 25, 2012 – in the Travers Stakes, between Alpha and Golden Ticket.
- March 9, 2013 – At Flemington Racecourse in the Blamey Stakes between Pussiance De Lune and Budriguez.
- May 31, 2013 – Two dead heats in back-to-back races at Belmont Park; between Anaphylaxis and Copper Forest in race 2, and between Leave of Absence and Smash in race 3.
- August 31, 2013 – in the Atalanta Stakes, between Integral and Ladys First.
- April 11, 2014 – at Evangeline Downs, between All In The Art, Chessie Slew, and Memories Of Trina; a triple dead heat.
- May 31, 2014 – in the Grand Cup at York, between Clever Cookie and Ralston Road.
- October 18, 2014 – in the Caulfield Sprint at Caulfield Racecourse, Melbourne, between Miracles of Life and Bel Sprinter.
- December 19, 2015 – in The Ladbroke Handicap Hurdle at Ascot, between Jolly's Cracked It and Sternrubin.
- September 3, 2016 – in the Spinaway Stakes at Saratoga Racecourse, between Sweet Loretta and Pretty City Dancer.
- November 12, 2016 – in the High Sheriff of Gloucestershire's Mares' Standard Open NH Flat Race at Cheltenham Racecourse, between My Khaleesi and Irish Roe.
- July 2, 2017 – in the Grade 2 Dance Smartly Stakes at Woodbine Racetrack between Starship Jubilee and Rainha Da Bateria, ridden by Eurico Rosa da Silva and Javier Castellano respectively.
- September 22, 2018 – in the Ayr Gold Cup, between Baron Bolt and Son of Rest.
- March 10, 2019 – at Hanshin Racecourse, Grade 2 Fillies' Revue ended in a dead heat between the fillies No One and Pourville, each ridden by Ryusei Sakai and Shinichiro Akiyama.
- February 20, 2021 – in the Oakleigh Plate, between Celebrity Queen and Portland Sky.
- March 6, 2021 – at Hanshin Racecourse, the Grade 2 Tulip Sho finished in a dead heat between Meikei Yell and Elizabeth Tower, each ridden by Yutaka Take and Yuga Kawada.
- May 1, 2021 – in the Old Forester Bourbon Turf Classic Stakes at Churchill Downs, between Colonel Liam and Domestic Spending.
- November 27, 2021 – At Newcastle in the Grade 1 Fighting Fifth Hurdle between Epatante and Not So Sleepy.
- March 26, 2022 – At Meydan Racecourse in the Group 1 Dubai Turf, between Lord North and Panthalassa.
- July 2, 2022 – At Woodbine Racetrack in the Grade 2 Nassau Stakes, between Crystal Cliffs and Lady Speightspeare, ridden by Rafael Hernandez and Emma-Jayne Wilson respectively.
- October 1, 2022 – in the Epsom Handicap at Royal Randwick between Top Ranked and Ellsberg.
- December 4, 2022 – At Woodbine Racetrack in the Grade 3 Valedictory Stakes, between Wentru and Who's the Star, ridden by Rafael Hernandez and Emma-Jayne Wilson respectively. Second dead heat of the year between these two jockeys, with both occurring in graded stakes races.
- August 17, 2023 – in the Sovereign Stakes at Salisbury between Mighty Ulysses and Embesto.
- June 22, 2024 – At Ayr in the Land O'Burns Fillies' Stakes between Azure Blue and Beautiful Diamond.
- October 13, 2024 – At the Velká pardubická steeplechase race between Sexy Lord and Godfrey.
- December 14, 2024 – At Cheltenham between Quantock Hills and Teriferma, ridden by brothers James and Sean Bowen.
- January 18, 2025 – At Meadowlands Racetrack, a triple dead heat in a harness race between Spirit Of Truth, Stone Cold Savage and Woodrow F Call.
- January 25, 2025 – At Kokura Racecourse, the maiden Grade 3 Kokura Himba Stakes finished in a dead heat with Verehrung and Scintillation, each ridden by Yuji Tannai and Makoto Sugihara.
- February 5, 2025 – At Louisiana Downs, a triple dead heat in a Quarter Horse race between Tf Miss Rip Too, Five Star Chick and Tg Mount Coup.
- July 30, 2025 – in the Oak Tree Stakes at Goodwood between Saqqara Sands and Tabiti.
- January 31, 2026 – in the Kachy Stakes at Lingfield between Completely Random and Diligent Harry.
- June 25, 2026 - in the Empress Stakes at Newmarket between Glorious Game and Havana Sprite.
