= Lucy Masterman =

British poet and diarist

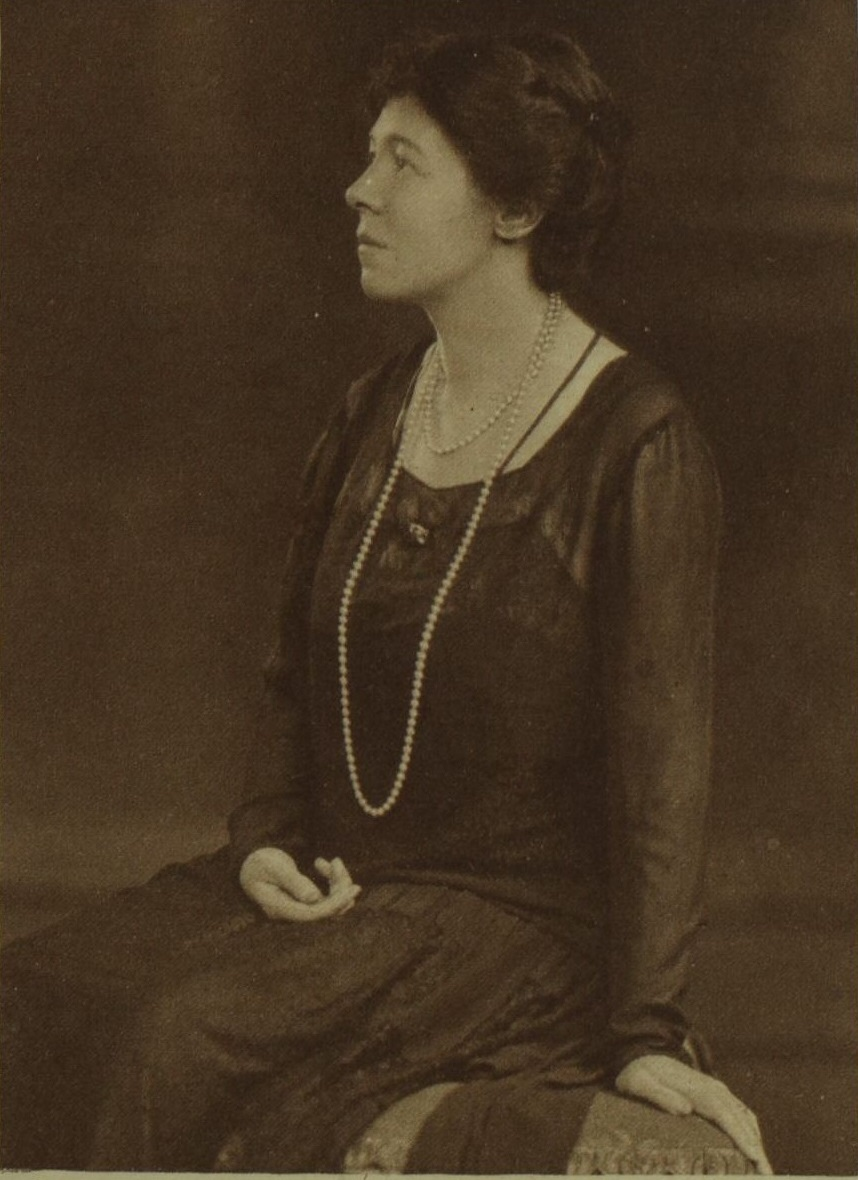
- Lucy Masterman, c. 1929
- Born: 19 July 1884
- Died: 22 April 1977 (aged 92)
- Spouse: Charles Masterman (m. 1908; died 1927)
- Children: 3, including Margaret
- Father: Neville Lyttelton
- Relatives: Lyttelton family

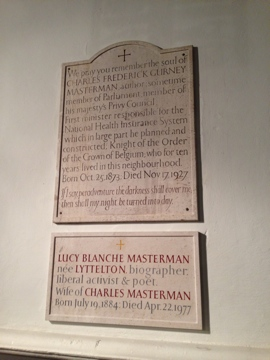
Plaque at St Giles' Church, Camberwell commemorating Lucy Masterman

Lucy Blanche Masterman (née Lyttelton; 19 July 1884 – 22 April 1977) was a British poet and diarist from the Lyttelton family. In 1908 she married the Liberal journalist Charles Masterman, who was later elected to parliament and briefly served as Chancellor of the Duchy of Lancaster. After his death, she stood for parliament unsuccessfully as a Liberal.

== Early life ==
Lyttelton was born in Gibraltar in 1884. She was the eldest daughter of General Sir Neville Lyttelton and his wife Katherine Sarah Stuart-Wortley. She joined the Fabian Society and on 2 July 1908 she married Charles Masterman. They had one son, Neville Masterman, who became a history lecturer at the University College of Swansea, and two daughters, including Margaret Masterman, a linguist, and Dorothy Masterman, who lived in Battersea.

== Literary career ==
Masterman was the author of A Book of Wild Things (1910), Lyrical Poems (1912) and Poems (1913). She worked as literary editor for Outlook and kept a diary while her husband was in government. In 1918, together with Elizabeth Lee, she published Wives of the Prime Ministers 1844-1906, and in 1939 followed this with C. F. G. Masterman: a biography. In 1930 she edited the papers of Mary Gladstone, published as Mary Gladstone (Mrs Drew): her diaries and letters. Her final publication was London from the Bus-top: A guide for the impecunious traveller (1951).

== Political career ==
When her husband was a minister then they worked as a team. She was creditted with being tougher than her husband and her near minister status made her a confidente of LLoyd George. She and her husband were in favour of giving women the vote although her husband's resolve relaxed.

After her husband died she used her diaries to create his biography.

At the 1929 General Election, two years after her husband’s death, Masterman was the Liberal candidate for the Conservative-held seat of Salisbury. The Liberals had last won the seat in 1923 and had come second in 1924. She finished a strong second, well ahead of Labour.

Masterman remained active for the Liberals in Salisbury and was again their candidate at the Salisbury by-election in March 1931, when she again finished second; after that, she continued as prospective Liberal candidate for Salisbury until being stood down in September 1931. In August of that year the Liberals and Conservatives had joined the new National Government, and the Salisbury Liberals agreed not to contest the seat. Masterman did not stand at an election again, but she remained politically active. In June 1936 she was elected to serve on the Liberal Party Council.

== Election results ==
1929 United Kingdom general election: Salisbury
Party	Candidate	Votes	%	±%
Conservative	Hugh Morrison	15,672	47.3	−9.0
Liberal	Lucy Blanche Masterman	13,022	39.3	+3.7
Labour	F. R. Hancock	4,435	13.4	+5.3
Majority		2,650	8.0	−12.7
Turnout		33,129	81.9	+0.1
Conservative hold		Swing		

1931 Salisbury by-election
Party	Candidate	Votes	%	±%
Conservative	James Archibald St George Fitzwarenne-Despencer Robertson	15,800	53.9	+6.3
Liberal	Lucy Blanche Masterman	9,588	32.7	−6.6
Labour	F. R. Hancock	3,939	13.4	+0
Majority		6,212	21.2	+13.2
Turnout		29,327	71.1	−10.8
Conservative hold		Swing	+6.6	
