= Fonthill Bishop =

Village in Wiltshire, England

Coordinates: 51.096°N 2.0940°W

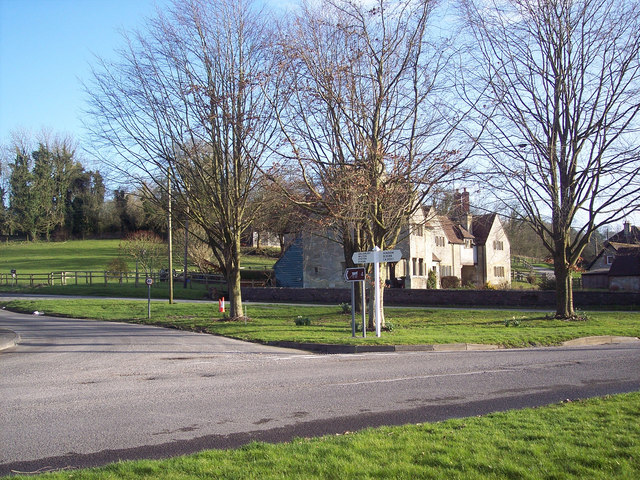
- Village green, Fonthill Bishop

- Location within Wiltshire
- Population: 93 (in 2011)
- OS grid reference: SU935330
- Civil parish: Fonthill Bishop
- Unitary authority: Wiltshire
- Ceremonial county: Wiltshire
- Region: South West
- Country: England
- Sovereign state: United Kingdom
- Post town: Salisbury
- Postcode district: SP3
- Dialling code: 01747
- Police: Wiltshire
- Fire: Dorset and Wiltshire
- Ambulance: South Western
- UK Parliament: Salisbury

Fonthill Bishop is a small village and civil parish in Wiltshire, England, to the north of the Nadder valley and 9 miles (14 km) south of Warminster.

The Fonthill Park estate extends into the south of the parish. Landscaping which included the creation of Fonthill Lake was begun in 1740 by William Beckford (later Lord Mayor of London) and continued from c. 1793 by his son William Thomas Beckford, who built Fonthill Abbey, now almost completely demolished. The estate now belongs to Alastair Morrison, 3rd Baron Margadale.

Next to the lake (but outside the parish) is the Fonthill Grottoes Site of Special Scientific Interest. Part of the Great Ridge Wood lies in the north of the parish.

== History ==
The village developed along a north–south street, bisected by the west–east road from West Knoyle and Hindon to Wilton and Salisbury (now the B3089). The shape of the village changed from the 19th century, with most buildings now on the northern half of the street and along the road.

The parish population was 77 in 1377, peaked in the early 19th century with 228 recorded at the 1821 census, then steadily declined.

== Parish church ==
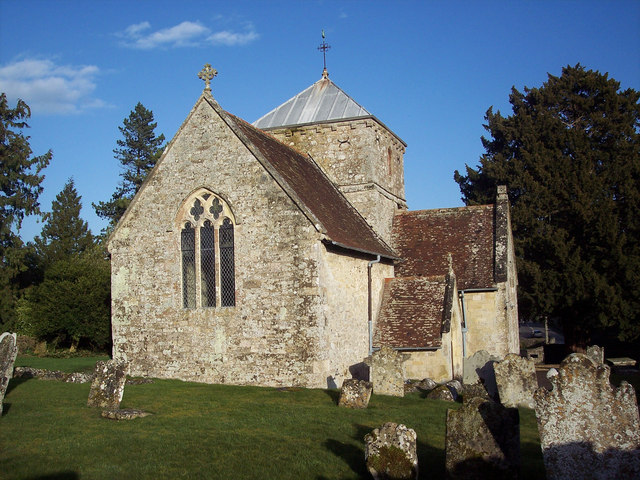
All Saints' Church

The Church of England parish church of All Saints was mentioned in 1242, and has evidence of work in the 14th and 15th centuries. Thorough restoration in 1871 and 1879 was directed by T.H. Wyatt.

The interior of the church has a 12th-century stone font and two 17th-century box pews with doors. The building was designated as Grade I listed in 1966.

In 1966 the parish of Fonthill Bishop was united with the neighbouring parish of Berwick St Leonard. Today the parish is part of the Nadder Valley Team Ministry.

== Notable buildings ==
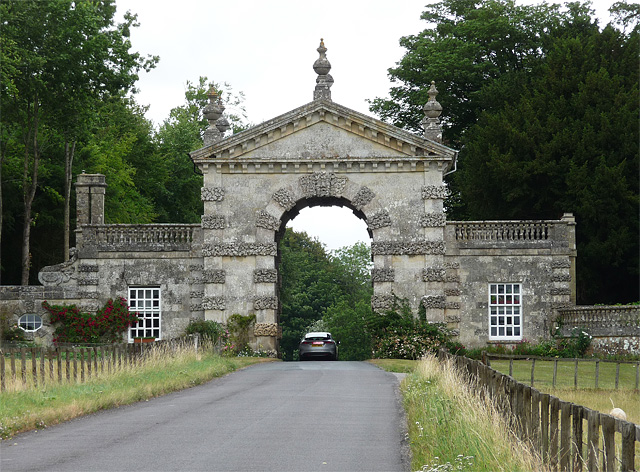
Gateway to Fonthill Park

Southwest of the village, an archway with two flanking lodges spans the road to Fonthill Gifford. This entrance to Fonthill Park was probably built c. 1756 to designs of John Vardy; long decorative walls, with urn finials, were added on both sides of the road c. 1860. The whole was designated as Grade I listed in 1966.

Structures associated with Fonthill Lake within the parish include a mid-18th century boathouse or water temple, Grade II* listed; and a bridge dated 1826 over part of the lake.

== Governance ==
The first tier of local government is a parish meeting. The parish is within the area of the Wiltshire Council unitary authority, which is responsible for almost all significant local government functions.

== Education ==
Fonthill Bishop now shares a village school, the Chilmark and Fonthill Bishop Church of England Aided Primary School, which is in the neighbouring parish of Chilmark.

By the gift of S. Gattrell, a charity school known as Gattrell's School was established at Fonthill Bishop in 1787 which provided for sixteen poor children of the parish to be taught reading and writing, the catechism of the Church of England, and needlework, free of charge. By 1833, the school also had a few "pay-scholars", for whom a charge was made. An elementary school, built c. 1841, later had places for 78 children; attendance declined during the 20th century and this school closed in 1971.

== Amenities ==
The Monarch's Way long-distance footpath passes through the village.

The King's Arms inn, trading in 1794, closed in the 1990s and is now a private house.
