= Fonthill Splendens =

Country mansion in Wiltshire, England

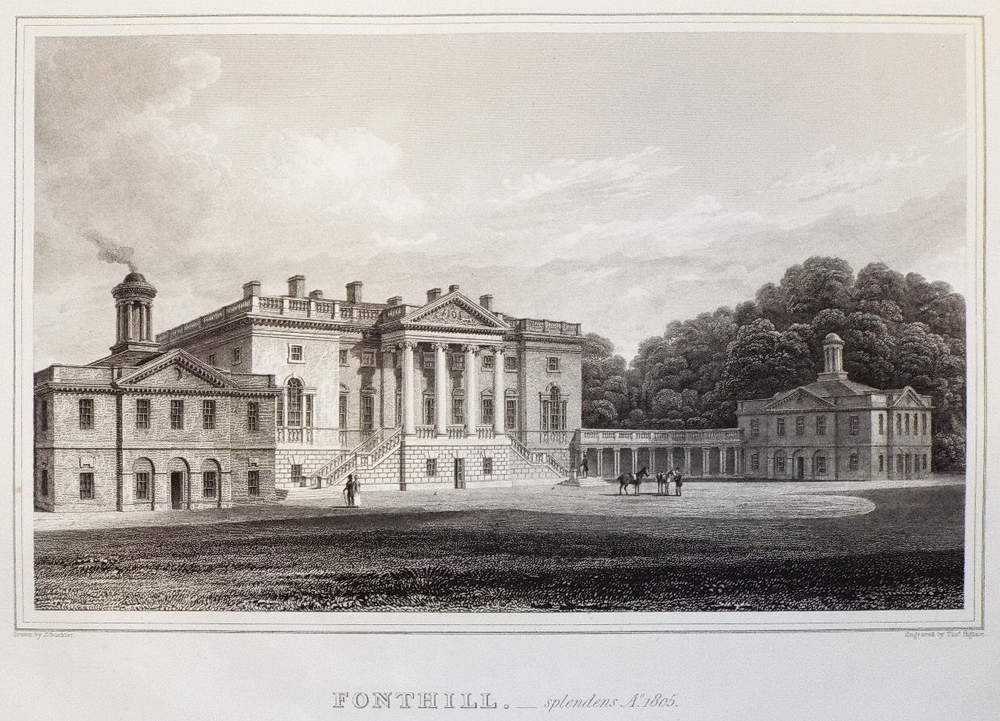
Elevation of Fonthill Splendens looking south west, after a watercolour by John Buckler, 1805–06.

Fonthill Splendens was a country mansion in Wiltshire, built by Alderman William Beckford; building began in 1755 and was largely complete by 1770. The construction followed the destruction by fire of the previous Fonthill House. The new mansion had a life of only fifty years, being demolished in 1807.

Beckford is usually referred to as Alderman Beckford to distinguish him from his better known son, William (Thomas) Beckford of Fonthill Abbey. Fonthill Splendens was a major country house of its time, but knowledge of it has largely been eclipsed by the story of his son's Gothic edifice, Fonthill Abbey.

As with the earlier building, the mansion was in its time just known as Fonthill House. The name Fonthill Splendens may have been used colloquially but only appeared in print in 1829, some twenty years after the house was demolished.

== Alderman Beckford's house ==
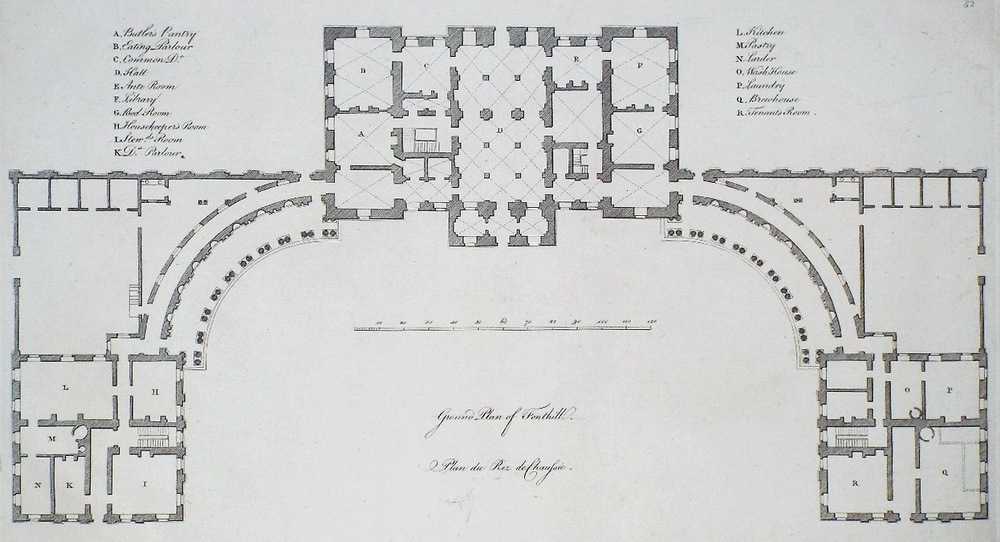
Fonthill Splendens, ground plan, illustrated in Vitruvius Britannicus, Volume 4, 1767

This substantial mansion was built in the Neo-Palladian style, largely based on the design of Houghton Hall in Norfolk. It seems that a formal architect may not have been engaged. Credit is usually given to a "Mr Hoare, a London builder". Given the closeness of Fonthill to Stourhead, James or George Hoare may have had some connection to the Hoare family.

The building consisted of a nine-bay central block on three floors. Quadrant colonnades connected this to free-standing five-bay pavilions of two floors. Two flights of steps on the north front led to a portico with pediment on four giant Ionic columns. The principal rooms were all on the first floor or piano nobile, set around a vast central hall, the Organ Hall. The basement or 'Rustick Story' floor seems to have been used for everyday living. All services such as the kitchen and brewhouse were confined to the separate wings, internal passageways in the quadrants connecting them to the central block.

Architecturally, the house was considered a rather old-fashioned design, some twenty years out of date compared to the latest styles. The interior, however, was fitted out by the Alderman in the current taste of the 1760s and was extremely richly decorated throughout, with painted ceilings, elaborate chimneypieces, velvet and damask wall hangings, a library, many oil paintings and tapestries.

He also carried out extensive landscaping works to the grounds, where the stream flowing north/south through the grounds was dammed to form Fonthill Lake. A bridge crossed the lake, and on the shore a boathouse and several grottoes were built by Joseph and his son Josiah Lane. The fine North Lodge entrance remains: an archway with pediment over and lodges either side, the facades decorated with vermiculated block rustication. The house seems to have suffered from its low-lying position close to the lake, there being many complaints over the years of it being damp.

== William Beckford’s period of ownership ==
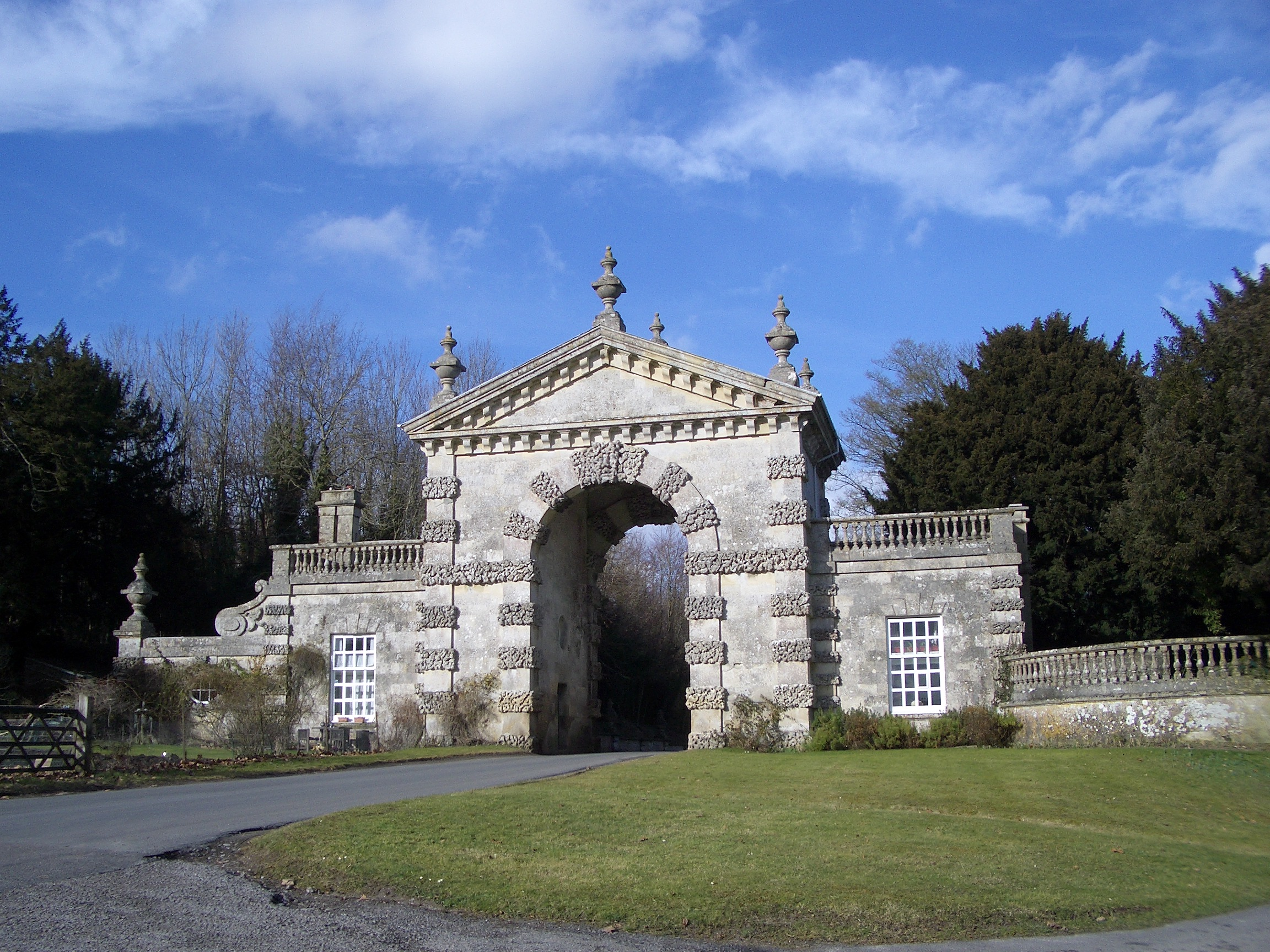
North Gateway to Fonthill Splendens, south face, built for Alderman Beckford c. 1756

Alderman Beckford died in 1770, and thereafter the house was the property of his son William Beckford, then aged ten. He lived in the house for some thirty years before moving to his Fonthill Abbey in 1801.

He was brought up in the house, and while he travelled extensively to Europe from 1777 and had various London townhouses, he nevertheless continued to carry out alterations and improvements. In particular, he restyled the interior in the neoclassical taste, even into the 1790s while he was planning and building the Abbey. His architect for Fonthill Abbey, James Wyatt, was involved in much of the redesign. In 1787, Sir John Soane prepared drawings for a picture gallery on the bedchamber floor, but the design seems not to have been carried out.

Beckford ordered the demolition of the mansion in 1807, despite being urged not to by his architect, Wyatt, and his son-in-law, Alexander, Marquess of Douglas (later the 10th Duke of Hamilton). Writing to the Marquess, he described the house as

". . . the old palace of tertian fevers with all its false Greek and false Egyptian, its small doors and mean casements . . ." and " No, my dear Douglas, I cannot honestly regret this mass of very ordinary taste . . ."

He first ordered the demolition of the east pavilion in 1801 to obtain stone for the Abbey. Then the main central block was sold and demolished in 1807. Only the west pavilion was saved, being converted into guest accommodation. Some contents were removed to the Abbey, and sales of the remainder were held in 1801 with a final sale in 1807.

== Significance ==
Variously described at the time as a "palace" and "magnificent", recent research has restored Fonthill Splendens to its place as an important building in the history of the English country house in the second half of the 18th century. In his biography of Beckford, the noted architectural historian James Lees-Milne states that "the Marquess of Douglas begged him piteously to save what was a classical masterpiece".

The volumes William Beckford 1760 – 1844: an Eye for the Magnificent and Fonthill Recovered – A Cultural History provide detailed summaries of the building, its appearance and how it was used.

In 1987 the extensive landscaped park was recorded as Grade II* on the Register of Historic Parks and Gardens.

== See also ==
- Fonthill Gifford
