= Jockey Club Rose Bowl =

Flat horse race in Britain

- Class: Listed
- Location: Rowley Mile; Newmarket, England
- Race type: Flat / Thoroughbred
- Website: Newmarket

Race information
- Distance: 2m (3,218 metres)
- Surface: Turf
- Track: Right-hand "L"
- Qualification: Three-years-old and up
- Weight: 8 st 10 lb (3yo); 9 st 5 lb (4yo+); Allowances; 5 lb for fillies and mares Penalties; 7 lb for Group 1 or 2 winners * 5 lb for Group 3 winners* 3 lb for Listed winners* * since 31 March
- Purse: £50,000 (2025); 1st: £28,355

Jockey Club Rose Bowl
2024
| Al Nayyir | Harbour Wind | Samui |

Previous years
2023
Trawlerman | Island Brave | Only two finished
2022
Nate The Great | Thunderous | Skycutter
2021
Nayef Road | Roberto Escobarr | Max Vega

2020-2011
2020
Ranch Hand | Withhold | Ghostwatch
2019
Withhold | Austrian School | Platitude
2018
Nearly Caught | Sheikhzayedroad | Ben Vrackie
2017
Face The Facts | Nearly Caught | Uae King
2016
Justice Belle | Seamour | Fun Mac
2015
Flying Officer | Angel Gabrial | Gale Force
2014
Pallasator | Flying Officer | Novirak
2013
Caucus | Statutory | Body Language
2012
Caucus | Cavalryman | Lost In The Moment
2011
Times Up | Chiberta King | Nehaam

2010-2003
2010
Fictional Account | Free Agent | Pompeyano
2009
Electrolyser | Oasis Knight | Swingkeel
2008
Metaphoric | Balkan Knight | Sagara
2007
Distinction | Solent | Sunley Peace
2006
Hawridge Prince | Frank Sonata | Lost Soldier Three
2005
Land 'n Stars | Larkwing | Sendintank
2004
Defining | Swift Tango | Supremacy
2003
Supremacy | Manama Rose | Flownaway

The Jockey Club Rose Bowl is a Listed flat horse race in Great Britain open to horses aged three years or older. It is run at Newmarket over a distance of 2 miles (3,218 metres), and it is scheduled to take place each year in September.

The race was first run, as the Fenwolf Stakes, at Ascot in 2003. It was given its current name and transferred to Newmarket in 2011.

== Winners ==
| Year | Winner | Age | Jockey | Trainer | Time |
|---|---|---|---|---|---|
| 2003 | Supremacy | 4 | Kieren Fallon | Sir Michael Stoute | 3:34.87 |
| 2004 | Defining | 5 | Johnny Murtagh | James Fanshawe | 3:35.71 |
| 2005 (Note: The 2005 edition was held at Newmarket as Ascot was closed for development) | Land 'n Stars | 5 | Paul Doe | Jamie Poulton | 3:24.26 |
| 2006 | Hawridge Prince | 6 | Jim Crowley | Rod Millman | 3:36.85 |
| 2007 (dh) | Distinction; Solent | 8; 5 | Ryan Moore; Jimmy Fortune | Michael Stoute; Richard Hannon Sr. | 3:39.72 |
| 2008 | Metaphoric | 4 | Jamie Spencer | Michael Bell | 3:26.90 |
| 2009 | Electrolyser | 4 | Philip Robinson | Clive Cox | 3:31.71 |
| 2010 | Fictional Account | 5 | William Buick | Vincent Ward | 3:32.86 |
| 2011 | Times Up | 5 | Eddie Ahern | John Dunlop | 3:18.64 |
| 2012 | Caucus | 5 | William Buick | John Gosden | 3:23.04 |
| 2013 | Caucus | 6 | William Buick | John Gosden | 3:25.74 |
| 2014 | Pallasator | 5 | Andrea Atzeni | Sir Mark Prescott | 3:26.27 |
| 2015 | Flying Officer | 5 | Frankie Dettori | John Gosden | 3:30.94 |
| 2016 | Justice Belle | 4 | Frankie Dettori | Ed Walker | 3:24.13 |
| 2017 | Face The Facts | 3 | Ted Durcan | John Gosden | 3:24.66 |
| 2018 | Nearly Caught | 8 | Ryan Moore | Hughie Morrison | 3:24.20 |
| 2019 | Withhold | 6 | Jason Watson | Roger Charlton | 3:25.44 |
| 2020 | Ranch Hand | 4 | Oisin Murphy | Andrew Balding | 3:23.71 |
| 2021 | Nayef Road | 5 | Andrea Atzeni | Mark Johnston | 3:19.77 |
| 2022 | Nate The Great | 6 | William Buick | Andrew Balding | 3:26.66 |
| 2023 | Trawlerman | 5 | Frankie Dettori | John & Thady Gosden | 3:24.77 |
| 2024 | Al Nayyir | 6 | Luke Morris | Tom Clover | 3:34.56 |
| 2025 | Miss Alpilles | 4 | Kieran Shoemark | Ed Walker | 3:25.91 |
| 2026 | Gregory | 6 | James Doyle | John & Thady Gosden | 3:19.59 |

== See also ==
- Horse racing in Great Britain
- List of British flat horse races
