= Fonthill Lake =

Lake in Wiltshire, England

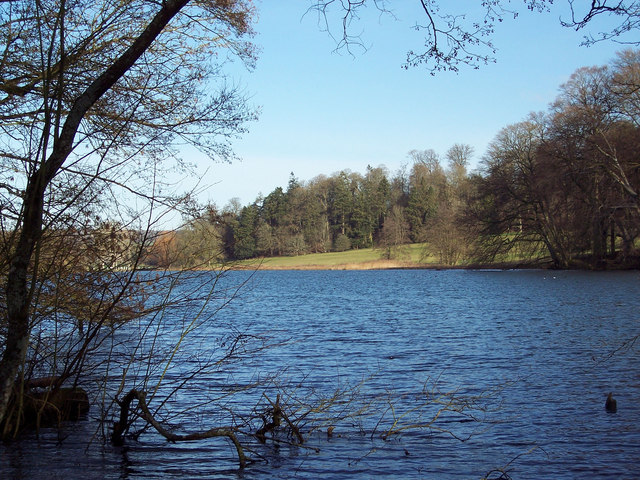

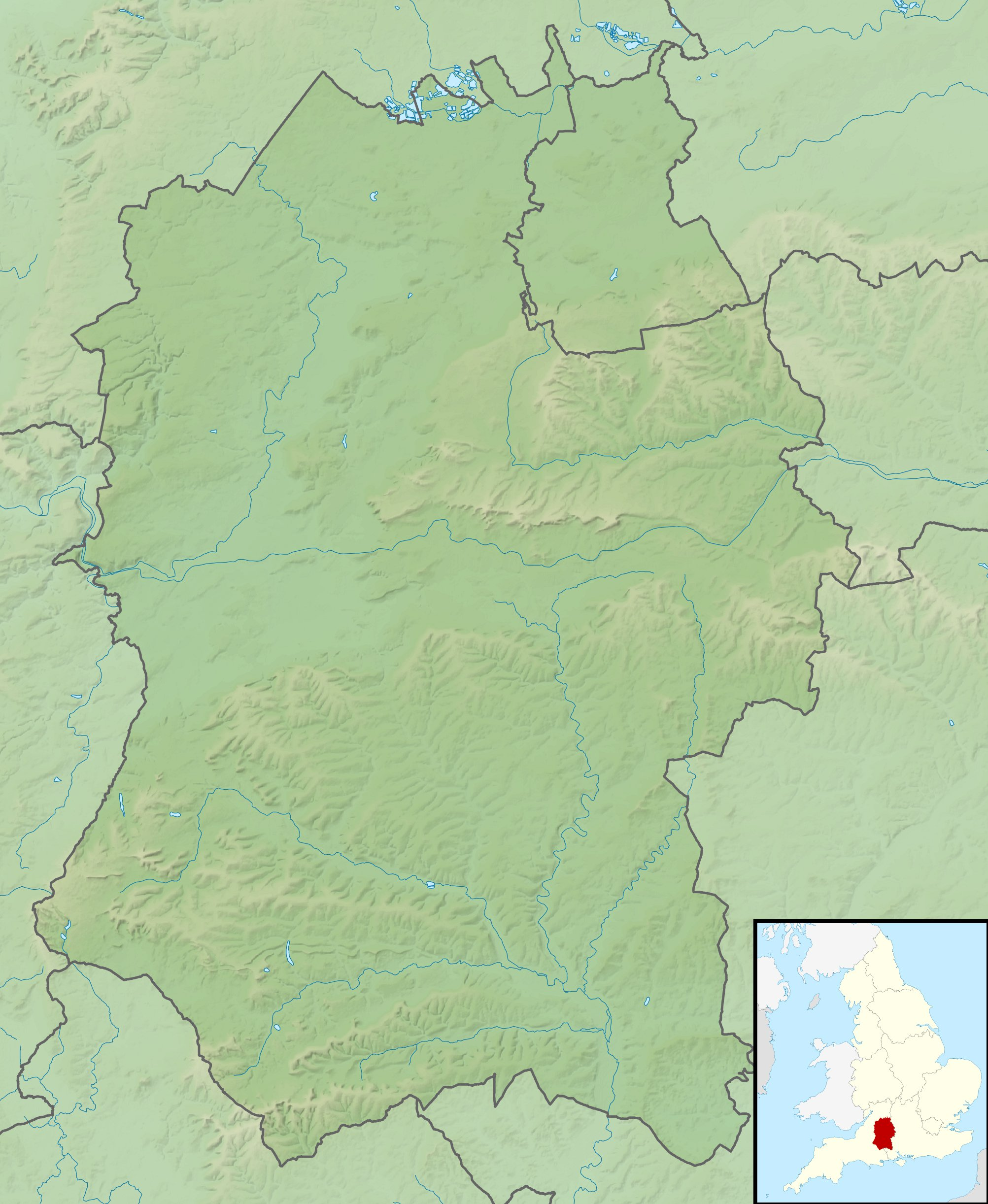
- Location within Wiltshire
- Location: Wiltshire, England
- Coordinates: 51.0886°N 2.0959°W
- Basin countries: United Kingdom
- Max. length: 1.3 km (0.81 mi)
- Max. width: 100 m (328 ft)

Fonthill Lake (grid reference ST933319) is a lake in southwest Wiltshire, England. It lies just to the south of the village of Fonthill Bishop, east of the village of Fonthill Gifford, and northeast of Fonthill Abbey. The lake is 1.6 km (1 mi) long and approximately 100 m (328 ft) wide at its maximum breadth.

The Fonthill Brook flows out of the southern end of the lake and joins the River Nadder at Tisbury, 2 km (1 mi) to the southeast.

The lake was created in the mid-18th century by building a weir below fish-ponds fed by the brook, for Alderman William Beckford, the builder of the house later known as Fonthill Splendens. In 1987 the extensive landscaped park, including the lake, was recorded as Grade II* on the Register of Historic Parks and Gardens.

A sizeable population of the introduced Mandarin duck is resident at Fonthill Lake (and on surrounding rivers) together with a number of wild swans.

The lake was used as the location for the filming of the river scenes in the 2000 film Chocolat, which starred Juliette Binoche and Johnny Depp. It is also where the ashes of pioneering Everest mountaineer Eric Shipton were scattered.

== See also ==
- Fonthill Grottoes
