= Michael Hamilton (politician) =

British politician (1918–2000)

- Born: Michael Aubrey Hamilton; 5 July 1918; England
- Died: 3 July 2000 (aged 81); Chichester, West Sussex, England
- Occupation: Politician

Sir Michael Aubrey Hamilton (5 July 1918 – 3 July 2000) was a British Conservative Party politician.

Hamilton was educated at Radley and University College, Oxford. He was a director of Royal Exchange Assurance and of Army & Navy Stores.

Hamilton was elected member of parliament (MP) for Wellingborough in 1959, which he lost in 1964. He was then elected for Salisbury at a 1965 by-election, which he represented until he retired in 1983. He was an opposition whip from 1961 to 1964, a senior one from the second year (a Lord Commissioner of the Treasury). He was knighted in the 1983 Birthday Honours. He died in Chichester, West Sussex two days before his 82nd birthday.

Parliament of the United Kingdom
Preceded by George Lindgren	Member of Parliament for Wellingborough; 1959–1964	Succeeded by Harry Howarth
Preceded by John Morrison	Member of Parliament for Salisbury; 1965–1983	Succeeded by Robert Key
