= James Morrison, 2nd Baron Margadale =

British peer (1930–2003)

The Right Honourable The Lord Margadale TD DL

Member of the House of Lords
- Lord Temporal
- In office 25 May 1996 – 11 November 1999 as a hereditary peer
- Preceded by: The 1st Baron Margadale
- Succeeded by: Seat abolished (Note: Pursuant to the House of Lords Act 1999.)

Personal details
- Born: James Ian Morrison; 17 July 1930
- Died: 6 April 2003 (aged 72)

Major James Ian Morrison, 2nd Baron Margadale (17 July 1930 – 6 April 2003), was a British hereditary peer.

== Early life and education ==
Morrison was the eldest son of Major John Morrison, 1st Baron Margadale, and his wife, the Hon. Margaret Esther Lucie (née Smith), daughter of Frederick Smith, 2nd Viscount Hambleden, of the WHSmith family.

Morrison was educated at Ludgrove School, Eton and at the Royal Agricultural College (now Royal Agricultural University).

== Career ==
Morrison was commissioned into the Life Guards in 1949 before transferring into the Royal Wiltshire Yeomanry and reaching the rank of Major in 1964. He was a member of Wiltshire County Council in 1955 and again from 1973 to 1977, as well as chairman of the West Wiltshire Conservative Association from 1967 to 1971. He went on to be appointed as Honorary Colonel of the Royal Wiltshire Yeomanry in 1982 and then of the Royal Wessex Yeomanry from 1984 until 1989.

The family seat is the Fonthill estate in southern Wiltshire. Morrison took over the Fonthill Stud from his father in 1972 and had success in several classic horse races.

Morrison succeeded to the barony and to a seat in the House of Lords upon his father's death in 1996. He ceased to be a member of the Lords on 11 November 1999 following the enactment of the House of Lords Act 1999.

== Marriage and children ==
Morrison married Clare Barclay on 14 October 1952. They had three children:

- Hon. Fiona Elizabeth Morrison (born 11 November 1954), married Hugh Trenchard, 3rd Viscount Trenchard, in 1975 and has four children.
- Alastair John Morrison, 3rd Baron Margadale (born 4 April 1958), married Lady Sophia Cavendish (daughter of Andrew Cavendish, 11th Duke of Devonshire, and the Hon. Deborah Freeman-Mitford) in 1988 and has two children.
- Hon. Hugh "Hughie" Morrison (born 7 November 1960), married Jane Jenks in 1986 and has two children.

== Death ==
Lord Margadale died in April 2003 at the age of 72. He was succeeded in the barony by his elder son, Alastair.

== Arms ==
Coat of arms of James Morrison, 2nd Baron Margadale
Crest Three Saracens' heads conjoined in one neck one looking to the dexter one affrontée and one looking to the sinister all Proper Escutcheon Tierced in pairle Azure Sable and Gules in chief a Saracen's head couped affrontée and in base two Saracens' heads addorsed in profile all Argent and at the fess point an inescutcheon parted per pale dexter per bend sinister embattled Gules and Or in dexter chief a battleaxe paleways Argent and in sinister base issuant from a base undy Azure and Argent a tower Sable masoned Argent port Gules (Morrison of Islay) sinister Vert powdered with bezants a horse rearing on its hind legs Argent langued and hoofed Gules (Lordship of Margadale) Supporters On either side a woodcock Proper Motto Praetio Prudentia Praestat (Prudence Before Any Thought Of A Reward) Badge Through an annulet Argent a sword in pale point upwards Proper

== Notes ==
Peerage of the United Kingdom
Preceded by John Morrison	Baron Margadale; 1996–2003; Member of the House of Lords (1996–1999)	Succeeded by Alastair Morrison
