= 2007 Salisbury District Council election =

2007 UK local government election

- 3 May 2007
	Con	LD
Party	Conservative	Liberal Democrats
Popular vote	15,861	11,723
Percentage	39.0%	28.8%
	Lab	Ind
Party	Labour	Independent
Popular vote	4,430	4,031
Percentage	10.9%	9.9%
Council control before election
Conservative
Council control after election
No overall control

Elections to Salisbury District Council were held on 3 May 2007. The whole council was up for election, and the Conservatives lost overall control, but were still the largest party winning twenty-two of the fifty-five seats available.

This was the last election of district councillors to take place in Salisbury. The following year, a government review of local government determined that the four district councils of Wiltshire were to be merged with Wiltshire County Council to form a new unitary authority with effect from 1 April 2009, when Salisbury would be abolished and its councillors' term of office would end two years early.

Elections to the new unitary authority, Wiltshire Council, took place in June 2009.

== Election result ==
Salisbury District Council elections, 2007
Party	Seats	Gains	Losses	Net gain/loss	Seats %	Votes %	Votes	+/−
Conservative	22	2	11	–9	40.7	39.0	15,861	
Liberal Democrats	19	10	0	+10	35.2	28.8	11,723	
Labour	10	0	1	–1	18.5	10.9	4,430	
Independent	4	1	1	0	7.4	9.9	4,031	
Green	0	0	0	0	0.0	6.9	2,801	
UKIP	0	0	0	0	0.0	4.6	1,854	

== Electoral division results ==
=== Alderbury and Whiteparish ===
Alderbury and Whiteparish (3 seats)
Party	Candidate	Votes	%	±%
Conservative	Leo Randall	1,198		
Conservative	Richard Clewer	1,097		
Conservative	Richard Britton	1,067		
Green	Barbara Bayfield	626		
UKIP	Judith Wykeham	532		
UKIP	Neville Bush	528		
UKIP	Michael Wykeham	468		
Majority				
Conservative hold		Swing		
Conservative hold		Swing		
Conservative hold		Swing		

=== Amesbury East ===
Amesbury East (3 seats)
Party	Candidate	Votes	%	±%
Conservative	Dennis Brown	909		
Conservative	John Noeken	849		
Conservative	Ian Mitchell	836		
Liberal Democrats	Jan Swindlehurst	642		
Liberal Democrats	Hannah Muirhead	574		
Liberal Democrats	Nathan Muirhead	533		
UKIP	Margaret Strange of Balcaskie	377		
Green	Jayne Downton	290		
Majority				
Conservative hold		Swing		
Conservative hold		Swing		
Conservative hold		Swing		

=== Amesbury West ===
Amesbury West
Party	Candidate	Votes	%	±%
Conservative	Fred Westmoreland	381	67.0	
Green	Christine Bell	188	33.0	
Majority				
Conservative hold		Swing		

=== Bemerton ===
Bemerton (3 seats)
Party	Candidate	Votes	%	±%
Labour	Iris Evans	782		
Labour	Clive Vincent	713		
Labour	Michael Osment	653		
Conservative	Pete Kell	437		
Conservative	Tony Morland	424		
Majority				
Labour hold		Swing		
Labour hold		Swing		
Labour hold		Swing		

=== Bishopdown ===
Bishopdown (2 seats)
Party	Candidate	Votes	%	±%
Liberal Democrats	John English	698		
Conservative	Kevin Cardy	561		
Conservative	Penny Brown	538		
Labour	Richard Rogers	421		
Majority				
Liberal Democrats gain from Conservative		Swing		
Conservative hold		Swing		

=== Bulford ===
Bulford (2 seats)
Party	Candidate	Votes	%	±%
Conservative	John Smale	unopposed	n/a	n/a
Liberal Democrats	James Spencer	unopposed	n/a	n/a
Conservative hold		Swing		
Liberal Democrats hold		Swing		

=== Chalke Valley ===
Chalke Valley
Party	Candidate	Votes	%	±%
Independent	Ted Draper	589	87.4	
Green	Maggie Shepherd	85	12.6	
Majority		504		
Independent hold		Swing		

=== Donhead ===
Donhead
Party	Candidate	Votes	%	±%
Conservative	John-Anthony Cole-Morgan	579	71.2	
Liberal Democrats	John Edgley	234	28.8	
Majority		345		
Conservative hold		Swing		

=== Downton and Redlynch ===
Downton and Redlynch (3 seats)
Party	Candidate	Votes	%	±%
Conservative	Jane Launchbury	1,108		
Conservative	David Luther	961		
Conservative	Caroline Morrison	924		
Liberal Democrats	Pamela Edge	507		
Liberal Democrats	Vincent Reilly	410		
Green	Adam Gent	396		
Green	Stephanie Jalland	359		
Majority				
Conservative hold		Swing		
Conservative hold		Swing		
Conservative gain from Labour		Swing		

=== Durrington ===
Durrington (3 seats)
Party	Candidate	Votes	%	±%
Liberal Democrats	Jo Broom	802		
Liberal Democrats	Graham Wright	787		
Liberal Democrats	Martin Lee	740		
Conservative	Mark Baker	673		
Conservative	John Rodell	646		
Conservative	Cathy Hollis	589		
Majority				
Liberal Democrats hold		Swing		
Liberal Democrats gain from Conservative		Swing		
Liberal Democrats gain from Conservative		Swing		

=== Ebble ===
Ebble
Party	Candidate	Votes	%	±%
Conservative	Bryan Rycroft	360	50.3	
Independent	Hedley Farris	237	33.3	
Green	Jan Bradford	60	8.4	
UKIP	Pauline Pratt	58	8.1	
Majority		123		
Conservative hold		Swing		

=== Fisherton and Bemerton Village ===
Fisherton and Bemerton Village (2 seats)
Party	Candidate	Votes	%	±%
Labour	John Walsh	560		
Labour	Andrew Roberts	518		
Liberal Democrats	Gregor Condliffe	484		
Liberal Democrats	Russell Morley	464		
Conservative	Ben Frost	313		
Majority				
Labour hold		Swing		
Labour hold		Swing		

=== Fonthill and Nadder ===
Fonthill and Nadder
Party	Candidate	Votes	%	±%
Independent	David Parker	419	51.6	
Conservative	Tony Deane	393	48.4	
Majority		26		
Independent gain from Conservative		Swing		

=== Harnham East ===
Harnham East (2 seats)
Party	Candidate	Votes	%	±%
Liberal Democrats	Helena McKeown	817		
Liberal Democrats	Cheryl Hill	778		
Conservative	Donald Culver	551		
Conservative	Williams Snow	544		
Majority				
Liberal Democrats gain from Conservative		Swing		
Liberal Democrats gain from Conservative		Swing		

=== Harnham West ===
Harnham West (2 seats)
Party	Candidate	Votes	%	±%
Liberal Democrats	Murial Tomlinson	813		
Liberal Democrats	Brian Dalton	803		
Conservative	Josa Snow	335		
Conservative	Anthony von Roretz	321		
UKIP	Frances Howard	117		
Independent	Colin Duller	97		
UKIP	Tony Gatling	88		
Labour	Malcolm Simmons	76		
Majority				
Liberal Democrats hold		Swing		
Liberal Democrats hold		Swing		

=== Knoyle ===
Knoyle
Party	Candidate	Votes	%	±%
Conservative	Michael Fowler	660	84.7	
UKIP	Elaine Cadogan	119	15.3	
Majority		541		
Conservative hold		Swing		

=== Laverstock ===
Laverstock (2 seats)
Party	Candidate	Votes	%	±%
Labour	Ian McLennan	728		
Conservative	John King	626		
UKIP	Patrick Houston	378		
Green	Alexander Langlands	363		
UKIP	Frederick Dickenson	217		
Majority				
Labour hold		Swing		
Conservative hold		Swing		

=== Lower Wylye and Woodford Valley ===
Lower Wylye and Woodford Valley
Party	Candidate	Votes	%	±%
Liberal Democrats	Sarah Dennis	393	53.3	
Conservative	John Brady	344	46.7	
Majority		49		
Liberal Democrats gain from Conservative		Swing		

=== St Edmund and Milford ===
St Edmund and Milford (2 seats)
Party	Candidate	Votes	%	±%
Liberal Democrats	Bobbie Chettleburgh	1,171		
Liberal Democrats	Paul Sample	1,128		
Green	Sue Wright	302		
Conservative	David Robinson	284		
Majority				
Liberal Democrats hold		Swing		
Liberal Democrats hold		Swing		

=== St Mark and Stratford ===
St Mark and Stratford (3 seats)
Party	Candidate	Votes	%	±%
Liberal Democrats	James Robertson	1,379		
Liberal Democrats	Tony Thorpe	1,370		
Liberal Democrats	Ian Curr	1,364		
Conservative	Patrick Paisey	898		
Conservative	Jeremy Nettle	881		
Conservative	Derek Brown	855		
Majority				
Liberal Democrats gain from Conservative		Swing		
Liberal Democrats gain from Conservative		Swing		
Liberal Democrats gain from Conservative		Swing		

=== St Martin and Milford ===
St Martin and Milford (2 seats)
Party	Candidate	Votes	%	±%
Labour	Ian Tomes	716		
Labour	Simon Howarth	684		
Conservative	Chris Cochrane	489		
Liberal Democrats	Hilary Phelps	485		
Liberal Democrats	Robert Steel	464		
Conservative	Tom Griffiths	451		
Majority				
Labour hold		Swing		
Labour hold		Swing		

=== St Paul ===
St Paul (2 seats)
Party	Candidate	Votes	%	±%
Labour	Steven Fear	703		
Labour	Paul Clegg	652		
Conservative	John Lindley	310		
Majority				
Labour hold		Swing		
Labour hold		Swing		

=== Till Valley and Wylye ===
Till Valley and Wylye (2 seats)
Party	Candidate	Votes	%	±%
Liberal Democrats	Ian West	1,113		
Liberal Democrats	Colin Mills	1,074		
Conservative	Nicholas Gallop	543		
UKIP	Jennifer MacDougall	273		
Majority				
Liberal Democrats hold		Swing		
Liberal Democrats hold		Swing		

=== Tisbury and Fovant ===
Tisbury and Fovant (2 seats)
Party	Candidate	Votes	%	±%
Independent	Josephine Green	946		
Conservative	Richard Beattie	800		
Liberal Democrats	Felicity Corp	466		
Liberal Democrats	Mike Lennard	362		
Majority				
Independent hold		Swing		
Conservative gain from Independent		Swing		

=== Upper Bourne, Idmiston and Winterbourne ===
Upper Bourne, Idmiston and Winterbourne (2 seats)
Party	Candidate	Votes	%	±%
Conservative	Kevin Wren	850		
Conservative	Mike Hewitt	802		
Independent	Paul Fisher	732		
Green	Hilary Munro	491		
Labour	Virginia McLennan	207		
Majority				
Conservative hold		Swing		
Conservative hold		Swing		

=== Western and Mere ===
Western and Mere (2 seats)
Party	Candidate	Votes	%	±%
Independent	George Jeans	1,011		
Conservative	Catherine Spencer	1,011		
Liberal Democrats	Timothy Payne	300		
Majority				
Independent hold		Swing		
Conservative hold		Swing		

=== Wilton ===
Wilton (2 seats)
Party	Candidate	Votes	%	±%
Liberal Democrats	Peter Edge	820		
Liberal Democrats	John Holt	665		
Conservative	Anthony Brown-Hovelt	471		
Conservative	Jim Rhind-Tutt	393		
Labour	Dave Roberts	137		
Majority				
Liberal Democrats hold		Swing		
Liberal Democrats gain from Conservative		Swing		

=== Winterslow ===
Winterslow (2 seats)
Party	Candidate	Votes	%	±%
Conservative	Bill Moss	777		
Conservative	Christopher Devine	700		
Liberal Democrats	Bridget Salisbury	599		
Liberal Democrats	Colin Baxter	529		
Labour	Mark Riches	100		
Majority				
Conservative hold		Swing		
Conservative hold		Swing		

== See also ==
- Salisbury District Council elections
