= Hugh Moulton =

British Liberal politician (1876-1962)

Hugh Lawrence Fletcher Moulton MC
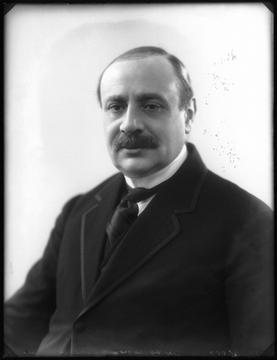
- Hugh Moulton

Member of Parliament for Salisbury
- In office 1923–1924
- Preceded by: Hugh Morrison
- Succeeded by: Hugh Morrison

Personal details
- Born: 1 April 1876 Kensington, Middlesex, England
- Died: 4 January 1962 (aged 85)
- Party: Liberal
- Spouse(s): Isabel Tredwell Boydell Houghton (m. 1902; died 1933) Marie Josephine (m. 1936)
- Parents: John Fletcher Moulton (father); Clara Hertz (mother)
- Military career
- Allegiance: United Kingdom
- Branch: British Army
- Service years: 1914-18
- Rank: Lieutenant
- Unit: Royal Artillery
- Conflicts: World War I
- Awards: Military Cross

Hugh Lawrence Fletcher Moulton MC (1 April 1876 – 4 January 1962) was a British Liberal politician.

The son of John Fletcher Moulton, Baron Moulton, he was a barrister by profession. At the 1923 general election, he was elected as Member of Parliament (MP) for Salisbury in Wiltshire, but was defeated at the 1924 election. He did not stand for Parliament again.

Parliament of the United Kingdom
Preceded by Hugh Morrison	Member of Parliament for Salisbury; 1923–1924	Succeeded by Hugh Morrison
