= 1942 Salisbury by-election =

1942 UK parliamentary by-election

The 1942 Salisbury by-election was a by-election held for the British House of Commons constituency of Salisbury in Wiltshire on 8 July 1942. It was won by the Conservative Party candidate John Morrison, later Baron Margadale.

== Vacancy ==
The seat had become vacant on the death of the 55-year-old sitting Conservative Member of Parliament (MP) James Despencer-Robertson. He had won the seat at a by-election in 1931, having previously been MP for Islington West from 1922 to 1923.

== Candidates ==
The Conservative candidate was 36-year-old John Morrison.

During World War II, most by-elections were unopposed, since the major parties had agreed not to contest by-elections when vacancies arose in seats held by the other parties; contests occurred only when independent candidates or minor parties chose to stand, and the Common Wealth Party was formed with the specific aim of contesting war-time by-elections.

In Salisbury, there were two independent candidates: William Reginald Hipwell, editor of Reveille, a " barrack room newspaper for the fighting forces", stood as an Independent Progressive and J. D. Monro as an "Independent Democrat".

== Result ==
On a greatly reduced turnout, Morrison held the seat for the Conservatives, with more than two-thirds of the votes and a majority of 8,858. He held the seat until his elevation to the peerage in 1965.

== Votes ==
Salisbury by-election, July 1942
Party	Candidate	Votes	%	±%
Conservative	John Morrison	12,076	67.8	−3.7
Independent Progressive	William Reginald Hipwell	3,218	18.1	New
Independent Democrat	J. D. Monro	2,519	14.1	New
Majority		8,858	49.7	+6.7
Turnout		17,813	39.7	−26.5
Conservative hold		Swing		

== Previous election ==
General election May 1935: Salisbury
Party	Candidate	Votes	%	±%
Conservative	James Despencer-Robertson	20,707	71.5	−5.4
Labour	E. J. Plaisted	8,259	28.5	+5.4
Majority		12,448	43.0	−10.8
Turnout		28,966	66.2	−5.7
Conservative hold		Swing	−5.4	

== See also ==
- Salisbury (UK Parliament constituency)
- Salisbury
- 1931 Salisbury by-election
- 1965 Salisbury by-election
- List of United Kingdom by-elections
