= Robert Key (politician) =

British politician (1945–2023)

- Official portrait, 2005

Minister for Sport
- In office 10 April 1992 – 27 May 1993
- Prime Minister: John Major
- Preceded by: Robert Atkins
- Succeeded by: Iain Sproat

Member of Parliament for Salisbury
- In office 9 June 1983 – 12 April 2010
- Preceded by: Michael Hamilton
- Succeeded by: John Glen

Personal details
- Born: Simon Robert Key; 22 April 1945 Plymouth, Devon, England
- Died: 3 February 2023 (aged 77) Wiltshire, England
- Party: Conservative
- Spouse: Susan Irvine (m. 1968)
- Children: 4
- Parent: Maurice Key (father)
- Education: Clare College, Cambridge

Simon Robert Key (22 April 1945 – 3 February 2023) was a British Conservative politician who served as Member of Parliament (MP) for Salisbury from 1983 to 2010. He was also a former teacher and served as Chair of Governors at Salisbury Cathedral School.

== Early life ==
Key was born in Plymouth, the son of Maurice Key, afterwards Bishop of Truro. At the age of 10, he was part of a school walk on Swanage Beach in Dorset where he and six friends discovered an old wartime mine which detonated; only Key and one other boy survived.

He attended Salisbury Cathedral School, then independent Sherborne School. He studied economics at Clare College, Cambridge, receiving an MA and CertEd.

He taught at Loretto School in Musselburgh from 1967 to 1969, then taught economics at Harrow School from 1969 to 1983.

== Political career ==
Robert Key contested the Holborn and St Pancras South seat in 1979.

At the age of 38, he became the Member of Parliament for Salisbury in 1983, upon the retirement of Conservative Michael Hamilton. He was returned as the MP for Salisbury in 1987, 1992, 1997, 2001 and 2005 until his own retirement in 2010.

Between 1983 and 1984, Key was the Parliamentary Private Secretary to former prime minister Edward Heath, who himself retired to Salisbury. According to the Sir Edward Heath Charitable Foundation, it was Key who suggested that Heath look at a house in Salisbury – Arundells – when it came onto the market in 1985. Heath bought the house and lived there until his death in 2005.

Key became the Minister for Local Government and Inner Cities in the Department of the Environment (now DEFRA) in 1990, serving until 1992, and setting up the Inner Cities Religious Council in 1991.

He was the Minister for Sport at the Department of National Heritage (now Culture, Media and Sport) from 1992 to 1993 and then was Minister for Roads and Traffic from 1993 to 1994 during the tenure of John Major.

In opposition, Key served as a front-bench spokesman during the leaderships of William Hague and Iain Duncan Smith. In 2001, he was the shadow minister for Science and Energy, and in July 2002, he was appointed as the shadow minister for International Development. He stood down from this position in June 2003, returning to the backbenches but retaining his membership of the Defence Select Committee.

On 2 December 2009, Key announced his decision to stand down at the next general election.

== Personal life ==
Robert Key was the son of Maurice Key, who was the 10th Bishop of Truro from 1960 to 1973, as well as the Bishop of Sherborne from 1947 until 1960.

Key married Susan Irvine in 1968 in Perth. They had two sons (one of whom died in infancy) and two daughters and lived in Harnham. He was a committed choral singer and member of the General Synod of the Church of England.

Key died in Wiltshire on 3 February 2023, at the age of 77.

Parliament of the United Kingdom
Preceded by Michael Hamilton	Member of Parliament for Salisbury; 1983–2010	Succeeded by John Glen
Political offices
Preceded by Robert Atkins	Minister for Sport; 1992–1993	Succeeded by Iain Sproat
