= 1965 Salisbury by-election =

1965 UK parliamentary by-election

The 1965 Salisbury by-election was a by-election held for the British House of Commons constituency of Salisbury in Wiltshire on 4 February 1965. It was won by the Conservative Party candidate Michael Hamilton.

== Vacancy ==
The seat had become vacant when the 58-year-old sitting Conservative Member of Parliament (MP) John Morrison had been ennobled as Baron Margadale. He had won the seat at a by-election in 1942.

== Candidates ==
The Conservative candidate was 46-year-old Michael Hamilton.

The Labour Party selected the National Union of Bank Employees official Leif Mills, and the Liberal Party fielded Hugh Capstick; both had contested the seat at the general election in October 1964. Maj. Horace Trevor-Cox, a former Conservative MP, stood as Independent Conservative candidate.

== Result ==
Michael Hamilton of the Conservative Party returned to the House of Commons as an MP after he lost his Wellingborough seat in the General election in 1964.

== Votes ==
Salisbury by-election, February 1965
Party	Candidate	Votes	%	±%
Conservative	Michael Hamilton	17,599	48.2	−0.1
Labour	Leif Mills	13,660	37.4	+3.0
Liberal	Hugh Capstick	4,699	12.9	−4.4
Ind. Conservative	Horace Trevor-Cox	533	1.5	New
Majority		3,939	10.8	−3.1
Turnout		36,491		
Conservative hold		Swing		

General election October 1964: Salisbury
Party	Candidate	Votes	%	±%
Conservative	John Morrison	20,071	48.3	−4.5
Labour	Leif A Mills	14,311	34.4	+1.3
Liberal	Hugh Capstick	7,176	17.3	+3.2
Majority		5,760	13.9	−5.8
Turnout		41,558	78.6	+0.4
Conservative hold		Swing		

== See also ==
- Salisbury (UK Parliament constituency)
- Salisbury
- 1931 Salisbury by-election
- 1942 Salisbury by-election
- List of United Kingdom by-elections
