= Ascot Rotary Club Festive Handicap Hurdle =

Hurdle horse race in Britain

Ladbroke
2025
Wilful	Hot Fuss	Alexei

Previous years
2024
Fiercely Proud	Kabral Du Mathan	Be Aware
2023
Luccia	Impose Toi	Altobelli
2021
Tritonic	Onemorefortheroad	Garry Clermont

2020-2011
2020
Not So Sleepy	Buzz	Lightly Squeeze
2019
Not So Sleepy	Monsieur Lecoq	Sir Valentine
2018
Mohaayed	Lisp	Western Ryder
2017
Hunters Call	Silver Streak	Verdana Blue
2016
Brain Power	Consul De Thaix	Fergall
2015
Jolly's Cracked It	Sternrubin	Renneti
2014
Bayan	Pine Creek	Activial
2013
Willow's Saviour	Ptit Zig	Flaxen Flare
2012
Cause of Causes	Petit Robin	Dan Breen
2011
Raya Star	Rigidity	Alarazi

2010-2001
2008
Sentry Duty	Belcantista	Songe
2007
Jack The Giant	Alsadaa	King's Revenge
2006
Acambo	Tarlac	Victram
2003
Thesis	Sud Bleu	Saintsaire
2002
Chauvinist	Idaho d'Ox	Benbyas
2001
Marble Arch	Fait Le Jojo	Tikram

The Ascot Rotary Club Festive Handicap Hurdle , is a Premier Handicap National Hunt hurdle race in Great Britain which is open to horses aged four years or older. It is run at Ascot over a distance of about 1 mile and 7½ furlongs (1 mile 7 furlongs and 152 yards, or 3,156 metres). It is a handicap race, and it is scheduled to take place each year in December.

The race was first run in Great Britain in 2001 having been staged as The Ladbroke Handicap Hurdle in January at Leopardstown in Ireland prior to that. The Irish race continued under different sponsored titles and is now run as the Liffey Handicap Hurdle. The Ascot race was awarded Grade 3 status in 2013. It continued to be run as the Ladbroke Handicap Hurdle until 2015, and the 2016 running was titled the Wessex Youth Trust Handicap Hurdle. In 2017 the race title promoted the Racing Welfare charity, and from 2018 to 2023 the race was sponsored by Betfair. Ladbrokes returned as sponsor in 2024, and the race took its present title in 2025.

== Winners ==
Year	Winner	Age	Weight	Jockey	Trainer
2001	Marble Arch	5	10-11	Norman Williamson	Hughie Morrison
2002	Chauvinist	7	10-00	Norman Williamson	Nicky Henderson
2003	Thesis	5	11-02	Brian Crowley	Venetia Williams
2005 (Jan) (Note: The race was run at Sandown Park in January in the 2004-05 and 2005-06 seasons due to the closure of Ascot Racecourse for redevelopment)	Tamarinbleu	5	10-11	Tony McCoy	Martin Pipe
2006 (Jan)	Desert Air	7	10-09	Tom Scudamore	Martin Pipe
2006 (Dec)	Acambo	5	11-09	Timmy Murphy	David Pipe
2007	Jack The Giant	5	11-00	Mick Fitzgerald	Nicky Henderson
2008	Sentry Duty	6	11-09	Barry Geraghty	Nicky Henderson
2009	Abandoned due to snow
2010	Abandoned due to snow
2011	Raya Star	5	10-01	Wayne Hutchinson	Alan King
2012	Cause of Causes	4	10-13	Davy Condon	Gordon Elliott
2013	Willow's Saviour	6	10-05	Harry Skelton	Dan Skelton
2014	Bayan	5	11-05	Davy Condon	Gordon Elliott
2015 (Note: The 2015 renewal had a dead heat finish)	Sternrubin	4	10-10	Richard Johnson	Philip Hobbs
2015	Jolly's Cracked It	6	11-03	Noel Fehily	Harry Fry
2016	Brain Power	5	11-11	David Mullins	Nicky Henderson
2017	Hunters Call	7	10-03	Jack Kennedy	Olly Murphy
2018	Mohaayed	6	11-10	Harry Skelton	Dan Skelton
2019	Not So Sleepy	7	10-03	Jonathan Burke	Hughie Morrison
2020	Not So Sleepy	8	11-06	Tom O'Brien	Hughie Morrison
2021	Tritonic	4	11-00	Adrian Heskin	Alan King
2022	Abandoned due to frost
2023	Luccia	5	11-08	Paul O'Brien	Nicky Henderson
2024	Fiercely Proud	5	10-13	Kielan Woods	Ben Pauling
2025	Wilful	6	11-02	Jonjo O'Neill Jr	Jonjo & AJ O'Neill

== See also ==
- Horse racing in Great Britain
- List of British National Hunt races
