= Hughie Morrison =

British racehorse trainer (born 1960)

The Honourable Hughie Morrison
- Born: 7 November 1960 (age 65)
- Education: Eton College
- Occupation: Racehorse trainer
- Spouse: Jane Jenks (m. 1986)
- Children: 2
- Parents: James Morrison (father); Clare Barclay (mother)
- Relatives: John Morrison (grandfather)

Hugh "Hughie" Morrison (born 7 November 1960) is a British racehorse trainer who specialises in training horses competing in Flat racing.

== Early life and education ==
Morrison is the younger son of James Morrison, 2nd Baron Margadale and his wife Clare Barclay. His elder brother is Alastair Morrison, 3rd Baron Margadale.

He was educated at Eton.

== Career ==
Morrison was advised by the trainer Henry Cecil to see life outside racing before training and initially worked in the pharmaceutical industry and ran a lighting company in Manchester.

He began training horses in 1997 having bought stables at East Ilsley the previous September, after a two-year period as assistant trainer to Paul Cole. His first major success came in National Hunt racing but he has subsequently concentrated on Flat racing.

In February 2022, Morrison trained his 1000th winner.

== Major wins ==
(United Kingdom) Great Britain

- July Cup - (2) - Pastoral Pursuits (2005), Sakhee's Secret (2007)
- Goodwood Cup - (1) - Quickthorn (2023)
- Fighting Fifth Hurdle - (2) - Not So Sleepy (dead heat 2021, 2023)

France

- Prix Royal-Oak - (1) Alcazar (2005)
