= Fonthill Gifford =

Village in Wiltshire, England

Coordinates: 51.087°N 2.109°W

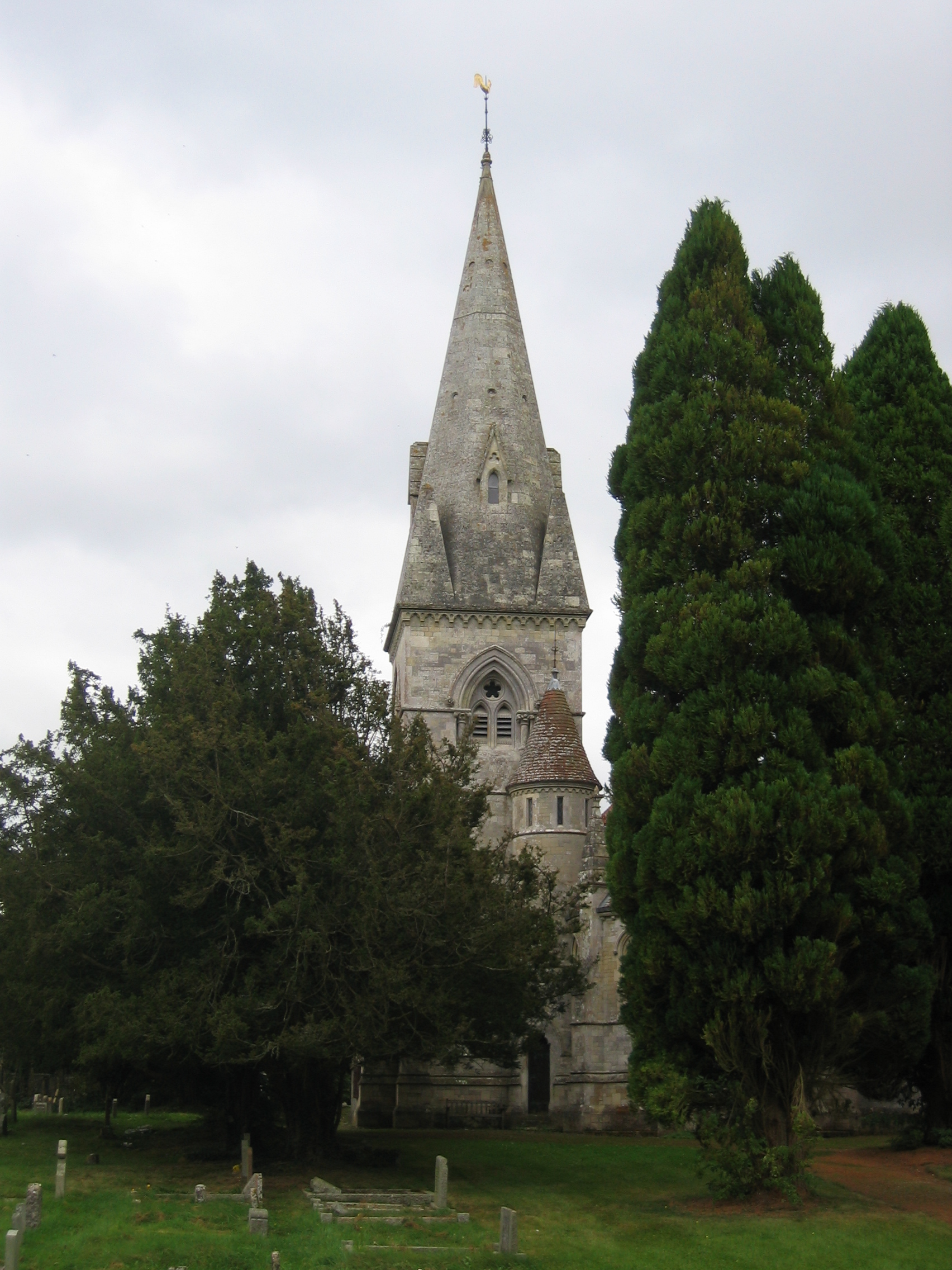
- Holy Trinity parish church

- Location within Wiltshire
- Population: 102 (in 2011)
- OS grid reference: ST925320
- Civil parish: Fonthill Gifford
- Unitary authority: Wiltshire
- Ceremonial county: Wiltshire
- Region: South West
- Country: England
- Sovereign state: United Kingdom
- Post town: Salisbury
- Postcode district: SP3
- Dialling code: 01747
- Police: Wiltshire
- Fire: Dorset and Wiltshire
- Ambulance: South Western
- UK Parliament: Salisbury
- Website: Parish Council

Fonthill Gifford is a village and civil parish in Wiltshire, England, to the north of the Nadder valley, 14 miles (23 km) west of Salisbury.

== History ==
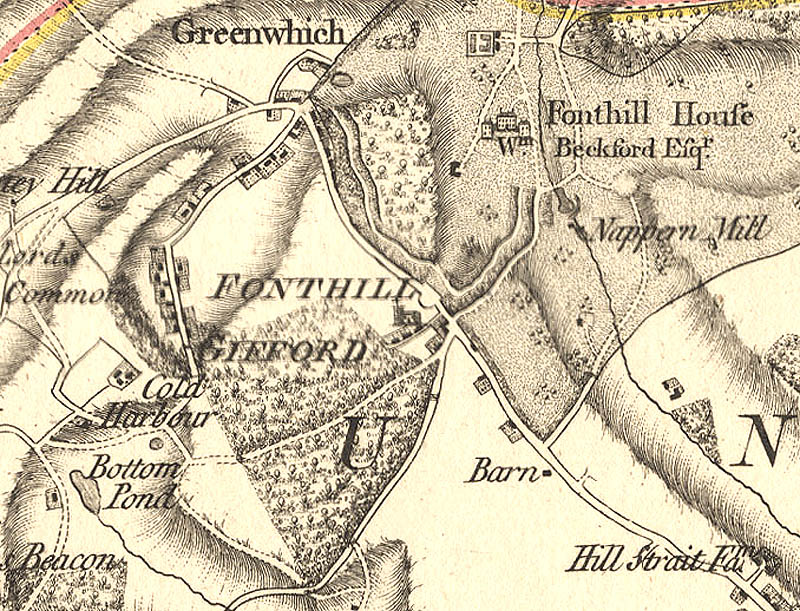
Detail from Andrews’ and Dury's Map of Wiltshire, 1773

The name of the village and parish derives from the Giffard family, landowners, beginning with Berenger Giffard who was lord in 1086. The Marvyn family were lords of the manor from the fifteenth to the seventeenth century. Among them were Sir John Marvyn (c.1503–1566), MP and High Sheriff, who purchased the adjoining Compton Bassett manor; and his son James (1529–1611), also MP.

Fonthill then passed by marriage to George Tuchet, later Earl of Castlehaven. His son Mervyn was executed in 1631, and in the next year the estate was granted by the king to Baron Cottington, ambassador and Chancellor of the Exchequer. Among his descendants was Francis Cottington, who lived at Fonthill Park. Apart from an interruption during the Civil War the estate continued with the Cottingtons until sold to William Beckford, future Lord Mayor of London, in 1745. His son, also William, built the grandiose Fonthill Abbey but was obliged to sell the estate in 1823, after which it was broken up.

The parish had 70 taxpayers in 1377. From the 16th century until the 20th, most of the population were employed by the parish's wealthy households; 493 were recorded at the 1801 census, and numbers declined since then, reaching a new low of 102 in 2011.

=== 20th century ===
In 1944, the 55th Armored Infantry Battalion of 11th Armored Division of the United States Army trained for two months on Salisbury Plain and was encamped at Fonthill New Abbey and in Fonthill Park. In 2004 a plaque was added to the war memorial at Tisbury in their memory.

In 1952, John Morrison (later Baron Margadale) began to breed racehorses at 19th-century stables to the east of the village. His son James, 2nd Baron took over the Fonthill Stud in 1972, and breeding continues under Alastair, 3rd Baron. The stud has produced winners of several major races: the Nassau Stakes (Spree, 1963); the Oaks (Juliette Marny, 1975 and Scintillate, 1979); and the St Leger (Julio Mariner, 1978).

== Geography ==
Most dwellings, and the parish church, are along or near the minor road between Tisbury and Hindon. Greenwich hamlet lies north of the village. Woodland known as Fonthill Abbey Wood covers much of the south of the parish.

== Churches ==
The Church of England parish church of Holy Trinity was built in 1864–66 to designs by the Gothic Revival architect T.H. Wyatt and is Grade II* listed. Pevsner wrote that the church: "groups extremely picturesquely from the E, with its NE tower with a spire rising between pyramid pinnacles, an apse, and a round turret to its N." Today the church is part of the Nadder Valley Team Ministry.

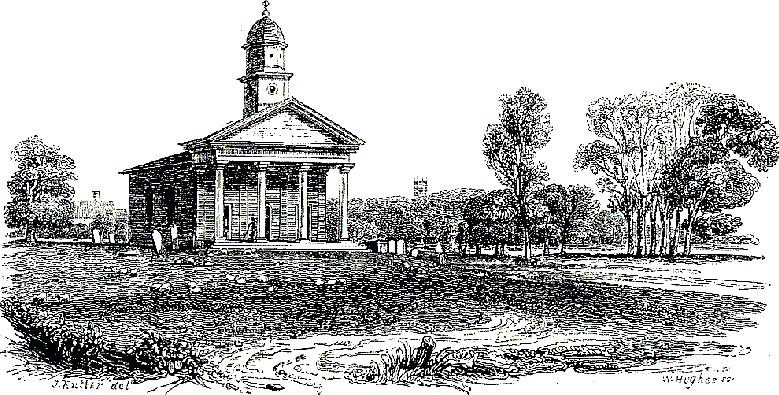
The 18th-century church

Wyatt's church replaced a neoclassical church built in 1747–49 for Alderman Beckford, near the parish boundary where the Hindon – Tisbury and Fonthill Bishop – Semley roads cross. This in turn was a replacement for an older church, said in 1566 to have been dedicated to St Nicholas, that stood near the stream in the north-east quarter of the parish, close to the now-demolished Fonthill House.

== Houses on the Fonthill estate ==
An early house was damaged by fire in 1624 or 1625 and was bought by Lord Cottington in 1632, who by 1637 had finished restoring it, and may have used the services of Inigo Jones.

Around 1715, Cottington put a classical façade on the house and removed the formal gardens. Between 1745 and 1753 William Beckford re-aligned the estate, making the main entrances to the north and the south. He added a five-arched bridge over the lake, placed a folly on the high ground to the west of the house and demolished the old parish church.

Fonthill House burnt down in 1755 and was replaced with a new one, Fonthill Splendens, built for Beckford to the south of the old one. The design of the house was initially based on Houghton Hall in Norfork. Those involved in the rebuilding project included Robert Adam, Sir John Soane and James Wyatt, Andrea Casali, J. F. Moon, Thomas Banks, and John Bacon the elder. An archway with two lodges, built c. 1756, spans the estate's northern entrance road. This house was inherited in 1770 by Beckford's son, William Thomas Beckford, who extended the lake and built grottoes on the lakeside.

In the 1790s Beckford began to build Fonthill Abbey, on high ground a mile to the southwest, and he had parts of the house demolished to provide building material. The west portion of the house survived, becoming known as The Pavilion, and was bought around 1829 by James Morrison, the millionaire draper and railway investor, who renamed it as Fonthill House.

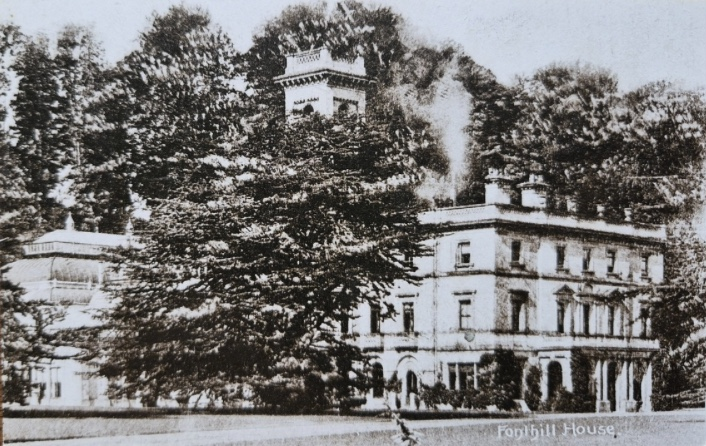
The Fonthill House demolished in 1921

Morrison’s second son, Alfred, added one storey and an Italianate tower. The house was demolished in 1921 except for the west service wing which was converted into cottages that were demolished in 1975.

In 1904 a new house was designed by Detmar Blow for Hugh Morrison on land to the east in the parish of Chilmark; at first known as Little Ridge, it was enlarged in 1921 and became known as Fonthill House. In 1972 it was replaced by a smaller house, still the seat of the Morrison family. As of 2013 the estate amounted to 9,000 acres (3,600 ha).

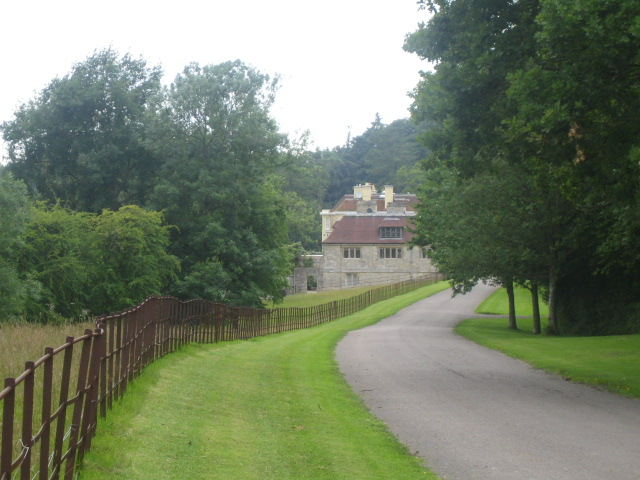
Fonthill House in 2007

== Fonthill Abbey ==
Fonthill Abbey was an enormous mansion southwest of the village, in the style of a medieval abbey. Built by William Beckford between 1796 and 1813, the rest of the building was damaged by the collapse of the main tower in 1825, and almost wholly demolished by 1845; a habitable fragment remains. The site is marked on maps as Old Fonthill Abbey.

The western part of Beckford's estate was later acquired by the 2nd Marquess of Westminster, who had a new Fonthill Abbey built in 1846-52 (Pevsner) or 1856-59 (VCH), some 500 metres southeast of the site of Beckford's abbey. This mansion, designed by William Burn in Scottish Baronial style, was demolished in 1955.

== Local government ==
The civil parish elects a parish council. It is in the area of Wiltshire Council unitary authority, which is responsible for all significant local government functions.

In 1934 the northwest portion of the parish, about one-fifth of its area, was transferred to Hindon parish.

== Sources ==
- Pevsner, Nikolaus; Cherry, Bridget (revision) (1975) [1963]. Wiltshire. The Buildings of England. Harmondsworth: Penguin Books. pp. 246–249. ISBN 0-14-071026-4.
