= Baron Margadale =

British barony

Baron Margadale, of Islay in the County of Argyll, is a title in the Peerage of the United Kingdom. It was created on 1 January 1965 for the Conservative politician John Morrison. As of 2017, the title is held by his grandson, the third baron, who succeeded his father in 2003.

The barony of Margadale is the most recent extant non-royal hereditary barony. Lord Margadale is the most junior of Britain's hereditary peers. The barony is named after the area of Margadale, in Islay.

James Morrison, great-grandfather of the first Baron, was a Hampshire innkeeper's son who became the greatest textile wholesaler in England and a prominent merchant banker. He left circa £4 million in 1857, the second largest non-landed fortune in Britain up to that time after Nathan Mayer Rothschild's £5 million. James's son Charles Morrison continued in the same lines of business, and left £10.9 million in 1909, which was the largest British estate for probate purposes up to that time. He was probably the second richest man in Britain at his death, after the Duke of Westminster. Charles Morrison's nephew Hugh Morrison was the father of the first Baron Margadale. James Morrison, uncle of the first Baron, was a politician. Sir Charles Morrison and Sir Peter Morrison, younger sons of the first Baron, were both Conservative politicians.

The family seat is Fonthill House, near Fonthill Bishop, Wiltshire.

== Barons Margadale (1965) ==
- John Granville Morrison, 1st Baron Margadale (1906–1996)
- James Ian Morrison, 2nd Baron Margadale (1930–2003)
- Alastair John Morrison, 3rd Baron Margadale (born 1958)

The heir apparent is the present holder's son, the Hon. Declan James Morrison (born 1993).

== Line of succession ==
- Major John Granville Morrison, 1st Baron Margadale (1906–1996)
  - James Ian Morrison, 2nd Baron Margadale (1930–2003)
    - Alastair John Morrison, 3rd Baron Margadale (born 1958)
      - (1) Hon. Declan James Morrison (born 1993)
    - (2) Hon. Hugh Morrison (born 1960)
      - (3) Geordie Anthony Morrison (born 1989)
  - Hon. Sir Charles Andrew Morrison (1932–2005)
    - (4) David John Morrison (born 1959)
      - (5) Ivo Charles David Morrison (born 1990)

== Arms ==
Coat of arms of Baron Margadale
Crest Three Saracens' heads conjoined in one neck one looking to the dexter one affrontée and one looking to the sinister all Proper Escutcheon Tierced in pairle Azure Sable and Gules in chief a Saracen's head couped affrontée and in base two Saracens' heads addorsed in profile all Argent and at the fess point an inescutcheon parted per pale dexter per bend sinister embattled Gules and Or in dexter chief a battleaxe paleways Argent and in sinister base issuant from a base undy Azure and Argent a tower Sable masoned Argent port Gules (Morrison of Islay) sinister Vert powdered with bezants a horse rearing on its hind legs Argent langued and hoofed Gules (Lordship of Margadale) Supporters On either side a woodcock Proper Motto Praetio Prudentia Praestat (Prudence Before Any Thought Of A Reward) Badge Through an annulet Argent a sword in pale point upwards Proper
