= John Morrison, 1st Baron Margadale =

British landowner and Conservative Party politician

Major The Right Honourable The Lord Margadale TD DL

Member of Parliament for Salisbury
- In office 18 July 1942 – 1 January 1965
- Preceded by: James Despencer-Robertson
- Succeeded by: Michael Hamilton

Personal details
- Born: John Granville Morrison; 16 December 1906
- Died: 25 May 1996 (aged 89)
- Party: Conservative

John Granville Morrison, 1st Baron Margadale, TD, DL (16 December 1906 – 25 May 1996) was a British landowner and Conservative Party politician. An MP from 1942 to 1965, he notably served as Chairman of the 1922 Committee between 1955 and 1964. He was the last non-royal person to receive a hereditary barony.

== Background ==
Morrison was the son of Hugh Morrison and Lady Mary Leveson-Gower, daughter of the Liberal statesman Granville Leveson-Gower, 2nd Earl Granville. James Morrison was his great-grandfather. The family seat is the Fonthill estate in southern Wiltshire. Morrison was educated at Eton College and Magdalene College, Cambridge and served in the Royal Wiltshire Yeomanry in the Second World War, until recalled in order to stand for election to Parliament.

== Political career ==
Morrison was appointed High Sheriff of Wiltshire for 1938. In 1942 he was elected Member of Parliament for Salisbury, a seat he held until 1965, and served as Chairman of the 1922 Committee between 1955 and 1964. On 1 January 1965 he was raised to the peerage as Baron Margadale, of Islay in the County of Argyll, in recognition of his "political and public services". He was also Lord Lieutenant of Wiltshire between 1969 and 1981. In January 1983, he was appointed a Deputy Lieutenant for Wiltshire, together with Mary Salisbury.

He was the last commoner to be raised to the hereditary peerage until Margaret Thatcher's brief revival of the practice in 1983, and the last under a Labour government.

== Other interests ==
Jockey colours for Lord Margadale

Morrison began owning and breeding horses in 1952, and established the Fonthill Stud in 19th-century stables on his estate, which has produced winners of several classic races. He also led a reorganisation of the Jockey Club.

From 1967 to 1975, he was President of the Wiltshire Historic Buildings Trust.

== Family ==
Lord Margadale married the Honourable Margaret Smith, daughter of William Smith, 2nd Viscount Hambleden and Lady Esther Gore, on 16 October 1928. They had one daughter and three sons, the two younger of whom became Conservative politicians:

- James Morrison, 2nd Baron Margadale (17 July 1930 – 6 April 2003).
- Hon. Sir Charles Andrew Morrison (25 June 1932 – 9 May 2005).
- Hon. Dame Mary Anne Morrison, GCVO (b. 17 May 1937), Woman of the Bedchamber to HM Queen Elizabeth II from 1960.
- Rt. Hon. Sir Peter Morrison (2 June 1944 – 13 July 1995).

Lady Margadale died in 1980. Lord Margadale was succeeded in the barony by his eldest son, James.

== Arms ==
Coat of arms of John Morrison, 1st Baron Margadale
Crest Three Saracens' heads conjoined in one neck one looking to the dexter one affrontée and one looking to the sinister all Proper Escutcheon Tierced in pairle Azure Sable and Gules in chief a Saracen's head couped affrontée and in base two Saracens' heads addorsed in profile all Argent and at the fess point an inescutcheon parted per pale dexter per bend sinister embattled Gules and Or in dexter chief a battleaxe paleways Argent and in sinister base issuant from a base undy Azure and Argent a tower Sable masoned Argent port Gules (Morrison of Islay) sinister Vert powdered with bezants a horse rearing on its hind legs Argent langued and hoofed Gules (Lordship of Margadale) Supporters On either side a woodcock Proper Motto Praetio Prudentia Praestat (Prudence Before Any Thought Of A Reward) Badge Through an annulet Argent a sword in pale point upwards Proper

Parliament of the United Kingdom
Preceded by James Despencer-Robertson	Member of Parliament for Salisbury; 1942–1965	Succeeded by Michael Hamilton
Party political offices
Preceded by Derek Walker-Smith	Chairman of the 1922 Committee; 1955–1964	Succeeded by Sir William Anstruther-Gray, Bt
Honorary titles
Preceded by The Earl of Pembroke	Lord Lieutenant of Wiltshire; 1969–1981	Succeeded by Hugh Trefusis Brassey
Peerage of the United Kingdom
New creation	Baron Margadale; 1965–1996	Succeeded by James Morrison
