= Hugh Morrison (English politician) =

British politician (1868–1931)

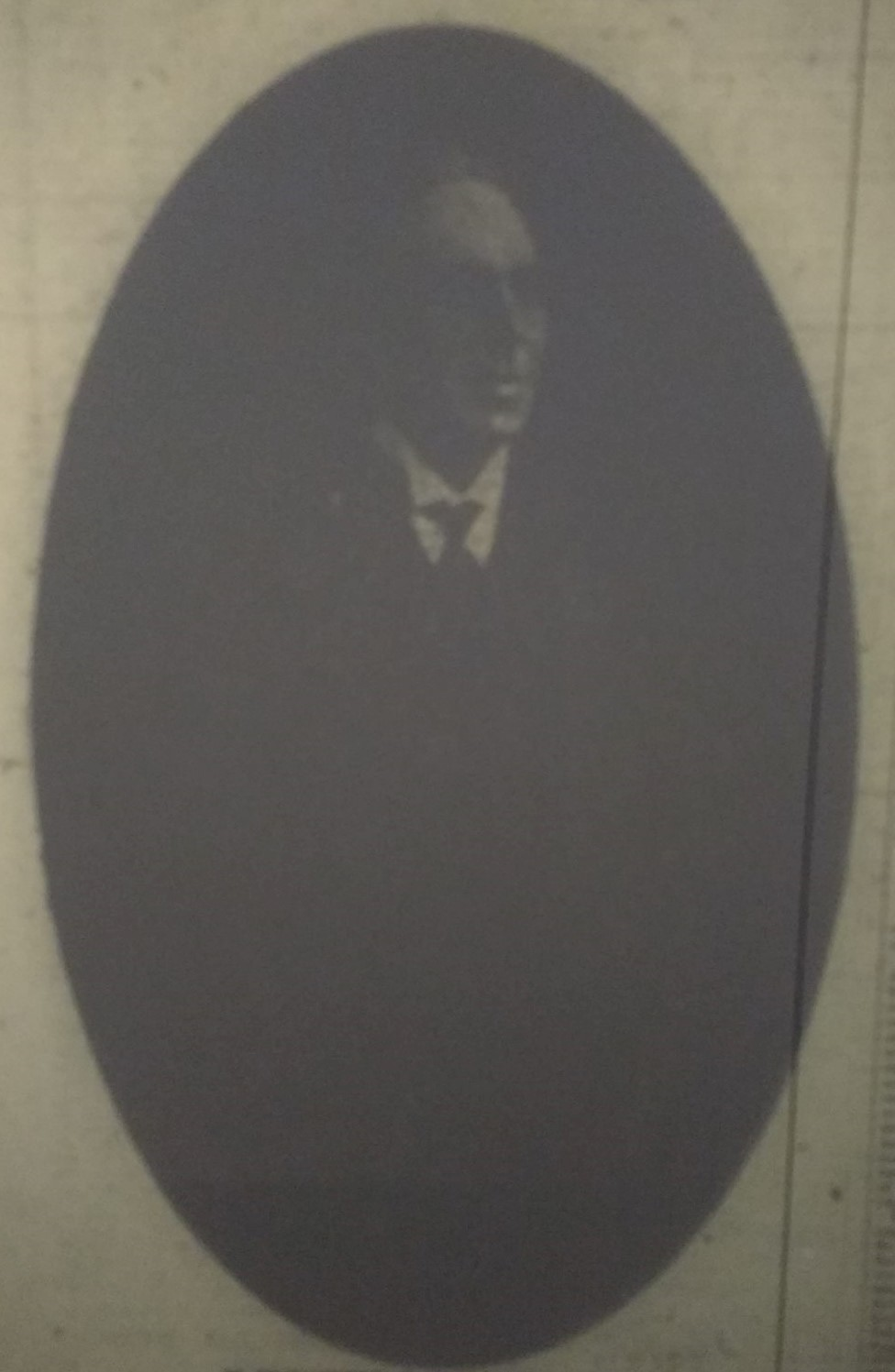
- Hugh Morrison, taken from a December 1918 issue of the Salisbury Journal

Sheriff of Wiltshire
- In office 1904–1904
- Preceded by: George Palmer
- Succeeded by: Sir Audley Dallas Neeld

Member of Parliament for Wilton
- In office 1918–1918
- Preceded by: Sir Charles Bathurst
- Succeeded by: Constituency abolished

Member of Parliament for Salisbury
- In office 1918–1923
- Preceded by: Godfrey Locker-Lampson
- Succeeded by: Hugh Moulton

Member of Parliament for Salisbury
- In office 1924–1931
- Preceded by: Hugh Moulton
- Succeeded by: James Despencer-Robertson

Personal details
- Born: 8 June 1868 Wiltshire, England
- Died: 15 March 1931 (aged 62) London, England
- Party: Conservative
- Spouse: Lady Mary Leveson-Gower (m. 1892)
- Parents: Alfred Morrison (father); Mabel Chermside (mother)
- Relatives: James Morrison (paternal grandfather); John Morrison (son); James Morrison (brother)
- Education: Eton College
- Alma mater: Trinity College, Cambridge

Hugh Morrison (8 June 1868 – 15 March 1931) was a British Conservative Party politician.

The son of Alfred Morrison and Mabel née Chermside of Fonthill in Wiltshire, and grandson of millionaire businessman James Morrison, he was educated at Eton and Trinity College, Cambridge. In 1892 he married Lady Mary Leveson-Gower, daughter of Liberal statesman Granville Leveson-Gower, 2nd Earl Granville. The couple had two children, including John Morrison, who was elevated to the peerage as Baron Margadale in 1965. Hugh and his brother, Major James Morrison, became two of the wealthiest men in the United Kingdom, having inherited their grandfather's fortune. As well as Fonthill, he owned much of the Isle of Islay. In 1904 he served as Sheriff of Wiltshire, and was also appointed a Deputy Lieutenant of Argyllshire.

He was elected as Member of Parliament for Wilton at a by-election in November 1918, holding the seat for a few weeks until it was abolished for the 1918 general election. He was then elected as MP for Salisbury, holding that seat until his narrow defeat at the 1923 general election by the Liberal Party candidate Hugh Moulton. He regained the seat from Moulton in 1924, and was re-elected in 1929. In his final years in parliament he was in ill health, and he resigned from the House of Commons in 1931. He died soon afterwards at his London town house, aged 62.

Parliament of the United Kingdom
Preceded by Sir Charles Bathurst	Member of Parliament for Wilton; 1918–1918	Constituency abolished
Preceded by Godfrey Locker-Lampson	Member of Parliament for Salisbury; 1918–1923	Succeeded by Hugh Moulton
Preceded by Hugh Moulton	Member of Parliament for Salisbury; 1924–1931	Succeeded by James Despencer-Robertson
