= 1931 Salisbury by-election =

UK parliamentary by-election

The 1931 Salisbury by-election was a by-election held for the British House of Commons constituency of Salisbury in Wiltshire on 11 March 1931. The seat had become vacant on the resignation of the sitting Conservative Member of Parliament Hugh Morrison, and the by-election was won by the Conservative candidate James Despencer-Robertson.

== Vacancy ==
The outgoing Conservative member Hugh Morrison had first won the seat at the 1918 general election and had held it until 1923 before regaining it the following year. He resigned his seat on 16 February 1931, and died on 15 March 1931, aged 62.

== Candidates ==
The Conservative candidate was 44-year-old James Despencer-Robertson, who had previously been the member for Islington West, serving from the 1922 general election until his defeat at the 1923 general election.

The Liberal Party candidate was Lucy Masterman, who had been the second-placed candidate for Salisbury at the 1929 general election. The Labour Party fielded F. R. Hancock, who had been placed third in 1929.

== Result ==
On a reduced turnout, Despencer-Robertson held the seat for the Conservatives, with a significantly-increased majority of 6,213. He held the seat until his death in 1942.

Masterman did not stand for Parliament again, but Hancock stood again three times, without success: in Lewes at the 1931 and 1935 general elections, and at the 1939 Monmouth by-election.

== Votes ==
General election May 1929: Salisbury
Party	Candidate	Votes	%	±%
Conservative	Hugh Morrison	15,672	47.3	−9.0
Liberal	Lucy Masterman	13,022	39.3	+3.7
Labour	F. R. Hancock	4,435	13.4	+5.3
Majority		2,650	8.0	−12.7
Turnout		33,129	81.9	+0.1
Conservative hold		Swing	-6.4	

Salisbury by-election, March 1931
Party	Candidate	Votes	%	±%
Conservative	James Despencer-Robertson	15,800	53.9	+6.6
Liberal	Lucy Masterman	9,588	32.7	−6.6
Labour	F. R. Hancock	3,939	13.4	0.0
Majority		6,212	21.2	+13.2
Turnout		29,327	71.1	−10.8
Conservative hold		Swing	+6.6	

== See also ==
- Salisbury (UK Parliament constituency)
- Salisbury
- 1942 Salisbury by-election
- 1965 Salisbury by-election
- List of United Kingdom by-elections
