= Salisbury District Council elections =

Local government elections in Wiltshire, England

Salisbury District Council was the local authority for the non-metropolitan district of Salisbury, created in 1974 in Wiltshire, England. It was abolished on 1 April 2009 and replaced by Wiltshire Council.

== Political control ==
From the first election to the council in 1973 until its abolition in 2009, political control of the council was held by the following parties:

Party in control	Years
No overall control	1973–1987
Conservative	1987–1995
Liberal Democrats	1995–1999
No overall control	1999–2003
Conservative	2003–2007
No overall control	2007–2009

=== Leadership ===
The role of mayor was largely ceremonial at Salisbury District Council. Political leadership was instead provided by the leader of the council. The leaders from 2006 until the council's abolition in 2009 were:

Councillor	Party	From	To
Kevin Wren	Conservative		20 Feb 2006
Richard Britton	Conservative	20 Feb 2006	May 2007
Paul Sample	Liberal Democrats	21 May 2007	31 Mar 2009

== Council elections ==
- 1973 Salisbury District Council election
- 1976 Salisbury District Council election (New ward boundaries)
- 1979 Salisbury District Council election
- 1983 Salisbury District Council election
- 1987 Salisbury District Council election
- 1991 Salisbury District Council election (District boundary changes took place but the number of seats remained the same)
- 1995 Salisbury District Council election (District boundary changes took place but the number of seats remained the same)
- 1999 Salisbury District Council election
- 2003 Salisbury District Council election (New ward boundaries)
- 2007 Salisbury District Council election

== District result maps ==
2003 results map

2007 results map

== By-election results ==
=== 2003-2007 ===
Bemerton By-Election 5 May 2005
Party	Candidate	Votes	%	±%
Labour		915	40.9	−27.8
Liberal Democrats		700	31.3	+31.3
Conservative		622	27.8	−3.5
Majority		215	9.6	
Turnout		2,237		
Labour hold		Swing		

Durrington By-Election 5 May 2005
Party	Candidate	Votes	%	±%
Conservative		1,259	47.9	−1.6
Liberal Democrats		941	35.8	−14.7
Labour		429	16.3	+16.3
Majority		318	12.1	
Turnout		2,629		
Conservative hold		Swing		

Downton and Redlynch By-Election 16 November 2006
Party	Candidate	Votes	%	±%
Conservative		907	67.4	+19.4
Independent		311	23.1	+23.1
Labour		127	9.4	−25.9
Majority		596	44.3	
Turnout		1,345		
Conservative hold		Swing		
