= James Despencer-Robertson =

British politician

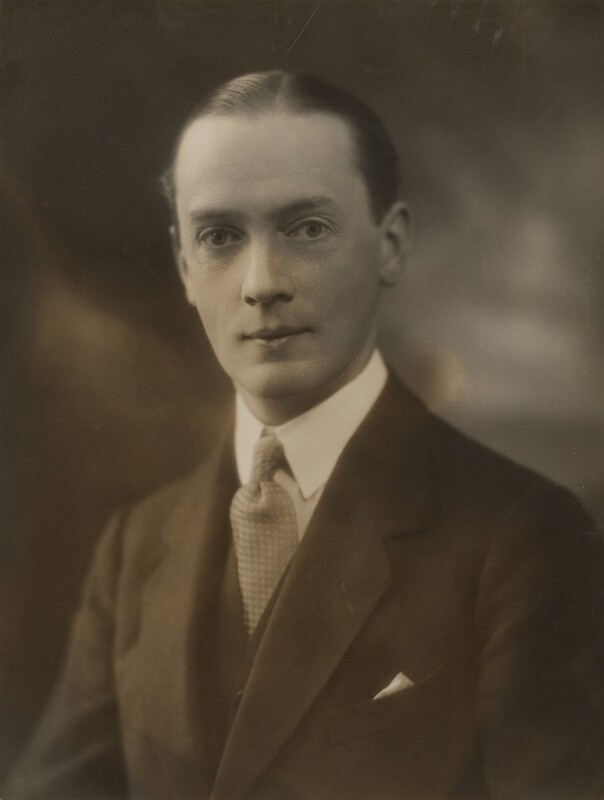
Despencer-Robinson in 1923

James Archibald Saint George Fitzwarenne-Despencer-Robertson, OBE (7 November 1886 – 5 May 1942) was an English Conservative politician.

The only surviving son of Sir Helenus Robert Robertson and his wife Kate Ann Banks, he was born at Upton Grange in Cheshire and educated at Eton College and New College, Oxford. On the outbreak of the First World War in 1914 he was commissioned on the General List. He transferred to the Royal Welch Fusiliers in 1916, ending the war as a brevet major and being appointed an officer of the Order of the British Empire in 1919. Born with the surname Robertson, he assumed the triple-barrelled name Fitzwarenne-Despencer-Robertson on 17 July 1916, in accordance with the wishes of the late Edmund Fitzwarenne-Despencer; however only the latter two of his surnames were regularly used.

At the 1922 general election he was elected as Member of Parliament for the Islington West constituency in London. However his small majority was not sustained at the 1923 election, and was unsuccessful when he contested the seat again in the elections of 1924 and 1929.

In 1931, he was elected as MP for the Salisbury constituency in Wiltshire, at a by-election on 11 March following the resignation of the Conservative MP Hugh Morrison. Despencer-Robertson held this seat until his death. On the outbreak of the Second World War in 1939 he was commissioned on the General List and served until his death as military secretary at Headquarters Southern Command, reaching the rank of lieutenant-colonel. He died in 1942 at the relatively young age of 55, possibly due to a heart attack brought on by overwork.

Parliament of the United Kingdom
Preceded by Sir George Elliott	Member of Parliament for Islington West; 1922–1923	Succeeded by Frederick Montague
Preceded by Hugh Morrison	Member of Parliament for Salisbury; 1931–1942	Succeeded by John Morrison
