= Not So Sleepy =

British-bred Thoroughbred racehorse

- Sire: Beat Hollow
- Grandsire: Sadler's Wells
- Dam: Papillon De Bronze
- Damsire: Marju
- Sex: Gelding
- Foaled: 2012
- Country: Great Britain
- Colour: Chestnut
- Breeder: Lord Blyth
- Owner: Lady Blyth
- Trainer: Hughie Morrison
- Record: 69: 12 - 6 - 6
- Earnings: £607,455

Major wins
- Dee Stakes (2015); Betfair Exchange Trophy Handicap Hurdle (2019, 2020); Fighting Fifth Hurdle (dead heat 2021, 2023)

Not So Sleepy (foaled 18 April 2012) is a retired British Thoroughbred racehorse who competed in National Hunt and flat races. In 2019 and 2020 he won the Grade 3 Betfair Exchange Trophy Handicap Hurdle and in 2021 he tied with Epatante in a dead heat in the Grade 1 Fighting Fifth Hurdle, before winning the race outright in 2023.

== Background ==
Not So Sleepy is a chestnut gelding with a white blaze. His sire, Beat Hollow, won four Group/Grade 1 races in Europe and the United States. His unraced dam, Papillon De Bronze, is a daughter of Marju, winner of the Group 1 St James's Palace Stakes. He was bred by Lord Blyth and remained in ownership of the Blyth family, going into training with Hughie Morrison at East Ilsley in West Berkshire. He is ridden out by his groom Selvaraj Rasiah.

== Racing career ==
Not So Sleepy raced twice as a two-year-old in 2014, winning a maiden stakes at Nottingham on his first racecourse appearance. As a three-year-old, he raced three times in England and three times in France, winning the Dee Stakes and finishing third in the Prix du Prince d'Orange at Longchamp. In 2016 he raced seven times, with his best result being third place in a handicap at Newbury. He achieved his third win in June 2017 in a handicap at Epsom. In 2018 he raced thirteen times without a win, although he finished second in four races and third in two races.

In January 2019, the seven-year-old gelding raced for the first time over hurdles, winning a novice event at Wincanton on his second start. He has been ridden in all his races over jumps by Jonathan Burke. During the summer he returned to the flat without a win. In October he ran in the Cesarewitch Handicap at Newmarket for the first time and came fourth. In November 2019 he won a handicap hurdle at Ascot. He returned to Ascot in December for his next race, the Grade 3 Betfair Exchange Trophy Handicap Hurdle, where he started as joint favourite for only the second time in his career. After leading throughout the race, he won easily by nine lengths.

Not So Sleepy made his first appearance at the Cheltenham Festival in March 2020, where he was pulled up before the last in the Grade 1 Champion Hurdle, which was won by Epatante. In the autumn he won a handicap at Pontefract before achieving another fourth place in the Cesarewitch. Not So Sleepy, who is known for his quirks, then made a disastrous appearance in the Fighting Fifth Hurdle at Newcastle. Ridden by Paddy Brennan for the first time, he jumped off into the lead only to swerve at the first hurdle, unseating his rider. Running loose, he then swerved again at the second and carried out the third favourite Silver Streak. The race was won by favourite Epatante. In December he won the Betfair Exchange Trophy Handicap Hurdle for the second time, on this occasion ridden by Tom O'Brien as his regular jockey, Jonathan Burke, was injured.

The Cheltenham Festival 2021 saw Not So Sleepy start as 125/1 outsider in a field of ten for the Champion Hurdle. He came fifth, thirteen lengths behind the winner, Honeysuckle. In April 2021, he made his only appearance at Aintree, coming seventh in a field of eleven in the Aintree Hurdle.

The highlight of Not So Sleepy's 2021/22 National Hunt season was a dead heat with Epatante in the 2021 Fighting Fifth Hurdle. His 2022 Cheltenham Festival appearance was a repeat of the previous year, starting at 125/1 in the Champion Hurdle and beaten in fifth place by favourite Honeysuckle.

In the autumn of 2022 there was a third place in the Cesarewitch, before Not So Sleepy came third behind Constitution Hill in the Fighting Fifth Hurdle. His appearance at the 2023 Cheltenham Festival again ended in fifth place in the Champion Hurdle, this time starting at odds of 150/1 and finishing 32 lengths behind the favourite, Constitution Hill.

The eleven-year-old began the 2023/24 season with a return to the winner's enclosure for the first time in two years, winning the Autumn Cup Handicap on the flat at Newbury with jockey Oisin Murphy. This was followed by another appearance in the Cesarewitch, when he came seventh in a field of 31. At the beginning of December he was due to run in the Fighting Fifth Hurdle at Newcastle, but the race was postponed due to snow and eventually took place at Sandown Park a week later on 9 December. With the withdrawal of fancied runners Constitution Hill and Shishkin due to the heavy ground, Not So Sleepy started the outsider in a field of four at odds of 9/1. Jockey Sean Bowen kept him tucked in behind the leader, Goshen, until the second last hurdle, when he went clear and kept on to win comfortably by 8 lengths from the mare Love Envoi, becoming the oldest winner of the race in its 54-year history.
