= Fonthill Abbey =

Former country house in Wiltshire, England

Coordinates: 51°4′41.3″N 2°7′5.3″W

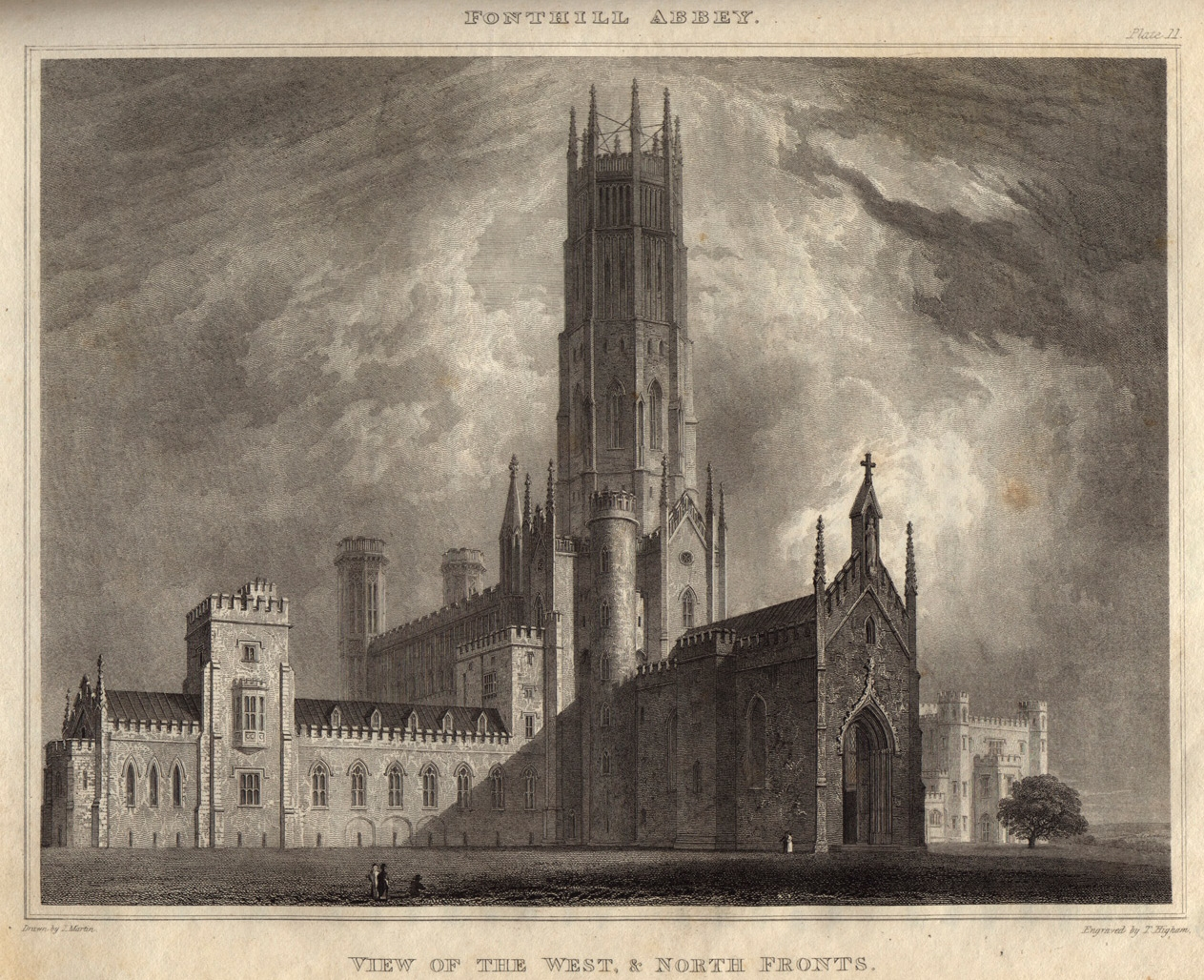
View of the west and north fronts from John Rutter's Delineations of Fonthill (1823)

Fonthill Abbey—also known as Beckford's Folly—was a large Gothic Revival country house built between 1796 and 1813 at Fonthill Gifford in Wiltshire, England, at the direction of William Beckford and architect James Wyatt.

It was built near the site of the Palladian house later known as Fonthill Splendens, which had been constructed by 1770 by Beckford's father William. This, in turn, had replaced the Elizabethan house that Beckford the Elder had purchased in 1744 and which had been destroyed by fire in 1755. The abbey's high tower collapsed several times, lastly in 1825 damaging the western wing, and the building was later almost completely demolished.

== History ==
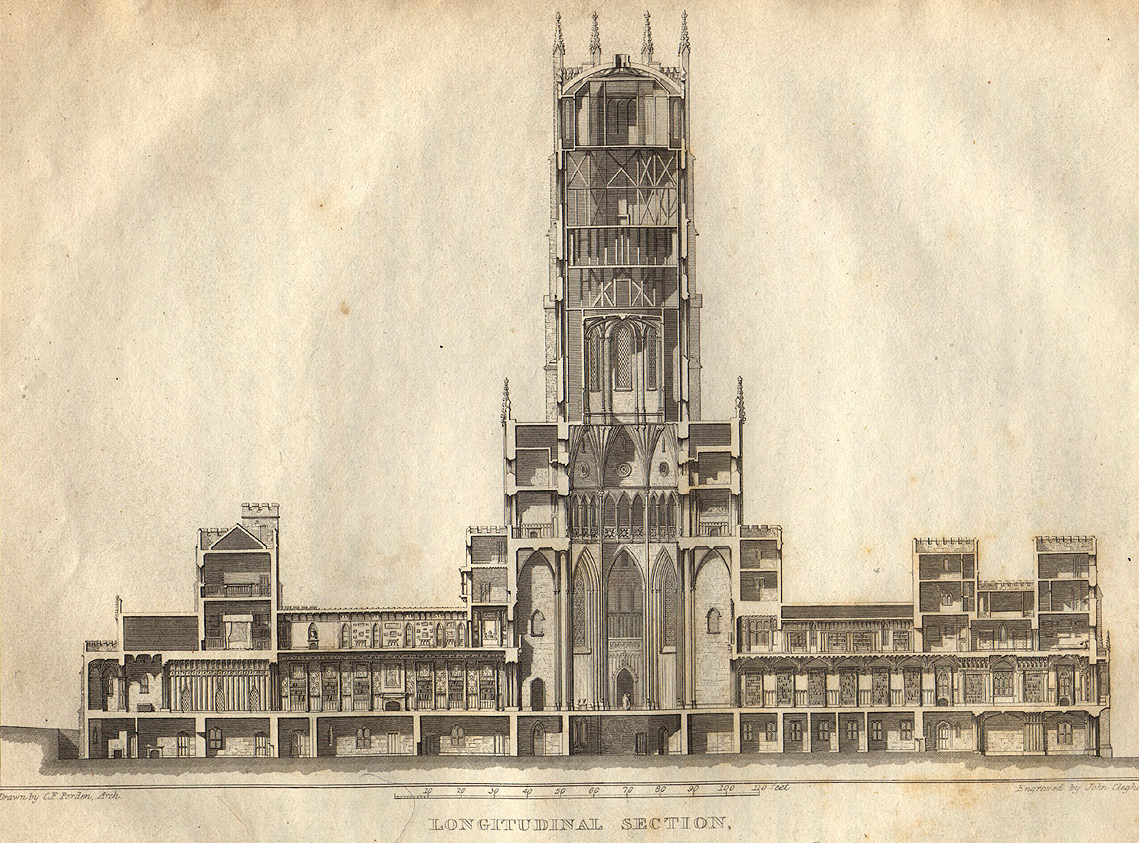
Cross section of Fonthill Abbey made in 1823

Fonthill Abbey was the brainchild of William Beckford, the son of politician William Beckford and a student of architect Sir William Chambers, as well as of James Wyatt, architect of the project.

In 1771, when Beckford was ten years old, he inherited £1 million (equivalent to £109,850,000 in 2025) and an income which his contemporaries estimated at around £100,000 per annum, a colossal amount at the time, but which biographers have found to be closer to half of that sum. Newspapers of the period described him as "the richest commoner in England".

He first met William Courtenay (Viscount Courtenay's 11-year-old son) in 1778. A spectacular Christmas party lasting for three days was held for the boy at Fonthill. During this time (c.1782), Beckford began writing Vathek, his most famous novel. In 1784, Beckford was accused by Courtenay's uncle, the 1st Baron Loughborough, of having molested Courtenay over a prolonged period. The allegations of misconduct remained unproven, but the scandal was significant enough to require his exile.

Beckford chose exile in the company of his wife, Lady Margaret Gordon, whom he grew to love deeply; however, she died in childbirth after the couple had found refuge in Switzerland. Beckford travelled extensively after this tragedy—to France (repeatedly), to Germany, Italy, Spain, and Portugal (the country he favoured above all). Shunned by English society, he nevertheless decided to return to his native country; after enclosing the Fonthill estate in a 6-mile (9.7 km) long wall (high enough to prevent hunters from chasing foxes and hares on his property), the arch-romantic Beckford decided to have a Gothic cathedral built for his home.

Fonthill Abbey would be vast, reflecting "the aesthetic category of 'the Sublime' as defined by the philosopher Edmund Burke in the middle of the eighteenth century."

== Construction ==
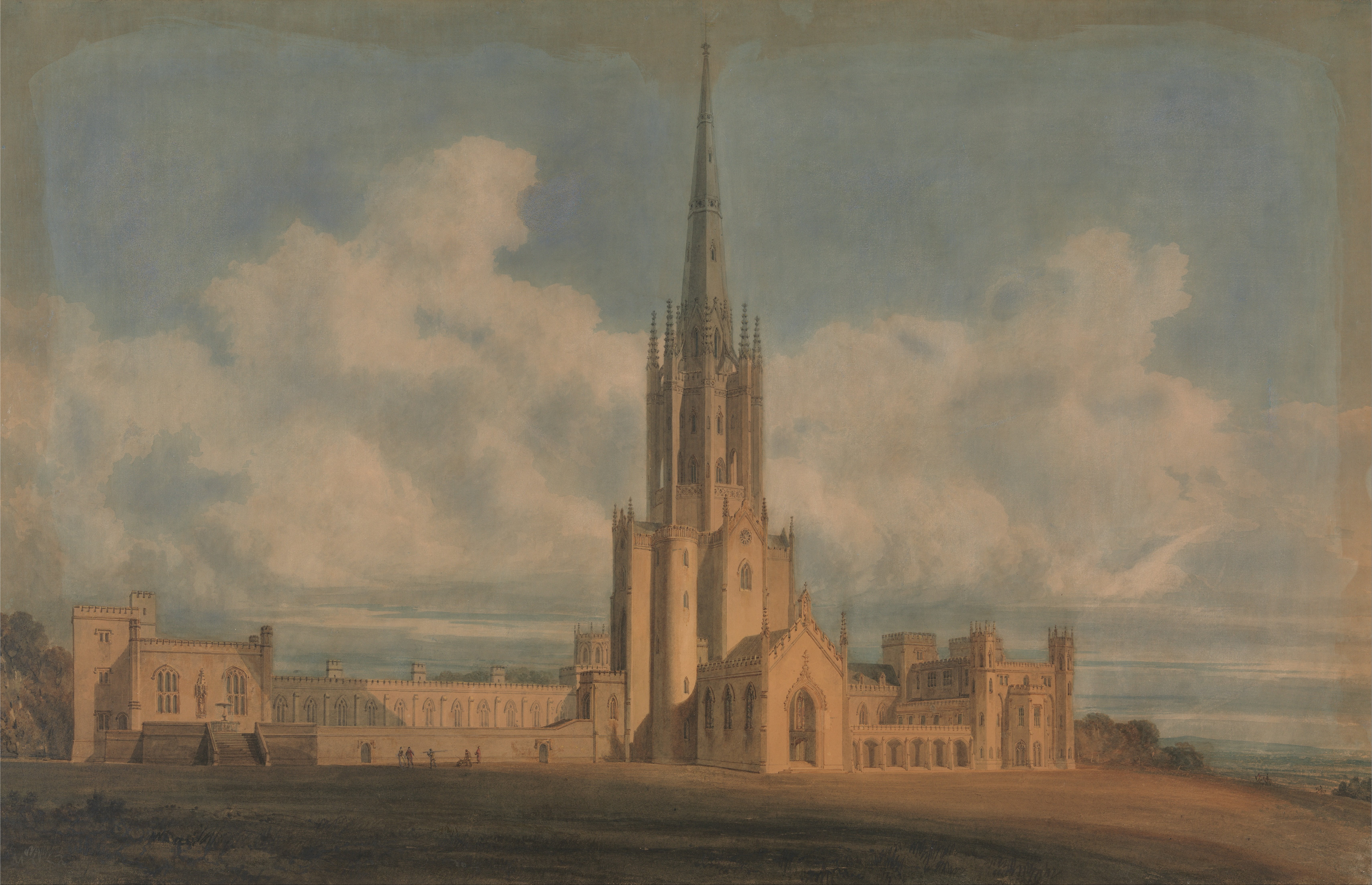
Wyatt's projected design for Fonthill from the west in 1798

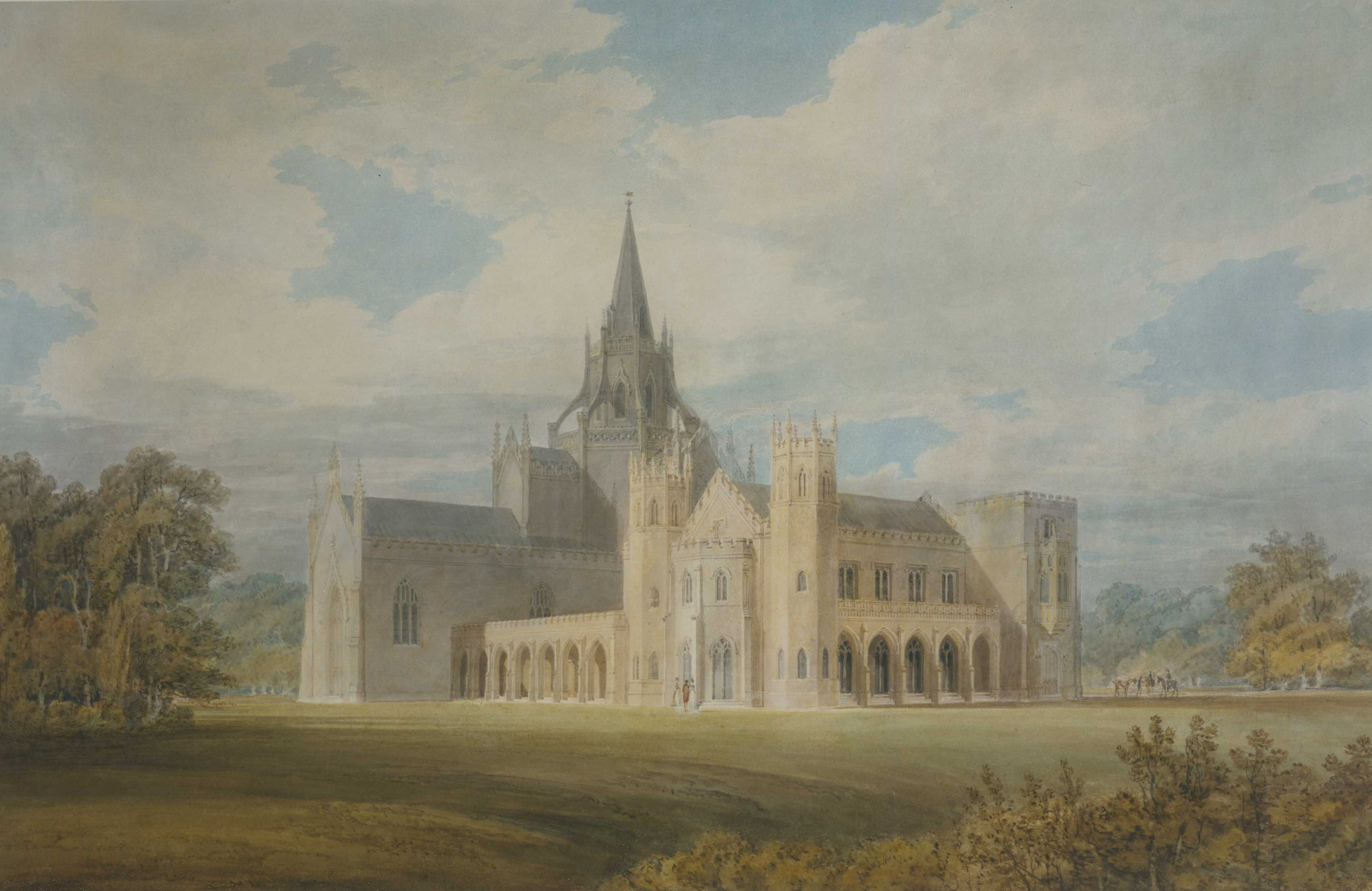
Fonthill Abbey from the South West (J. M. W. Turner, 1799)

Construction of the abbey began in earnest in 1796 on Beckford's estate of Fonthill Gifford near Hindon in southern Wiltshire. He hired James Wyatt, one of the most popular and successful architects of the late 18th-century, to lead the works. Wyatt was often accused of spending a good deal of his time on women and drink. Consequently, he also angered many of his clients—including Beckford—because of his all too common absences from client meetings, for a general disregard for supervising the construction works he was in charge of, and for not delivering the promised results in time, with clients accusing him—in certain instances—of years of delay.

Although suffering from a relationship which was at times strained, Beckford and Wyatt engaged in the construction of the abbey. It is clear, however, that Beckford, due to Wyatt's constant absences from the site, and because of the intense personal interest he had in the enterprise, often took on the roles of construction site supervisor, general organiser, and patron, as well as client. Indeed, his biographers and his correspondence indicate that, during Wyatt's prolonged absences, he took it upon himself to direct the construction of the Abbey, as well as leading the landscaping efforts on his estate.

Furthermore, the evidence suggests that not only was he happy to undertake all of those duties but, as Brockman suggests, must even have lived some of the brightest moments of his adult life managing the gigantic efforts at Fonthill. This is not to say that Wyatt's role in the construction was by any means less than Beckford's. Wyatt had not only designed the building (based on Beckford's ideas), but was ultimately a master at combining the different volumes and scales. By combining different architectural styles and elements, Wyatt achieved a faux effect of layered historical development in the building.

Glass painter Francis Eginton did much work in the building, including thirty-two figures of kings, knights, etc., and many windows, for which Beckford paid him £12,000. Additional windows were provided by Eginton's son and successor in business, William Raphael Eginton, and installed before 1816.

Beckford's 500 labourers worked in day and night shifts. To speed the work, he out-bid (some would say bribed) 450 more from the building of the new royal apartments at Windsor Castle by increasing an ale ration. He also commandeered all the local wagons for transportation of building materials. To compensate, Beckford delivered free coal and blankets to the poor in cold weather.

The first part to be built was the tower, which reached about 90 metres (300 ft) before it collapsed. The new tower was finished six years later, again 90 metres tall. It collapsed as well. Beckford immediately started to build another one, this time with stone, and this work was finished in seven years.

=== Decorations ===
The abbey part was decorated in silver, gold, red and purple. Four long wings radiated from the octagonal central room. Its front doors were 35 feet (11 m) tall. It was declared finished in 1813.

== Use ==
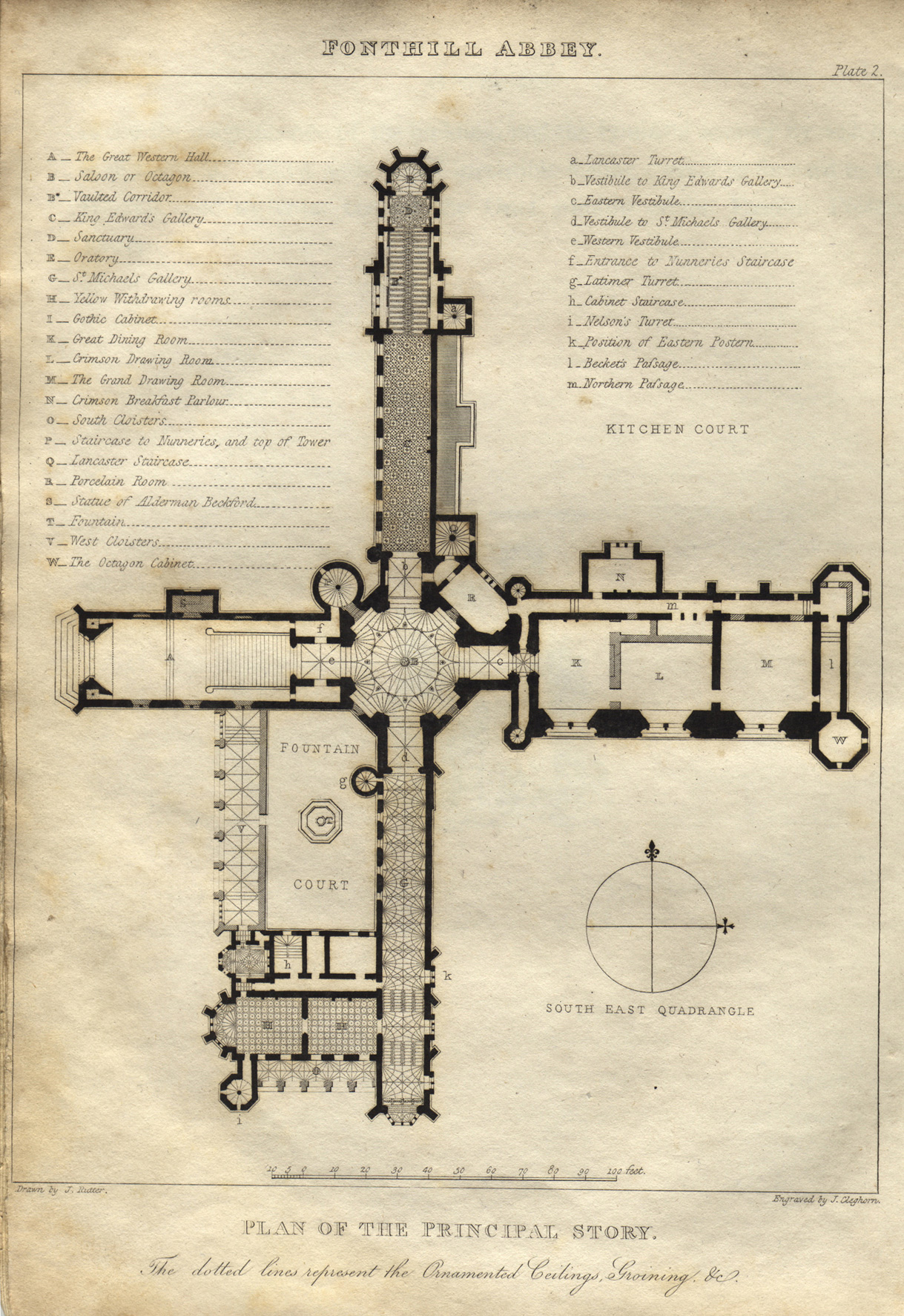
A plan of the main floor (Rutter, 1823)

The approach to the abbey, some 900 metres long and named the Great Western Avenue, ran in a straight line through woodland ENE from the Hindon-Tisbury road. Beckford lived alone in his abbey and used only one of its bedrooms. His kitchens prepared food for 12 every day, although he always dined alone and sent the surplus food away afterwards. Only once, in 1800, did he entertain guests, when Horatio Nelson, Sir William Hamilton and Emma Hamilton visited the abbey for Christmas.

Once he stipulated that he would eat a Christmas dinner only if it were served from the new abbey kitchens, and told his workmen to hurry. The kitchens collapsed as soon as the meal was over.

Beckford lived in Fonthill Abbey until 1822 when he lost two of his Jamaican sugar plantations in a legal action. He was forced to sell it and its contents for £330,000 (equivalent to £36,250,000 in 2025) to arms dealer John Farquhar. William Hazlitt took the opportunity to look around Fonthill and its collections. He disagreed with Beckford's taste, remarking

It is, in a word, a desert of magnificence, a glittering waste of laborious idleness, a cathedral turned into a toy-shop, an immense Museum of all that is most curious and costly, and, at the same time, most worthless, in the productions of art and nature.

== Collapse ==
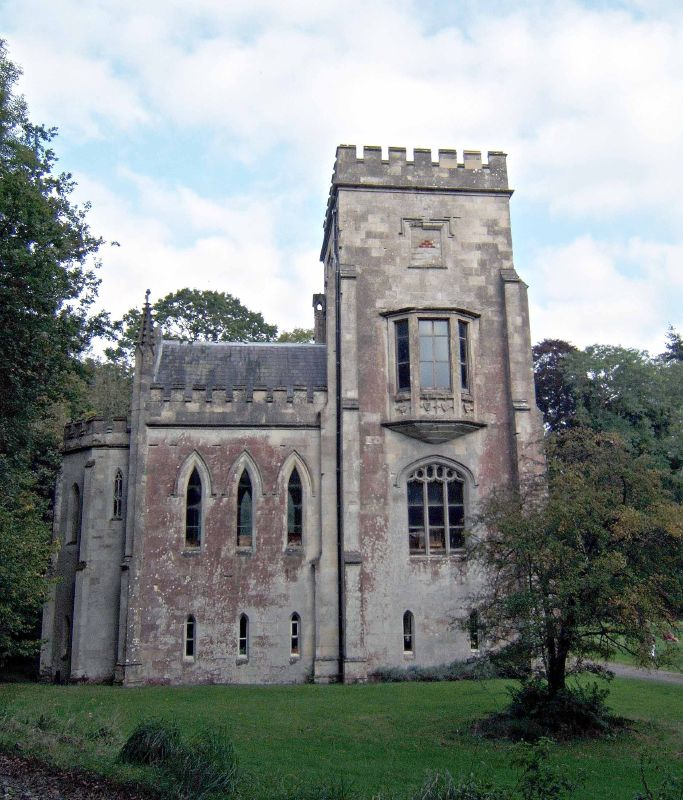
The remains of Fonthill Abbey; Lancaster Tower and attached ranges, partly rebuilt

Beckford's obsessive haste in erecting the grandiose building, coupled with his wish to achieve heights in the tower which were structurally unsound, and the use of a building method called "compo-cement" by Wyatt, which consisted of timber stuccoed with cement, led to the eventual collapse of the tower—damaging the western wing of the building too—in 1825. By this time, Beckford had already sold the building. He died in 1844 in Bath.

The rest of the abbey was demolished c. 1845. Only a small two-storey remnant of the north wing, with a four-storey tower, still stands; this fragment was designated as Grade II* listed in 1966. Stone from the site, including windows and carvings, was used in the construction of buildings in nearby Tisbury.

== Fonthill New Abbey ==
The western part of Beckford's estate was later acquired by the 2nd Marquess of Westminster, who had a new Fonthill Abbey built in 1846–1852 (Pevsner) or 1856–1859 (VCH), some 500 metres southeast of the site of Beckford's abbey. This mansion, designed by William Burn in Scottish Baronial style, was demolished in 1955.

The stable buildings survive in residential use, as do four lodges at estate entrances, built in or around 1860: Tisbury Lodge, south of Fonthill Gifford church, designed in matching Scottish style by Burn; Lawn Lodge, further south along the same road, also by Burn but in plain ashlar; West Gate Lodge, in the southwest of Beckford's estate, in red and yellow brick; and Stone Gate Lodge, at Beckford's western entrance, in the same brick style.

Ornamental stonework also survives in the grounds of the former mansion. Two groups of four statues, representing the four seasons and the four elements, stand among trees southeast of the site; they are thought to have been bought by the Marquess at the Paris Exhibition of 1855 or 1867. To the northwest, close to the site of Beckford's abbey, are three decorated urns on plinths, said to be from the same source.
