= Fonthill Grottoes =

Protected area in Wiltshire, England

Fonthill Grottoes is a 0.69 hectare biological Site of Special Scientific Interest, in woodland adjacent to Fonthill Lake in Wiltshire, notified in 1994. Its SSSI designation is due to its roosting bats: the site is the sixth largest hibernaculum in Britain.

The site consists of three subterranean grotto follies, constructed in the 18th century, split between two areas, one on the western side of the lake, at grid reference ST933316 and one on the eastern side at grid reference ST937315.

The three follies are named "The Dark Walks", "The Hermitage" and "The Quarry".

== Biological interest ==
The site is used as a hibernation roost site by up to 207 bats of up to nine species. Greater and lesser horseshoe bats are among seven species which roost here on a regular basis, and Bechstein's bat and the barbastelle, two species rare in Britain, have each been recorded on several occasions.

== Sources ==
- Natural England citation sheet for the site (accessed 31 March 2022)
