= List of United Kingdom by-elections (1832–1847) =

This is a list of parliamentary by-elections in the United Kingdom held between 1832 and 1847, with the names of the previous incumbent and the victor in the by-election and their respective parties. Where seats changed political party at the election, the result is highlighted: light blue for a Conservative (or Tory before 1835) gain, orange for a Whig gain and green for Irish Repeal gain.

== Resignations ==
Where the cause of by-election is given as "resignation" or "seeks re-election", this indicates that the incumbent was appointed on his own request to an "office of profit under the Crown", either the Steward of the Chiltern Hundreds, the Steward of the Manor of Northstead, the Steward of the Manor of Hempholme, the Steward of the Manor of East Hendred or the Steward of the Manor of Poynings. These appointments are made as a constitutional device for leaving the House of Commons, whose Members are not permitted to resign.

== By-elections ==
=== 14th Parliament (1841–1847) ===
By-election	Date	Former incumbent	Party	Winner	Party	Cause
County Cork	2 July 1847	Daniel O'Connell	Repeal	Maurice Power	Repeal	Death
Derby	16 June 1847 (Note: An uncontested by-election.)	Viscount Duncannon	Whig	Frederick Leveson-Gower	Whig	Succession to a peerage
County Galway	17 May 1847	Thomas Barnwall Martin	Whig	Thomas Burke	Repeal	Death
East Somerset	10 April 1847	William Gore-Langton	Whig	William Pinney	Whig	Death
Bedfordshire	30 March 1847	William Thornton Astell	Conservative	Lord Charles Russell	Whig	Death
Lewes	17 March 1847	Sir Howard Elphinstone	Whig	Robert Perfect	Whig	Resignation
Canterbury	15 March 1847	James Bradshaw	Conservative	Lord Albert Conyngham	Whig	Death
Galway Borough	17 February 1847	Sir Valentine Blake	Repeal	James Henry Monahan	Whig	Death
Middlesex	3 February 1847	George Byng	Whig	Lord Robert Grosvenor	Whig	Death
West Sussex	2 February 1847	Charles Wyndham	Conservative	Richard Prime	Conservative	Resignation
Chester	30 January 1847	Lord Robert Grosvenor	Whig	Earl Grosvenor	Whig	Resignation to contest Middlesex
Salisbury	25 January 1847	Ambrose Hussey	Conservative	William James Chaplin	Whig	Resignation
North Lincolnshire	12 January 1847	Lord Worsley	Whig	Sir Montague Cholmeley	Whig	Succession to a peerage
East Worcestershire	11 January 1847	John Barneby	Conservative	George Rushout	Conservative	Resignation
Renfrewshire	9 December 1846	Patrick Maxwell Stewart	Whig	William Mure	Conservative	Death
Clonmel	12 September 1846	David Richard Pigot	Whig	Cecil John Lawless	Repeal	Resignation (Lord Chief Baron of the Exchequer in Ireland)
Derby	4 September 1846	Edward Strutt	Whig	Edward Strutt	Whig	Resignation pending appointment as President of the Railway Commission
St. Albans	11 August 1846	The Earl of Listowel	Whig	Benjamin Bond Cabbell	Conservative	Lord-in-waiting (Note: Seat vacated on appointment to the office noted.)
Chester	8 August 1846	Lord Robert Grosvenor	Whig	Lord Robert Grosvenor	Whig	Treasurer of the Household
Dundalk	31 July 1846	Thomas Nicholas Redington	Whig	Daniel O'Connell Jnr	Repeal	Resignation (Under-Secretary for Ireland)
County Kilkenny	29 July 1846	Pierce Butler	Repeal	Richard Smithwicke	Repeal	Death
Sutherland	28 July 1846	David Dundas	Whig	David Dundas	Whig	Solicitor General for England and Wales
St. Ives	21 July 1846	William Tyringham Praed	Conservative	Lord William Powlett	Conservative	Death
County Roscommon	21 July 1846	The O'Conor Don	Repeal	The O'Conor Don	Whig	Junior Lord of the Treasury
South Lancashire	21 July 1846	Lord Francis Egerton	Conservative	William Brown	Whig	Elevation to the peerage
West Riding of Yorkshire	18 July 1846	Viscount Morpeth	Whig	Viscount Morpeth	Whig	First Commissioner of Woods and Forests
South Staffordshire	17 July 1846	George Anson	Whig	George Anson	Whig	Clerk of the Ordnance
Kirkcudbrightshire	17 July 1846	Thomas Maitland	Whig	Thomas Maitland	Whig	Solicitor General for Scotland
Liskeard	15 July 1846	Charles Buller	Whig	Charles Buller	Whig	Judge Advocate General
Lichfield	15 July 1846	Lord Alfred Paget	Whig	Lord Alfred Paget	Whig	Chief Equerry and Clerk Marshal
Edinburgh	15 July 1846	Thomas Babington Macaulay	Whig	Thomas Babington Macaulay	Whig	Paymaster General
Richmond	13 July 1846	Henry Rich	Whig	Henry Rich	Whig	Junior Lord of the Treasury
Manchester	13 July 1846	Thomas Milner Gibson	Whig	Thomas Milner Gibson	Whig	Vice-President of the Board of Trade
Greenwich	13 July 1846	James Whitley Deans Dundas	Whig	James Whitley Deans Dundas	Whig	Second Naval Lord
Edinburgh	13 July 1846	William Gibson Craig	Whig	William Gibson Craig	Whig	Junior Lord of the Treasury
Tower Hamlets	11 July 1846	Charles Richard Fox	Whig	Charles Richard Fox	Whig	Surveyor-General of the Ordnance
Plymouth	11 July 1846	Viscount Ebrington	Whig	Viscount Ebrington	Whig	Junior Lord of the Treasury
Perth	11 July 1846	Fox Maule	Whig	Fox Maule	Whig	Secretary at War
Hertford	11 July 1846	William Cowper	Whig	William Cowper	Whig	Civil Lord of the Admiralty
Gloucester	11 July 1846	Maurice Berkeley	Whig	Maurice Berkeley	Whig	Third Naval Lord
Evesham	11 July 1846	Lord Marcus Hill	Whig	Lord Marcus Hill	Whig	Comptroller of the Household
Chester	11 July 1846	John Jervis	Whig	John Jervis	Whig	Solicitor General for England and Wales
Tiverton	10 July 1846	The Viscount Palmerston	Whig	The Viscount Palmerston	Whig	Foreign Secretary
Taunton	10 July 1846	Henry Labouchere	Whig	Henry Labouchere	Whig	Resignation pending appointment as Chief Secretary for Ireland
Dungarvan	10 July 1846	Richard Lalor Sheil	Whig	Richard Lalor Sheil	Whig	Master of the Mint
Devonport	10 July 1846	Sir George Grey	Whig	Sir George Grey	Whig	Home Secretary
Leith Burghs	9 July 1846	Andrew Rutherfurd	Whig	Andrew Rutherfurd	Whig	Lord Advocate
Halifax	9 July 1846	Charles Wood	Whig	Charles Wood	Whig	Chancellor of the Exchequer
Worcester	8 July 1846	Thomas Wilde	Whig	Denis Le Marchant	Whig	Attorney General for England and Wales
Nottingham	8 July 1846	John Cam Hobhouse	Whig	John Cam Hobhouse	Whig	President of the Board of Control
City of London	8 July 1846	Lord John Russell	Whig	Lord John Russell	Whig	Prime Minister and First Lord of the Treasury
County Carlow	1 July 1846	Thomas Bunbury	Conservative	William McClintock-Bunbury	Conservative	Death
Falkirk Burghs	2 May 1846	William Baird	Conservative	Earl of Lincoln	Conservative	Resignation
Malton	15 April 1846	John Walbanke-Childers	Whig	Viscount Milton	Whig	Resignation
Richmond	8 April 1846	William Ridley-Colborne	Whig	Henry Rich	Whig	Death
Windsor	14 March 1846	Ralph Neville	Conservative	Ralph Neville	Conservative	Junior Lord of the Treasury
Stafford	13 March 1846	Swynfen Carnegie	Conservative	Swynfen Carnegie	Conservative	Junior Lord of the Treasury
Bridport	7 March 1846	Alexander Baillie-Cochrane	Conservative	Alexander Baillie-Cochrane	Conservative	Seeks re-election as a supporter of free trade
Bridport	7 March 1846	Alexander Baillie-Cochrane	Conservative	John Romilly	Whig	By-Election result reversed on petition
North Nottinghamshire	6 March 1846	Henry Gally Knight	Conservative	Lord Henry Bentinck	Conservative	Death
County Mayo	2 March 1846	Mark Blake	Repeal	Joseph Myles McDonnell	Repeal	Resignation
South Nottinghamshire	27 February 1846	Earl of Lincoln	Conservative	Thomas Thoroton-Hildyard	Conservative	Chief Secretary for Ireland
East Gloucestershire	27 February 1846	Francis Charteris	Conservative	Marquess of Worcester	Conservative	Resignation
South Northamptonshire	24 February 1846	William Ralph Cartwright	Conservative	Richard Henry Howard Vyse	Conservative	Resignation
Westminster	19 February 1846	Henry John Rous	Conservative	George de Lacy Evans	Whig	Fourth Naval Lord
East Suffolk	19 February 1846	John Henniker-Major	Conservative	Edward Gooch	Conservative	Resignation
Dorset	19 February 1846	Lord Ashley	Conservative	Henry Ker Seymer	Conservative	Resignation
Dorset	19 February 1846	Henry Sturt	Conservative	John Floyer	Conservative	Resignation
Rutlandshire	14 February 1846	William Dawnay	Conservative	George Finch	Conservative	Resignation
Selkirkshire	12 February 1846	Alexander Pringle	Conservative	Allen Eliott-Lockhart	Conservative	Resignation (Clerk of Sasines)
Buckingham	11 February 1846	Thomas Fremantle	Conservative	Marquess of Chandos	Conservative	Resignation
Chichester	10 February 1846	Lord Arthur Lennox	Conservative	Lord Henry Lennox	Conservative	Resignation
Buteshire	7 February 1846	James Archibald Stuart-Wortley	Conservative	James Archibald Stuart-Wortley	Conservative	Judge Advocate General
Cashel	5 February 1846	Joseph Stock	Whig	Timothy O'Brien	Repeal	Resignation
West Riding of Yorkshire	4 February 1846	John Stuart Wortley	Conservative	Viscount Morpeth	Whig	Succession to a peerage
East Sussex	3 February 1846	George Darby	Conservative	Charles Frewen	Conservative	Resignation
Ripon	2 February 1846	Thomas Berry Cusack Smith	Conservative	Edwin Lascelles	Conservative	Resignation (Master of the Rolls in Ireland)
Lichfield	31 January 1846	Lord Leveson	Whig	Edward Lloyd-Mostyn	Whig	Succession to a peerage
Cork City	31 January 1846	Francis Murphy	Whig	Alexander McCarthy	Repeal	Resignation
Midhurst	30 January 1846	Horace Seymour	Conservative	Spencer Horatio Walpole	Conservative	Resignation to contest Antrim
Newark	29 January 1846 (Note: Gladstone did not stand for re-election as he had lost the support of his borough's patron. Gladstone did not stand again until the 1847 general election where he was successful at regaining a seat.)	William Ewart Gladstone	Conservative	John Stuart	Conservative	Secretary of State for War and the Colonies
Buckingham	20 January 1846	Sir John Chetwode	Conservative	John Hall	Conservative	Death
Hertfordshire	8 January 1846	Viscount Grimston	Conservative	Thomas Plumer Halsey	Conservative	Succession to a peerage
County Antrim	22 December 1845	John Irving	Conservative	Horace Seymour	Conservative	Death
Woodstock	18 December 1845	John Henry Loftus	Conservative	Lord Alfred Spencer-Churchill	Conservative	Succession to a peerage
Windsor	8 November 1845	John Ramsbottom	Whig	George Alexander Reid	Conservative	Death
South Warwickshire	5 November 1845	Sir John Mordaunt	Conservative	Lord Brooke	Conservative	Death
Wigan	16 October 1845	Peter Greenall	Conservative	James Alexander Lindsay	Conservative	Death
Southwark	12 September 1845	Benjamin Wood	Whig	Sir William Molesworth	Whig	Death
Linlithgowshire	22 August 1845	Charles Hope	Conservative	William Baillie	Conservative	Resignation (Lieutenant Governor of the Isle of Man)
Kirkcudbrightshire	20 August 1845	Alexander Murray	Conservative	Thomas Maitland	Conservative	Death
Belfast	20 August 1845	James Emerson Tennent	Whig	Lord John Chichester	Whig	Resignation
Sunderland	15 August 1845	Viscount Howick	Whig	George Hudson	Conservative	Succession to a peerage
Cirencester	14 August 1845	William Cripps	Conservative	William Cripps	Conservative	Junior Lord of the Treasury
Warwick	13 August 1845	Charles Eurwicke Douglas	Conservative	Charles Eurwicke Douglas	Conservative	Commissioner of Greenwich Hospital
Chichester	12 August 1845	Lord Arthur Lennox	Conservative	Lord Arthur Lennox	Conservative	Clerk of the Ordnance
Hereford	31 July 1845	Edward Bolton Clive	Whig	Sir Robert Price	Whig	Death
Cambridge	16 July 1845	Fitzroy Kelly	Conservative	Fitzroy Kelly	Conservative	Solicitor General for England and Wales
Abingdon	9 July 1845	Frederic Thesiger	Conservative	Frederic Thesiger	Conservative	Attorney General for England and Wales
West Suffolk	7 July 1845	Robert Rushbrooke	Conservative	Philip Bennet	Conservative	Death
Exeter	7 July 1845	William Webb Follett	Conservative	Sir John Duckworth	Conservative	Death
Dartmouth	3 July 1845	Joseph Somes	Conservative	George Moffatt	Whig	Death
Midlothian	25 June 1845	William Ramsay Ramsay	Conservative	Sir John Hope	Conservative	Resignation
Down	3 June 1845	Earl of Hillsborough	Conservative	Lord Edwin Hill	Conservative	Succession to a peerage
Denbighshire	7 May 1845	Sir Watkin Williams-Wynn	Conservative	Sir Watkin Williams-Wynn	Conservative	Steward of Bromfield and Yale
Peeblesshire	5 May 1845	William Forbes Mackenzie	Conservative	William Forbes Mackenzie	Conservative	Junior Lord of the Treasury
Woodstock	1 May 1845	Marquess of Blandford	Conservative	John Henry Loftus	Conservative	Resignation
Leominster	26 April 1845	Henry Barkly	Whig	Charles Greenaway	Conservative	Resignation
West Kent	25 April 1845	Viscount Marsham	Conservative	Thomas Austen	Conservative	Succession to a peerage
Greenock	18 April 1845	Robert Wallace	Whig	Walter Baine	Whig	Resignation
Shaftesbury	5 March 1845	Lord Howard of Effingham	Whig	Richard Brinsley Sheridan	Whig	Succession to a peerage
East Kent	3 March 1845	Sir Edward Knatchbull	Conservative	William Deedes	Conservative	Resignation
Thetford	24 February 1845	Bingham Baring	Conservative	Bingham Baring	Conservative	Paymaster General
County Tipperary	21 February 1845	Robert Otway-Cave	Whig	Richard Albert Fitzgerald	Repeal	Resignation
Buckinghamshire	21 February 1845	Charles Robert Scott Murray	Conservative	Christopher Tower	Conservative	Resignation
East Cornwall	20 February 1845	Lord Eliot	Conservative	William Pole-Carew	Conservative	Succession to a peerage
Lewes	17 February 1845	Henry Fitzroy	Conservative	Henry Fitzroy	Conservative	Civil Lord of the Admiralty
South Wiltshire	15 February 1845	Sidney Herbert	Conservative	Sidney Herbert	Conservative	Secretary at War
Stamford	10 February 1845	Sir George Clerk	Conservative	Sir George Clerk	Conservative	Vice-President of the Board of Trade and Master of the Mint
Buckingham	10 February 1845	Thomas Fremantle	Conservative	Thomas Fremantle	Conservative	Chief Secretary for Ireland
Dartmouth	27 December 1844	Sir John Seale	Whig	Joseph Somes	Conservative	Death
North Lancashire	20 September 1844	Lord Stanley	Conservative	John Talbot Clifton	Conservative	Resignation and elevation to the House of Lords through a Writ of acceleration
Dudley	8 August 1844	Thomas Hawkes	Conservative	John Benbow	Conservative	Resignation
Cirencester	2 August 1844	Thomas Chester-Master	Conservative	Viscount Villiers	Conservative	Resignation
Birmingham	15 July 1844	Joshua Scholefield	Whig	Richard Spooner	Conservative	Death
Limerick City	9 July 1844	David Roche	Repeal	James Kelly	Repeal	Resignation
Enniskillen	18 June 1844	Arthur Henry Cole	Conservative	Henry Arthur Cole	Conservative	Resignation
Kilmarnock Burghs	29 May 1844	Alexander Johnston	Whig	Edward Pleydell-Bouverie	Whig	Death
Chichester	27 May 1844	Lord Arthur Lennox	Conservative	Lord Arthur Lennox	Conservative	Junior Lord of the Treasury
Buckingham	25 May 1844	Sir Thomas Francis Fremantle	Conservative	Sir Thomas Francis Fremantle	Conservative	Secretary at War
South Lancashire	24 May 1844	Richard Bootle-Wilbraham	Conservative	William Entwisle	Conservative	Death
Launceston	20 May 1844	Henry Hardinge	Conservative	William Bowles	Conservative	Resignation (Governor-General of India)
Abingdon	11 May 1844	Thomas Duffield	Conservative	Frederic Thesiger	Conservative	Resignation
Horsham	1 May 1844	Robert Scarlett	Conservative	Robert Henry Hurst	Whig	Succession to a peerage
Woodstock	22 April 1844	Frederic Thesiger	Conservative	Marquess of Blandford	Conservative	Solicitor General for England and Wales
Huntingdon	22 April 1844	Frederick Pollock	Conservative	Thomas Baring	Conservative	Resignation (Chief Baron of the Exchequer)
Exeter	20 April 1844	William Webb Follett	Conservative	William Webb Follett	Conservative	Attorney General for England and Wales
Hastings	30 March 1844	Joseph Planta	Conservative	Musgrave Brisco	Conservative	Resignation
Christchurch	28 March 1844	George Henry Rose	Conservative	Edward Harris	Conservative	Resignation
County Londonderry	13 March 1844	Robert Bateson	Conservative	Thomas Bateson	Conservative	Death
North Wiltshire	12 February 1844	Francis Burdett	Conservative	Thomas Sotheron	Conservative	Death
County Tipperary	10 February 1844	Valentine Maher	Whig	Nicholas Maher	Repeal	Death
Devizes	7 February 1844	Thomas Sotheron	Conservative	William Heald Ludlow Bruges	Conservative	Resignation to contest North Wiltshire
County Kilkenny	1 December 1843	George Bryan	Repeal	Pierce Somerset Butler	Whig	Death
Salisbury	24 November 1843	Wadham Wyndham	Conservative	John Henry Campbell	Conservative	Death
Kendal	9 November 1843	George William Wood	Whig	Henry Warburton	Whig	Death
City of London	20 October 1843	Sir Matthew Wood	Whig	James Pattison	Whig	Death
Argyllshire	8 September 1843	Alexander Campbell Cameron	Conservative	Duncan McNeill	Conservative	Resignation
Ayrshire	3 August 1843	Viscount Kelburn	Conservative	Alexander Oswald	Conservative	Succession to a peerage
Durham City	26 July 1843	The Viscount Dungannon	Conservative	John Bright	Whig	Void By-Election
Salisbury	4 May 1843	William Bird Brodie	Whig	Ambrose Hussey	Conservative	Resignation
East Suffolk	18 April 1843	Charles Broke Vere	Conservative	The Lord Rendlesham	Conservative	Death
Nottingham	5 April 1843	John Walter	Conservative	Thomas Gisborne	Whig	Void By-Election
Durham City	5 April 1843	Robert FitzRoy	Conservative	The Viscount Dungannon	Conservative	Resignation (Governor of New Zealand)
Athlone	4 April 1843	Daniel Farrell	Whig	John Collett	Whig	Void Election
Cambridge	21 March 1843	Sir Alexander Grant	Conservative	Fitzroy Kelly	Conservative	Resignation
Ripon	18 March 1843	Thomas Pemberton Leigh	Conservative	Thomas Cusack-Smith	Conservative	Resignation
Tavistock	16 March 1843	John Rundle	Whig	John Salusbury-Trelawny	Whig	Resignation
North Warwickshire	10 March 1843	Sir John Eardley-Wilmot	Conservative	Charles Newdigate Newdegate	Conservative	Resignation (Lieutenant-Governor of Van Diemen's Land)
Ashburton	8 March 1843	William Jardine	Whig	James Matheson	Whig	Death
Coleraine	18 February 1843	Edward Litton	Conservative	John Boyd	Conservative	Resignation (Master in Chancery in Ireland)
County Monaghan	17 February 1843	Henry Westenra	Whig	Charles Powell Leslie III	Conservative	Succession to a peerage
County Cavan	17 February 1843	Henry John Clements	Conservative	James Pierce Maxwell	Conservative	Death
Dublin University	10 February 1843	Joseph Devonsher Jackson	Conservative	George Alexander Hamilton	Conservative	Resignation (Puisne Justice of the Common Pleas in Ireland)
Bodmin	9 February 1843	Charles Vivian	Whig	Samuel Thomas Spry	Conservative	Succession to a peerage
North Shropshire	16 January 1843	Sir Rowland Hill	Conservative	Viscount Clive	Conservative	Succession to a peerage
Carmarthenshire	27 December 1842	John Jones	Conservative	David Arthur Saunders Davies	Conservative	Death
Buteshire	1 December 1842	Sir William Rae	Conservative	James Archibald Stuart-Wortley	Conservative	Death
South Hampshire	23 August 1842	John Willis Fleming	Conservative	Lord Charles Wellesley	Conservative	Resignation
Belfast	19 August 1842	James Emerson Tennent	Conservative	James Emerson Tennent	Conservative	Void Election
Belfast	19 August 1842	William Gillilan Johnson	Conservative	David Robert Ross	Whig	Void Election
Ipswich	17 August 1842	The Earl of Desart	Conservative	John Neilson Gladstone	Conservative	Void By-Election
Ipswich	17 August 1842	Thomas Gladstone	Conservative	Sackville Lane-Fox	Conservative	Void By-Election
Southampton	9 August 1842	Lord Bruce	Conservative	Humphrey St John Mildmay	Conservative	Void Election
Southampton	9 August 1842	Charles Cecil Martyn	Conservative	George William Hope	Conservative	Void Election
Nottingham	4 August 1842	Sir George Larpent	Whig	John Walter	Conservative	Resignation in exchange for withdrawal of election petition
Buckinghamshire	15 July 1842	Sir William Young	Conservative	William Edward Fitzmaurice	Conservative	Death
Newcastle-under-Lyme	14 June 1842	John Quincey Harris	Whig	John Quincey Harris	Whig	Void Election
Newcastle-under-Lyme	14 June 1842	John Quincey Harris	Whig	John Campbell Colquhoun	Conservative	By-Election result reversed on petition
County Meath	10 June 1842	Daniel O'Connell	Repeal	Matthew Corbally	Whig	Chose to sit for County Cork
Ipswich	3 June 1842	Rigby Wason	Whig	The Earl of Desart	Conservative	Void Election
Ipswich	3 June 1842	George Rennie	Whig	Thomas Gladstone	Conservative	Void Election
County Londonderry	26 May 1842	Sir Robert Bateson	Conservative	Robert Bateson	Conservative	Resignation
Brighton	5 May 1842	Isaac Newton Wigney	Whig	Lord Alfred Hervey	Conservative	Resignation
Montrose Burghs	16 April 1842	Patrick Chalmers	Whig	Joseph Hume	Whig	Resignation
South Shropshire	3 March 1842	Earl of Darlington	Conservative	Viscount Newport	Conservative	Succession to a peerage
Clackmannanshire and Kinross-shire	18 February 1842	George Abercromby	Whig	Sir William Morison	Whig	Resignation
West Cornwall	16 February 1842	Lord Boscawen-Rose	Conservative	Charles Lemon	Whig	Succession to a peerage
Bandon	14 February 1842	Joseph Devonsher Jackson	Conservative	Viscount Bernard	Conservative	Solicitor-General for Ireland
Taunton	11 February 1842	Edward Thomas Bainbridge	Whig	Sir Thomas Colebrooke	Whig	Resignation
Dublin University	11 February 1842	Thomas Langlois Lefroy	Conservative	Joseph Devonsher Jackson	Conservative	Resignation (Baron of the Exchequer in Ireland)
King's Lynn	10 February 1842	Stratford Canning	Conservative	Viscount Jocelyn	Conservative	Resignation
Liverpool	8 February 1842	Cresswell Cresswell	Conservative	Howard Douglas	Conservative	Resignation (Puisne Justice of the Common Pleas)
Leominster	8 February 1842	James Wigram	Conservative	George Arkwright	Conservative	Resignation (Vice-Chancellor)
Dublin City	29 January 1842	John Beattie West	Conservative	William Henry Gregory	Conservative	Death
Linlithgowshire	20 October 1841	Charles Hope	Conservative	Charles Hope	Conservative	Commissioner of Greenwich Hospital
Wilton	6 October 1841	Viscount FitzHarris	Conservative	Viscount Somerton	Conservative	Succession to a peerage
Hereford	5 October 1841	Henry William Hobhouse	Whig	Robert Pulsford	Whig	Resignation
East Retford	2 October 1841	Arthur Duncombe	Conservative	Arthur Duncombe	Conservative	Groom in Waiting in Ordinary
County Cavan	30 September 1841	John Young	Conservative	John Young	Conservative	Junior Lord of the Treasury
County Sligo	28 September 1841	Alexander Perceval	Conservative	John Ffolliott	Conservative	Junior Lord of the Treasury (Note: MP appointed Serjeant-At-Arms of the House of Lords before writ moved.)
Ripon	27 September 1841	Edward Sugden	Conservative	George Cockburn	Conservative	Resignation (Lord Chancellor of Ireland)
Portarlington	27 September 1841	George Dawson-Damer	Conservative	George Dawson-Damer	Conservative	Comptroller of the Household
Monmouthshire	24 September 1841	Lord Granville Somerset	Conservative	Lord Granville Somerset	Conservative	Chancellor of the Duchy of Lancaster
County Tyrone	23 September 1841	Henry Thomas Lowry-Corry	Conservative	Henry Thomas Lowry-Corry	Conservative	Civil Lord of the Admiralty
Buteshire	23 September 1841	William Rae	Conservative	William Rae	Conservative	Lord Advocate
Westmorland	22 September 1841	Viscount Lowther	Conservative	William Thompson	Conservative	Elevation to the House of Lords through a Writ of acceleration and appointment as Postmaster General
East Cornwall	22 September 1841	Lord Eliot	Conservative	Lord Eliot	Conservative	Chief Secretary for Ireland
North Riding of Yorkshire	21 September 1841	William Duncombe	Conservative	Octavius Duncombe	Conservative	Succession to a peerage
Selkirkshire	21 September 1841	Alexander Pringle	Conservative	Alexander Pringle	Conservative	Junior Lord of the Treasury
North Lancashire	21 September 1841	Lord Stanley	Conservative	Lord Stanley	Conservative	Secretary of State for War and the Colonies
Aberdeenshire	21 September 1841	William Gordon	Conservative	William Gordon	Conservative	Fourth Naval Lord
South Nottinghamshire	20 September 1841	Earl of Lincoln	Conservative	Earl of Lincoln	Conservative	First Commissioner of Woods and Forests
Lisburn	20 September 1841	Henry Meynell	Conservative	Henry Meynell	Conservative	Parliamentary Groom in Waiting
East Kent	20 September 1841	Sir Edward Knatchbull	Conservative	Sir Edward Knatchbull	Conservative	Paymaster General
Sunderland	17 September 1841	William Thompson	Conservative	Viscount Howick	Whig	Resignation in order to contest Westmorland
Cardiff Boroughs	17 September 1841	John Iltyd Nicholl	Conservative	John Iltyd Nicholl	Conservative	Judge Advocate General
Bradford	16 September 1841	William Cunliffe Lister	Whig	William Busfield	Whig	Death
Lichfield	15 September 1841	George Anson	Whig	Lord Leveson	Whig	Resignation
Launceston	15 September 1841	Henry Hardinge	Conservative	Henry Hardinge	Conservative	Secretary at War
Cambridge University	15 September 1841	Henry Goulburn	Conservative	Henry Goulburn	Conservative	Chancellor of the Exchequer
Bridport	15 September 1841	Rufane Shaw Donkin	Whig	Alexander Baillie-Cochrane	Conservative	Resignation in exchange for withdrawal of election petition
Wenlock	14 September 1841	James Milnes Gaskell	Conservative	James Milnes Gaskell	Conservative	Junior Lord of the Treasury
Newark	14 September 1841	William Ewart Gladstone	Conservative	William Ewart Gladstone	Conservative	Vice-President of the Board of Trade and Master of the Mint
Marlborough	14 September 1841	Henry Bingham Baring	Conservative	Henry Bingham Baring	Conservative	Junior Lord of the Treasury
Marlborough	14 September 1841	Lord Ernest Bruce	Conservative	Lord Ernest Bruce	Conservative	Vice-Chamberlain of the Household
Huntingdon	14 September 1841	Jonathan Peel	Conservative	Jonathan Peel	Conservative	Surveyor-General of the Ordnance
Huntingdon	14 September 1841	Frederick Pollock	Conservative	Frederick Pollock	Conservative	Attorney General for England and Wales
Chippenham	14 September 1841	Henry George Boldero	Conservative	Henry George Boldero	Conservative	Clerk of the Ordnance
Bury St. Edmunds	14 September 1841	Earl of Jermyn	Conservative	Earl of Jermyn	Conservative	Treasurer of the Household
Tamworth	13 September 1841	Robert Peel	Conservative	Robert Peel	Conservative	Prime Minister and First Lord of the Treasury
Exeter	13 September 1841	William Webb Follett	Conservative	William Webb Follett	Conservative	Solicitor General for England and Wales
Dorchester	13 September 1841	Sir James Graham	Conservative	Sir James Graham	Conservative	Home Secretary
=== 13th Parliament (1837–1841) ===
By-election	Date	Former incumbent	Party	Winner	Party	Cause
Sandwich	11 May 1841	Rufane Shaw Donkin	Whig	Hugh Hamilton Lindsay	Conservative	Death
Nottingham	26 April 1841	Ronald Craufurd Ferguson	Whig	John Walter	Conservative	Death
County Antrim	14 April 1841 (Note: An uncontested by-election.)	John Bruce Richard O'Neill	Conservative	Nathaniel Alexander	Conservative	Succession to an Irish peerage
King's County	24 February 1841	Nicholas Fitzsimon	Whig	Andrew Armstrong	Whig	Resignation
Richmond	16 February 1841	Alexander Speirs	Whig	George Wentworth-FitzWilliam	Whig	Resignation
St. Albans	9 February 1841	Edward Grimston	Conservative	The Earl of Listowel	Whig	Resignation
Monmouthshire	9 February 1841	William Addams Williams	Whig	Charles Octavius Swinnerton Morgan	Conservative	Resignation
East Surrey	8 February 1841	Richard Alsager	Conservative	Edmund Antrobus	Conservative	Death
Reigate	3 February 1841	Viscount Eastnor	Conservative	Viscount Eastnor	Conservative	Succession to a peerage
Canterbury	3 February 1841	Lord Albert Conyngham	Whig	George Smythe	Conservative	Resignation
Walsall	2 February 1841	Francis Finch	Whig	John Neilson Gladstone	Conservative	Resignation
Kirkcaldy Burghs	27 January 1841	Robert Ferguson	Whig	Robert Ferguson	Whig	Death
County Mayo	16 December 1840	William John Brabazon	Whig	Mark Blake	Whig	Death
County Carlow	5 December 1840	Nicholas Aylward Vigors	Whig	Henry Bruen	Conservative	Death
County Waterford	24 August 1840	John Power	Whig	Robert Carew	Whig	Resignation
Clonmel	21 August 1840	David Richard Pigot	Whig	David Richard Pigot	Whig	Attorney-General for Ireland (Note: Seat vacated on appointment to the office noted.)
County Cavan	12 August 1840	Somerset Maxwell	Conservative	Henry John Clements	Conservative	Resignation
West Surrey	31 July 1840	George Perceval	Conservative	John Trotter	Conservative	Succession to a peerage
Louth	31 July 1840	Henry Chester	Whig	Thomas Fortescue	Whig	Resignation
East Cumberland	20 July 1840	Francis Aglionby	Whig	Charles Howard	Whig	Death
Radnorshire	10 June 1840	Walter Wilkins	Whig	Sir John Walsh	Conservative	Death
Sudbury	5 June 1840	Sir John Walsh	Conservative	George Tomline	Conservative	Resignation to contest Radnorshire
Cockermouth	1 June 1840	Edward Horsman	Whig	Edward Horsman	Whig	Junior Lord of the Treasury
Ludlow	23 May 1840	Thomas Alcock	Whig	Beriah Botfield	Conservative	Void By-Election
Cambridge	23 May 1840	John Manners-Sutton	Conservative	Sir Alexander Grant	Conservative	Void By-Election
Armagh City	22 May 1840	William Curry	Whig	John Dawson Rawdon	Whig	Resignation (Master in Chancery in Ireland)
County Fermanagh	30 April 1840	Viscount Cole	Conservative	Sir Arthur Brooke	Conservative	Succession to a peerage
Elginshire and Nairnshire	25 April 1840	Francis Ogilvy-Grant	Conservative	Charles Lennox Cumming Bruce	Conservative	Resignation
Totnes	21 April 1840	Charles Barry Baldwin	Conservative	Charles Barry Baldwin	Conservative	Previous By-Election voided due to a Double Return
Totnes	21 April 1840	William Blount	Whig	Charles Barry Baldwin	Conservative	Previous By-Election voided due to a Double Return
Sutherland	8 April 1840	William Howard	Conservative	David Dundas	Whig	Resignation
Inverness-shire	31 March 1840	Francis William Grant	Conservative	Henry James Baillie	Conservative	Death
Woodstock	20 March 1840	Marquess of Blandford	Conservative	Frederic Thesiger	Conservative	Succession to a peerage
Helston	12 March 1840	Viscount Cantelupe	Conservative	John Basset	Conservative	Resignation to contest Lewes
Perthshire	9 March 1840	Viscount Stormont	Conservative	Henry Home-Drummond	Conservative	Succession to a peerage
Lewes	9 March 1840	Charles Richard Blunt	Whig	Viscount Cantelupe	Conservative	Death
Inverness Burghs	4 March 1840	Roderick Macleod	Whig	James Morrison	Whig	Resignation
Morpeth	22 February 1840	Lord Leveson	Whig	Edward George Granville Howard	Whig	Resignation
County Meath	4 February 1840	Morgan O'Connell	Whig	Matthew Corbally	Whig	Resignation (First Assistant-Registrar of Deeds for Ireland)
Denbighshire	30 January 1840	Sir Watkin Williams-Wynn	Conservative	Hugh Cholmondeley	Conservative	Death
Rutland	28 January 1840	William Noel	Conservative	Charles Noel	Whig	Resignation
Newark-on-Trent	25 January 1840	Thomas Wilde	Whig	Thomas Wilde	Whig	Solicitor General for England and Wales
Birmingham	25 January 1840	Thomas Attwood	Whig	George Frederick Muntz	Whig	Resignation
Southwark	24 January 1840	Daniel Whittle Harvey	Whig	Benjamin Wood	Whig	Resignation (Commissioner of the City of London Police)
Devonport	24 January 1840	Edward Codrington	Whig	Henry Tufnell	Whig	Resignation
Beverley	24 January 1840	George Lane-Fox	Conservative	Sackville Lane-Fox	Conservative	Resignation
Penryn and Falmouth	23 January 1840	Robert Rolfe	Whig	Edward John Hutchins	Whig	Resignation (Baron of the Exchequer)
Edinburgh	23 January 1840	Thomas Babington Macaulay	Whig	Thomas Babington Macaulay	Whig	Secretary at War
County Tipperary	16 September 1839	Richard Lalor Sheil	Whig	Richard Lalor Sheil	Whig	Vice-President of the Board of Trade
Manchester	7 September 1839	Charles Poulett Thomson	Whig	Robert Hyde Greg	Whig	Resignation (Governor General of Canada)
Waterford City	6 September 1839	Thomas Wyse	Whig	Thomas Wyse	Whig	Junior Lord of the Treasury
Cambridge	6 September 1839	Thomas Spring Rice	Whig	John Manners-Sutton	Conservative	Resignation and elevation to the peerage
Portsmouth	30 August 1839	Francis Thornhill Baring	Whig	Francis Thornhill Baring	Whig	Chancellor of the Exchequer
Perth	19 August 1839	Arthur Kinnaird	Whig	David Greig	Whig	Resignation
Aylesbury	31 July 1839	Winthrop Mackworth Praed	Conservative	Charles Baillie-Hamilton	Conservative	Death
Totnes	26 July 1839	Jasper Parrott	Conservative	Charles Barry Baldwin	Conservative	Resignation (Two MPs elected due to a Double Return)
Totnes	26 July 1839	Jasper Parrott	Conservative	William Blount	Whig	Resignation (Two MPs elected due to a Double Return)
Ipswich	15 July 1839	Thomas Milner Gibson	Conservative	Thomas John Cochrane	Conservative	Seeks re-election upon change of affiliation
Glasgow	24 June 1839	Lord William Bentinck	Whig	James Oswald	Whig	Resignation
Ludlow	6 June 1839	Viscount Clive	Conservative	Thomas Alcock	Whig	Succession to a peerage
Edinburgh	4 June 1839	James Abercromby	Whig	Thomas Babington Macaulay	Whig	Elevation to the peerage
Hertford	20 May 1839	William Cowper	Whig	William Cowper	Whig	Commissioner of Greenwich Hospital
County Tyrone	6 May 1839	Viscount Alexander	Conservative	Lord Claud Hamilton	Conservative	Succession to an Irish peerage
Ayrshire	1 May 1839	John Dunlop	Whig	Viscount Kelburn	Conservative	Death
Leith Burghs	29 April 1839	John Murray	Whig	Andrew Rutherfurd	Whig	Resignation (Judge of the Court of Session)
Leicester	22 March 1839	Samuel Duckworth	Whig	Wynne Ellis	Whig	Resignation (Master in Chancery)
North Devon	18 March 1839	Viscount Ebrington	Whig	Lewis William Buck	Conservative	Elevation to the House of Lords through a Writ of acceleration
Richmond	12 March 1839	Lord Dundas	Whig	Robert Lawrence Dundas	Whig	Succession to a peerage
Wigan	9 March 1839	Richard Potter	Whig	William Ewart	Whig	Resignation
County Leitrim	6 March 1839	Viscount Clements	Whig	Viscount Clements	Whig	Death
Southwark	27 February 1839	Daniel Whittle Harvey	Whig	Daniel Whittle Harvey	Whig	Registrar of the Metropolitan Public Carriages
Carlow Borough	27 February 1839	William Henry Maule	Whig	Francis Bruen	Conservative	Resignation (Baron of the Court of the Exchequer)
Carlow Borough	27 February 1839	Francis Bruen	Conservative	Thomas Gisborne	Whig	By-Election result reversed on petition
Devonport	20 February 1839	Sir George Grey	Whig	Sir George Grey	Whig	Judge Advocate General
Clonmel	18 February 1839	Nicholas Ball	Whig	David Richard Pigot	Whig	Resignation (Judge of the Court of Common Pleas in Ireland)
County Cavan	18 February 1839	Henry Maxwell	Conservative	Somerset Maxwell	Conservative	Succession to an Irish peerage
Buckinghamshire	18 February 1839	Marquess of Chandos	Conservative	Caledon Du Pré	Conservative	Succession to a peerage
Sandwich	12 February 1839	James Rivett-Carnac	Whig	Rufane Shaw Donkin	Whig	Resignation (Governor of Bombay)
Tower Hamlets	11 February 1839	Stephen Lushington	Whig	Stephen Lushington	Whig	Judge of the High Court of Admiralty
Kirkcudbrightshire	31 December 1838	Robert Cutlar Fergusson	Whig	Alexander Murray	Whig	Death
Wycombe	23 October 1838	Robert Smith	Whig	George Robert Smith	Whig	Succession to a peerage
Great Yarmouth	23 August 1838	William Wilshere	Whig	William Wilshere	Whig	Resignation in exchange for withdrawal of election petition
Clonmel	16 July 1838	Nicholas Ball	Whig	Nicholas Ball	Whig	Attorney-General for Ireland
Cashel	14 July 1838	Stephen Woulfe	Whig	Joseph Stock	Whig	Resignation (Chief Baron of the Exchequer in Ireland)
Maidstone	15 June 1838	John Minet Fector	Conservative	John Minet Fector	Conservative	Void By-election
Linlithgowshire	14 June 1838	James Hope-Wallace	Conservative	Charles Hope	Conservative	Resignation
Inverness-shire	12 June 1838	Alexander William Chisholm	Conservative	Francis William Grant	Conservative	Resignation
Dungannon	9 June 1838	Viscount Northland	Conservative	Thomas Knox	Conservative	Resignation
St. Ives	24 May 1838	James Halse	Conservative	William Tyringham Praed	Conservative	Death
Gloucester	21 May 1838	Henry Thomas Hope	Conservative	Henry Thomas Hope	Conservative	Seeks re-election after dismissal of an election petition
Woodstock	11 May 1838	Sir Henry Peyton	Conservative	Marquess of Blandford	Conservative	Resignation in exchange for withdrawal of election petition
West Suffolk	7 May 1838	Robert Hart Logan	Conservative	Harry Spencer Waddington	Conservative	Death
Stamford	1 May 1838	Thomas Chaplin	Conservative	Sir George Clerk	Conservative	Resignation
Haddingtonshire	14 April 1838	Lord Ramsay	Conservative	Sir Thomas Buchan-Hepburn	Conservative	Succession to a peerage
Maidstone	28 March 1838	Wyndham Lewis	Conservative	John Minet Fector	Conservative	Death
Sudbury	27 March 1838	Edward Barnes	Conservative	Sir John Walsh	Conservative	Death
Devizes	26 March 1838	James Whitley Deans Dundas	Whig	James Whitley Deans Dundas	Whig	Clerk of the Ordnance
Devizes	26 March 1838	James Whitley Deans Dundas	Whig	George Heneage Walker Heneage	Conservative	By-Election result reversed on petition
Rutlandshire	13 March 1838	Sir Gerard Noel	Conservative	William Noel	Conservative	Death
West Kent	5 March 1838	Sir William Geary	Conservative	Sir Edmund Filmer	Conservative	Resignation
Marylebone	3 March 1838	Samuel Whalley	Whig	The Lord Teignmouth	Conservative	Void Election
County Tipperary	27 February 1838	Richard Lalor Sheil	Whig	Richard Lalor Sheil	Whig}	Commissioner of Greenwich Hospital
Portsmouth	26 February 1838	John Bonham-Carter	Whig	George Thomas Staunton	Whig	Death
Pembroke Boroughs	20 February 1838	Sir Hugh Owen Owen	Conservative	Sir James Graham	Conservative	Resignation
Bridgnorth	20 February 1838	Henry Hanbury-Tracy	Whig	Sir Robert Pigot	Conservative	Resignation in exchange for withdrawal of election petition
Elgin Burghs	13 February 1838	Andrew Leith Hay	Whig	Fox Maule	Whig	Resignation (Governor of Bermuda)
Galway Borough	12 February 1838	Andrew Henry Lynch	Whig	Andrew Henry Lynch	Whig	Master in Chancery
Sudbury	12 December 1837 (Note: Both Whigs and Conservatives made a pre-election agreement that if one party won both seats than one would resign.)	Sir James Hamilton	Conservative	Joseph Bailey	Conservative	Resignation
Midhurst	12 December 1837	William Stephen Poyntz	Whig	Frederick Spencer	Whig	Resignation
=== 12th Parliament (1835–1837) ===
By-election	Date	Former incumbent	Party	Winner	Party	Cause
Glasgow	27 May 1837	James Oswald	Whig	John Dennistoun	Whig	Resignation
Hythe	16 May 1837 (Note: An uncontested by-election.)	Stewart Marjoribanks	Whig	Viscount Melgund	Whig	Resignation
Bridgwater	16 May 1837	John Temple Leader	Whig	Henry Broadwood	Conservative	Resignation in order to contest Westminster
Westminster	12 May 1837	Francis Burdett	Whig	Francis Burdett	Conservative	Seeks re-election upon changing parties
Huddersfield	8 May 1837	John Blackburne	Whig	Edward Ellice	Whig	Death
Lewes	21 April 1837	Thomas Read Kemp	Whig	Henry Fitzroy	Conservative	Death
Rochdale	19 April 1837	John Entwistle	Conservative	John Fenton	Whig	Death
Ross and Cromarty	18 April 1837	James Alexander Stewart-Mackenzie	Whig	Thomas Mackenzie	Conservative	Resignation (Governor of Ceylon)
Warwick	28 March 1837	Charles Canning	Conservative	William Collins	Whig	Succession to a peerage
Anglesey	23 February 1837	Sir Richard Williams-Bulkeley	Whig	William Owen Stanley	Whig	Resignation
Stafford	21 February 1837	Sir Francis Holyoake-Goodricke	Conservative	Robert Farrand	Conservative	Resignation to contest South Staffordshire
Buckinghamshire	20 February 1837	James Backwell Praed	Conservative	George Simon Harcourt	Conservative	Death
County Carlow	18 February 1837	Thomas Kavanagh	Conservative	Nicholas Aylward Vigors	Whig	Death
Dungarvan	16 February 1837	Michael O'Loghlen	Whig	John Power	Whig	Resignation (Baron of the Exchequer in Ireland)
Cashel	10 February 1837	Stephen Woulfe	Whig	Stephen Woulfe	Whig	Solicitor-General for Ireland (Note: Seat vacated on appointment to the office noted.)
Morpeth	8 February 1837	Edward George Granville Howard	Whig	Lord Leveson	Whig	Resignation
Evesham	4 February 1837	Sir Charles Cockerell	Whig	George Rushout	Conservative	Death
Renfrewshire	30 January 1837	Sir Michael Shaw-Stewart	Whig	George Houstoun	Conservative	Death
Malton	27 January 1837	John Charles Ramsden	Whig	Viscount Milton	Whig	Death
County Longford	30 December 1836	Viscount Forbes	Conservative	Luke White	Whig	Death
County Longford	30 December 1836	Luke White	Whig	Charles Fox	Conservative	By-Election result reversed on petition
Calne	28 September 1836	Earl of Kerry	Whig	John Fox-Strangways	Whig	Death
East Cumberland	2 September 1836	William Blamire	Whig	William James	Whig	Resignation (Chief Tithe Commissioner)
Down	30 August 1836	Lord Arthur Hill	Conservative	Earl of Hillsborough	Whig	Succession to a peerage
Warwick	23 August 1836	Charles John Greville	Conservative	Charles Canning	Conservative	Resignation
Sheffield	22 August 1836	John Parker	Whig	John Parker	Whig	Junior Lord of the Treasury
Newcastle-upon-Tyne	27 July 1836	Sir Matthew White Ridley	Whig	John Hodgson	Conservative	Death
South Warwickshire	1 July 1836	Edward Ralph Charles Sheldon	Whig	Evelyn Shirley	Conservative	Death
Merionethshire	27 June 1836	Sir Robert Vaughan	Whig	Richard Richards	Whig	Resignation
South Essex	9 Jun 1836	Robert Westley Hall-Dare	Whig	George Palmer	Whig	Death
Kilkenny City	17 May 1836	Richard Sullivan	Whig	Daniel O'Connell	Whig	Resignation
County Mayo	6 May 1836	Dominick Browne	Whig	Robert Dillon Browne	Whig	Elevation to the Irish peerage
Paisley	17 March 1836	Alexander Graham Speirs	Whig	Archibald Hastie	Whig	Resignation
Clonmel	20 February 1836	Dominick Ronayne	Whig	Nicholas Ball	Whig	Death
South Leicestershire	18 February 1836	Thomas Frewen Turner	Conservative	Charles William Packe	Conservative	Resignation
Glasgow	17 February 1836	Colin Dunlop	Whig	Lord William Bentinck	Whig	Resignation
Stoke-upon-Trent	15 February 1836	Richard Edensor Heathcote	Whig	George Anson	Whig	Resignation
Cockermouth	15 February 1836	Fretchville Lawson Ballantine Dykes	Whig	Edward Horsman	Whig	Resignation
Malton	12 February 1836	Charles Pepys	Whig	John Walbanke-Childers	Whig	Appointed Lord Chancellor
Devizes	10 February 1836	Philip Charles Durham	Conservative	James Whitley Deans Dundas	Whig	Resignation
West Gloucestershire	2 January 1836	Marquess of Worcester	Conservative	Robert Blagden Hale	Conservative	Succession to a peerage
North Leicestershire	29 December 1835	Lord Robert Manners	Conservative	Lord Charles Manners	Conservative	Death
North Northamptonshire	21 December 1835	Viscount Milton	Whig	Thomas Philip Maunsell	Conservative	Death
Devizes	25 November 1835	Wadham Locke	Whig	Thomas Bucknall-Estcourt	Conservative	Death
County Waterford	21 September 1835	Patrick Power	Whig	William Villiers-Stuart	Whig	Death
Dungarvan	21 September 1835	Michael O'Loghlen	Whig	Michael O'Loghlen	Whig	Attorney-General for Ireland
Cashel	4 September 1835	Louis Perrin	Whig	Stephen Woulfe	Whig	Resignation (Judge of the Irish Court of the King's Bench)
Belfast	27 August 1835	John McCance	Whig	George Dunbar	Conservative	Death
Oldham	8 July 1835	William Cobbett	Whig	John Frederick Lees	Conservative	Death
Ayrshire	3 July 1835	Richard Alexander Oswald	Whig	John Dunlop	Whig	Resignation
Bury St Edmunds	26 June 1835	Lord Charles FitzRoy	Whig	Lord Charles FitzRoy	Whig	Vice-Chamberlain of the Household
Kingston upon Hull	20 June 1835	David Carruthers	Conservative	Thomas Perronet Thompson	Whig	Death
Ipswich	19 June 1835	Fitzroy Kelly	Conservative	James Morrison	Whig	Void Election
Ipswich	19 June 1835	Robert Dundas	Conservative	Rigby Wason	Whig	Void Election
County Carlow	15 June 1835	Henry Bruen	Conservative	Nicholas Aylward Vigors	Whig	Void Election
County Carlow	15 June 1835	Nicholas Aylward Vigors	Whig	Henry Bruen	Conservative	By-election result reversed on petition
County Carlow	15 June 1835	Thomas Kavanagh	Conservative	Alexander Raphael	Whig	Void Election
County Carlow	15 June 1835	Alexander Raphael	Whig	Thomas Kavanagh	Conservative	By-election result reversed on petition
Tiverton	1 June 1835	James Kennedy	Whig	The Viscount Palmerston	Whig	Resignation to provide a seat for Palmerston
County Kildare	26 May 1835	Richard More O'Ferrall	Whig	Richard More O'Ferrall	Whig	Junior Lord of the Treasury
South Staffordshire	23 May 1835	Edward Littleton	Whig	Francis Goodricke	Conservative	Elevation to the peerage
Poole	21 May 1835	Sir John Byng	Whig	George Byng	Whig	Elevation to the peerage
Stroud	19 May 1835	Charles Richard Fox	Whig	Lord John Russell	Whig	Resignation to provide a seat for Russell
Malton	19 May 1835	Charles Pepys	Whig	Charles Pepys	Whig	First Commissioner of the Great Seal
Inverness-shire	15 May 1835	Charles Grant	Whig	Alexander William Chisholm	Conservative	Secretary of State for War and the Colonies and elevation to the peerage
Leith Burghs	8 May 1835	John Archibald Murray	Whig	John Archibald Murray	Whig	Lord Advocate
South Devon	7 May 1835	Lord John Russell	Whig	Montague Edmund Newcombe Parker	Conservative	Home Secretary
West Riding of Yorkshire	6 May 1835	Viscount Morpeth	Whig	Viscount Morpeth	Whig	Resignation pending appointment as Chief Secretary for Ireland
Dundee	6 May 1835	Sir Henry Parnell	Whig	Sir Henry Parnell	Whig	Treasurer of the Navy, Treasurer of the Ordnance and Paymaster of the Forces
Stirling Burghs	5 May 1835	Lord Dalmeny	Whig	Lord Dalmeny	Whig	Civil Lord of the Admiralty
North Essex	4 May 1835	Alexander Baring	Conservative	John Payne Elwes	Conservative	Elevation to the peerage
Dungarvan	4 May 1835	Michael O'Loghlen	Whig	Michael O'Loghlen	Whig	Solicitor-General for Ireland
Clackmannanshire and Kinross-shire	4 May 1835	Charles Adam	Whig	Charles Adam	Whig	First Naval Lord
Kirkcudbrightshire	2 May 1835	Robert Cutlar Fergusson	Whig	Robert Cutlar Fergusson	Whig	Judge Advocate General
Haddington Burghs	2 May 1835	Robert Steuart	Whig	Robert Steuart	Whig	Junior Lord of the Treasury
Elgin Burghs	2 May 1835	Andrew Leith Hay	Whig	Andrew Leith Hay	Whig	Clerk of the Ordnance
North Northumberland	1 May 1835	Viscount Howick	Whig	Viscount Howick	Whig	Secretary at War
Manchester	30 April 1835	Charles Poulett Thomson	Whig	Charles Poulett Thomson	Whig	President of the Board of Trade
Edinburgh	30 April 1835	John Campbell	Whig	John Campbell	Whig	Attorney General for England and Wales
Taunton	29 April 1835	Henry Labouchere	Whig	Henry Labouchere	Whig	Vice-President of the Board of Trade and Master of the Mint
Penryn and Falmouth	28 April 1835	Robert Monsey Rolfe	Whig	Robert Monsey Rolfe	Whig	Solicitor General for England and Wales
Cashel	28 April 1835	Louis Perrin	Whig	Louis Perrin	Whig	Attorney-General for Ireland
Sandwich	27 April 1835	Sir Edward Troubridge	Whig	Sir Edward Troubridge	Whig	Fourth Naval Lord
Newport (I.O.W.)	27 April 1835	William Henry Ord	Whig	William Henry Ord	Whig	Junior Lord of the Treasury
Cambridge	27 April 1835	Thomas Spring Rice	Whig	Thomas Spring Rice	Whig	Chancellor of the Exchequer
Berwick-upon-Tweed	27 April 1835	Rufane Shaw Donkin	Whig	Rufane Shaw Donkin	Whig	Surveyor-General of the Ordnance
Totnes	24 April 1835	Lord Seymour	Whig	Lord Seymour	Whig	Junior Lord of the Treasury
Nottingham	24 April 1835	Sir John Hobhouse	Whig	Sir John Hobhouse	Whig	President of the Board of Control
Drogheda	24 April 1835	Andrew Carew O'Dwyer	Whig	Andrew Carew O'Dwyer	Whig	Void Election
Drogheda	24 April 1835	Andrew Carew O'Dwyer	Whig	Randall Edward Plunkett	Conservative	By-Election result reversed on petition
North Nottinghamshire	31 March 1835	Viscount Lumley	Whig	Henry Gally Knight	Conservative	Succession to a peerage
Cambridge University	21 March 1835	Charles Manners-Sutton	Conservative	Charles Law	Conservative	Elevation to the peerage
Cardiff Boroughs	20 March 1835	John Iltyd Nicholl	Conservative	John Iltyd Nicholl	Conservative	Junior Lord of the Treasury
=== 11th Parliament (1832–1834) ===
By-election	Date	Former incumbent	Party	Winner	Party	Cause
Louth	24 December 1834 (Note: An uncontested by-election.)	Thomas FitzGerald	Repeal	Sir Patrick Bellew	Whig	Death
East Gloucestershire	14 August 1834	Sir Berkeley Guise	Whig	Christopher William Codrington	Tory	Death
Thetford	8 August 1834	Lord James FitzRoy	Whig	Earl of Euston	Whig	Death
Cirencester	6 August 1834	Lord Apsley	Tory	Lord Edward Somerset	Tory	Succession to a peerage
Sudbury	25 July 1834 (Note: Election decided by a tie-breaking vote from the returning officer. The defeated candidate challenged the result but Parliament was dissolved before the issue was settled.)	Michael Angelo Taylor	Whig	Edward Barnes	Tory	Death
Nottingham	25 July 1834	Viscount Duncannon	Whig	Sir John Hobhouse	Whig	Home Secretary (Note: Seat vacated on appointment to the office noted.) and elevation to the peerage
County Wexford	3 July 1834	Robert Carew	Whig	Cadwallader Waddy	Repeal	Elevation to the Irish peerage
Kirkcudbrightshire	3 July 1834	Robert Cutlar Fergusson	Whig	Robert Cutlar Fergusson	Whig	Judge Advocate General
Finsbury	2 July 1834	Robert Grant	Whig	Thomas Slingsby Duncombe	Whig	Resignation (Governor of Bombay)
Elgin Burghs	30 June 1834	Andrew Leith Hay	Whig	Andrew Leith Hay	Whig	Clerk of the Ordnance
County Fermanagh	27 June 1834	Mervyn Archdall	Tory	Mervyn Edward Archdale	Tory	Resignation
Chatham	26 June 1834	William Leader Maberly	Whig	George Byng	Whig	Resignation (Commissioner of Customs)
Edinburgh	23 June 1834	James Abercromby	Whig	James Abercromby	Whig	Master of the Mint
Cambridge	13 June 1834	Thomas Spring Rice	Whig	Thomas Spring Rice	Whig	Secretary of State for War and the Colonies
Leith Burghs	2 June 1834	John Archibald Murray	Whig	John Archibald Murray	Whig	Lord Advocate
Edinburgh	2 June 1834	Francis Jeffrey	Whig	Sir John Campbell	Whig	Resignation (Judge of the Court of Session)
North Derbyshire	27 May 1834	Lord Cavendish of Keighley	Whig	Lord George Cavendish	Whig	Succession to a peerage
County Monaghan	17 May 1834	Cadwallader Blayney	Tory	Henry Westenra	Whig	Succession to an Irish peerage
County Monaghan	17 May 1834	Henry Westenra	Whig	Edward Lucas	Tory	By-Election result reversed on petition
Dungarvan	16 May 1834	Ebenezer Jacob	Whig	Ebenezer Jacob	Whig	Void By-Election
Wells	5 May 1834	Norman Lamont	Whig	Nicholas Ridley-Colborne	Whig	Death
Perthshire	5 May 1834	Earl of Ormelie	Whig	George Murray	Tory	Succession to a peerage
Paisley	24 March 1834	Sir John Maxwell	Whig	Daniel Keyte Sandford	Whig	Resignation
Thirsk	21 March 1834	Robert Frankland	Whig	Samuel Crompton	Whig	Resignation
Malton	4 March 1834	Charles Pepys	Whig	Charles Pepys	Whig	Solicitor General for England and Wales
Ayr Burghs	3 March 1834	Thomas Francis Kennedy	Whig	Lord Patrick Crichton-Stuart	Whig	Resignation
Dudley	28 February 1834	John Campbell	Whig	Thomas Hawkes	Tory	Attorney General for England and Wales
Totnes	17 February 1834	James Cornish	Whig	Lord Seymour	Whig	Resignation
Leeds	17 February 1834	Thomas Babington Macaulay	Whig	Edward Baines	Whig	Resignation
Kendal	17 February 1834	James Brougham	Whig	John Foster-Barham	Whig	Death
Devizes	17 February 1834	Montague Gore	Whig	Philip Charles Durham	Tory	Resignation
Dungarvan	15 February 1834	George Lamb	Whig	Ebenezer Jacob	Whig	Death
East Somerset	3 February 1834	William Papwell Brigstocke	Whig	William Miles	Tory	Death
Berwickshire	13 January 1834	Charles Albany Marjoribanks	Whig	Sir Hugh Purves-Hume-Campbell	Tory	Death
Huddersfield	9 January 1834	Lewis Fenton	Whig	John Blackburne	Whig	Death
Morpeth	31 December 1833	Frederick George Howard	Whig	Edward George Granville Howard	Whig	Death
York	11 November 1833	Samuel Adlam Bayntun	Tory	Thomas Dundas	Whig	Death
Buteshire	4 September 1833	Charles Stuart	Tory	Sir William Rae	Tory	Resignation
City of London	12 August 1833	Sir John Key	Whig	William Crawford	Whig	Resignation
South Staffordshire	7 June 1833	Edward Littleton	Whig	Edward Littleton	Whig	Chief Secretary for Ireland
Stroud	27 May 1833	David Ricardo	Whig	George Julius Poulett Scrope	Whig	Resignation
Tiverton	24 May 1833	James Kennedy	Whig	James Kennedy	Whig	Void Election
Inverness Burghs	17 May 1833	John Baillie	Tory	Charles Lennox Cumming Bruce	Tory	Death
West Worcestershire	16 May 1833	Thomas Foley	Whig	Henry Winnington	Whig	Succession to a peerage
Westminster	11 May 1833	Sir John Hobhouse	Whig	George de Lacy Evans	Whig	Seeks re-election after resigning from the ministry
Dundee	17 April 1833	George Kinloch	Whig	Sir Henry Parnell	Whig	Death
North Lancashire	12 April 1833	Edward Stanley	Whig	Edward Stanley	Whig	Secretary of State for War and the Colonies
Coventry	12 April 1833	Edward Ellice	Whig	Edward Ellice	Whig	Secretary at War
Gloucester	9 April 1833	Maurice Berkeley	Whig	Henry Thomas Hope	Tory	Fourth Naval Lord
Montgomery Boroughs	8 April 1833	David Pugh	Tory	John Edwards	Whig	Void Election
Westminster	4 April 1833	Sir John Hobhouse	Whig	Sir John Hobhouse	Whig	Chief Secretary for Ireland
Sunderland	4 April 1833	George Barrington	Whig	William Thompson	Tory	Resignation
West Cumberland	25 March 1833	Viscount Lowther	Tory	Samuel Irton	Tory	Chose to sit for Westmorland
Marylebone	20 March 1833	Edward Portman	Whig	Samuel Whalley	Whig	Resignation
Oxford	18 March 1833	Thomas Stonor	Whig	William Hughes Hughes	Whig	Void Election
North Northamptonshire	9 March 1833	Viscount Milton	Whig	Viscount Milton	Whig	Succession to a peerage
Malton	8 March 1833	Viscount Milton	Whig	John Charles Ramsden	Whig	Resignation to contest North Northamptonshire
Dover	7 March 1833	Charles Poulett Thomson	Whig	John Halcomb	Tory	Chose to sit for Manchester
City of London	27 February 1833	Robert Waithman	Whig	George Lyall	Tory	Death
