= Ambrose Hussey =

British politician

Member of Parliament for Salisbury
- In office 4 May 1843 – 25 January 1847 Serving with John Campbell-Wyndham (Nov 1843–1847); Wadham Wyndham (May 1843–Nov 1843)
- Preceded by: William Bird Brodie; Wadham Wyndham
- Succeeded by: William Chaplin; John Campbell-Wyndham

Personal details
- Born: 1807
- Died: 21 March 1849 (aged 42)
- Party: Conservative

Ambrose Hussey (1807 – 21 March 1849) was a British Conservative politician.

Hussey was elected Conservative Member of Parliament for Salisbury at a by-election in 1843—caused by the resignation of William Bird Brodie—and held the seat until 1847 when he too resigned by accepting the office of Steward of the Chiltern Hundreds.

Parliament of the United Kingdom
Preceded by William Bird Brodie; Wadham Wyndham	Member of Parliament for Salisbury; 1843–1847; With: John Campbell-Wyndham (Nov 1843–1847); Wadham Wyndham (May 1843–Nov 1843)	Succeeded by William Chaplin; John Campbell-Wyndham
