= 1843 Salisbury by-election =

There were two by-elections for the constituency of Salisbury in 1843:

- May 1843 Salisbury by-election, caused by the resignation of William Bird Brodie.
- November 1843 Salisbury by-election, caused by the death of Wadham Wyndham.
