= Duncombe Pleydell-Bouverie =

British Royal Navy admiral (1780–1850)

Admiral The Honourable Duncombe Pleydell-Bouverie

Member of Parliament for Salisbury
- In office 1828-1832; 1833-1835

Member of Parliament for Downton
- In office 1806–1807

Personal details
- Born: 28 June 1780
- Died: 5 November 1850 (aged 70)
- Party: Whig
- Spouse: Louisa May (m. 1809)
- Parent: Jacob Pleydell-Bouverie (father)
- Relatives: William Pleydell-Bouverie (brother); Philip Pleydell-Bouverie (brother); Anthony Duncombe (grandfather); William Bouverie (grandfather)
- Military career
- Branch: Royal Navy
- Rank: Admiral
- Commands: HMS Penguin; HMS Braave; HMS Medusa; HMS Windsor Castle; HMS Victory

Admiral Duncombe Pleydell-Bouverie (28 June 1780 – 5 November 1850), was a British Royal Navy officer and Whig politician.

== Biography ==
Pleydell-Bouverie was the second son of Jacob Pleydell-Bouverie, 2nd Earl of Radnor, and the Honourable Anne Duncombe, daughter of Anthony Duncombe, 1st Baron Feversham. William Pleydell-Bouverie, 3rd Earl of Radnor, was his elder brother.

Pleydell-Bouverie served in the Royal Navy, entering the Academy at Portsmouth in 1793. He was promoted to Lieutenant on 16 February 1799 and to Commander on 14 February 1801. His first command was HMS Penguin from 28 August. Bouverie was promoted to post captain in HMS Braave on 2 April 1802. He commanded several ships in various duties until being appointed to HMS Medusa on 20 February 1806. He held this command for seven years, taking part in the operations in the Río de la Plata (1806-7) including the blockade and siege of Montevideo.

In November 1806, Medusa apprehended the American trading brig Harry and Jane, and pressed a number of its crew into service with the Royal Navy. Included in these "volunteers" was an English sailor, George Thomas, who was a skilled navigator. Bouverie rapidly promoted him, and he went on to become a distinguished hydrographic surveyor. Bouverie, supported by Alexander Dalrymple Hydrographer of the Navy, published a report with sailing directions for the Río de la Plata based on his own observations and surveys.

Upon returning from South America, Bouverie continued to be active in the war with France and Spain, being noted particularly for his actions in support of the anti-French forces in the north of Spain.

From 1828 to 1831 he commanded HMS Windsor Castle, was promoted to Rear-Admiral on 10 January 1837, and to Vice-Admiral on 9 November 1846.

He also sat as Member of Parliament for Downton between 1806 and 1807 and for Salisbury between 1828 and 1832 and again from 1833 to 1835. He is not recorded as having ever spoken in the House of Commons. He hoisted his flag in HMS Victory as Port Admiral at Portsmouth in 1837.

Pleydell-Bouverie married Louisa, daughter of Joseph May, in 1809. He died in November 1850, aged 70.

== Citations ==
Parliament of the United Kingdom
Preceded by The Lord de Blaquiere; Viscount Marsham	Member of Parliament for Downton; 1806–1807; With: Hon. Bartholomew Bouverie	Succeeded by Hon. Bartholomew Bouverie; Sir Thomas Plumer
Preceded by Viscount Folkestone; Wadham Wyndham	Member of Parliament for Salisbury; 1828–1832; With: Wadham Wyndham	Succeeded by Wadham Wyndham; William Bird Brodie
Preceded by Wadham Wyndham; William Bird Brodie	Member of Parliament for Salisbury; 1833–1835; With: William Bird Brodie	Succeeded by William Bird Brodie; Wadham Wyndham
