= William Pleydell-Bouverie, 3rd Earl of Radnor =

British politician

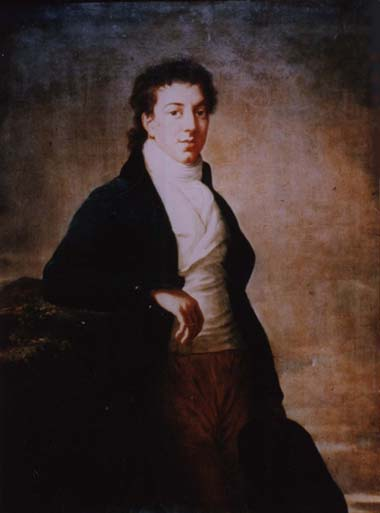
- The 3rd Earl of Radnor

Member of Parliament for Salisbury
- In office 1802–1828

Member of Parliament for Downton
- In office 1801–1802; 1818–1819

Personal details
- Born: 11 May 1779
- Died: 9 April 1869 (aged 89)
- Spouse(s): Catherine Pelham-Clinton (m. 1800; died 1804) Judith St John-Mildmay (m. 1814)
- Children: 9, including Jacob, Edward and Mary
- Parent: Jacob Playdell-Bouverie (father)
- Relatives: Duncombe Pleydell-Bouverie (brother); Philip Pleydell-Bouverie (brother); William Bouverie (grandfather); Anthony Duncombe (grandfather)
- Education: University of Edinburgh; Brasenose College, Oxford
- Military career
- Rank: Lieutenant-Colonel
- Units: Royal Berkshire Militia; Berkshire Yeomanry

William Pleydell-Bouverie, 3rd Earl of Radnor (11 May 1779 – 9 April 1869), styled Viscount Folkestone until 1828, was the son of Jacob Pleydell-Bouverie, 2nd Earl of Radnor and the Hon. Anne Duncombe.

== Family ==
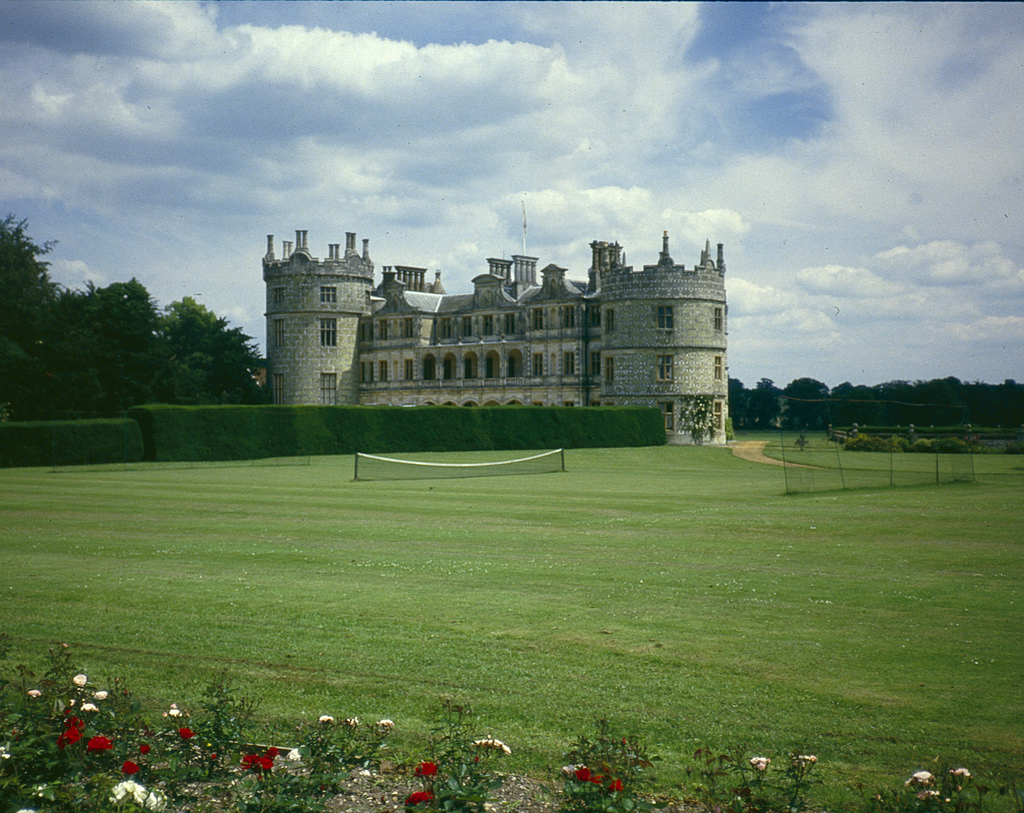
Longford Castle - seat of the Earls of Radnor

After studying at the University of Edinburgh and Brasenose College, Oxford, and after a tour of Europe, Folkestone settled at Coleshill, in Berkshire, which remained his favourite home for the rest of his life.

In October 1800, he married Lady Catherine Pelham-Clinton, the presumptive heir to the estates of the Duke of Newcastle. Her first cousin, Lord Castlereagh, was one of the witnesses. Lady Folkestone died after giving birth to a stillborn daughter in 1804, but their only surviving child succeeded as the Pelham-Clinton heir until the Duchess of Newcastle gave birth to a son in 1811.

== Career ==
=== Advanced radical ===
Folkestone first entered the House of Commons for his father's pocket borough of Downton in 1801 and switched to Salisbury in 1802. In Parliament, he immediately became a strong opponent of the ministry of Henry Addington and specifically of Addington's negotiations for peace with France.

When Addington's ministry fell in April 1804, Folkestone continued in opposition to William Pitt the Younger. By now he was close to the radical pamphleteer William Cobbett with whom he campaigned against corruption in government through the impeachment of Lord Melville and the prosecution of Lord Wellesley for his conduct as governor-general of India. The climax of their campaign was the attempt to impeach the commander-in-chief, the Duke of York, whose former mistress, Mary Anne Clarke, had been selling commissions.

By the time of the Duke's resignation in March 1809, Folkestone was emerging as the leader of the younger radicals in the Commons and featured in several of James Gillray's cartoons. However, in the summer of 1810, when Clarke published some of his letters to her that showed the easy intimacy that had existed between them, his reputation and that of his fellow radicals was seriously compromised.

It was some years before Folkestone returned to take a leading role in the opposition to the government of Lord Liverpool. However, by 1816, with increasing distress in the country, he was back by challenging the government's plans to raise a large standing army to suppress dissent and to continue with the income tax to pay for it and opposing the suspension of the Habeas Corpus Act and the introduction of the Seditious Meetings Act.

He was, however, a lonely figure in the Commons. As one member wrote, "there is literally no one but Folkestone who comes into the line and fights".

=== Parliamentary reform ===
The plight of the rural and urban poor, and the repressive measures taken against them by the government, drove Folkestone finally in 1821 to publicly advocate a reform of parliament. That and the question of Catholic emancipation occupied him during the somnolent parliamentary years of the 1820s. On 27 January 1828, he succeeded his father as Earl of Radnor and continued his opposition to the Tories in the Lords. At the general election of August 1830, there was radical pressure on him to bring in William Cobbett for Downton, which was in his gift, but Radnor feared alienating the conservative Whigs and thus jeopardising the cause of parliamentary reform. Cobbett was disappointed, but they remained close friends and allies, and Radnor was delighted when Cobbett was finally returned for Oldham in the election of 1832. The accession of the 'semi-Tory', Lord Grey, in November 1830, did not excite him. He still wanted to see universal suffrage and a secret ballot, but he was prepared to support Grey's measure to achieve some sort of reform, albeit a very conservative one. He spoke powerfully on behalf of the bill in the Lords though its passing resulted in the loss of his two seats at Downton and of his family's interest in Salisbury.

=== The Poor Law ===
Radnor's activity during the 1830s was more controversial. He was a lifelong student of political economy and was deeply influenced by the writings of Adam Smith, Jeremy Bentham, Thomas Robert Malthus and David Ricardo. Malthus and Ricardo were both hostile to the old system of outdoor relief for the poor, and their ideas were behind the government's Poor Law Amendment Bill, which was introduced in the Commons in April 1834 and speedily passed into law. Outdoor relief was to be abolished, and workhouses to be built to house the poor. Much to the consternation of Cobbett and his radical admirers, Radnor was a strong advocate of the new system.

=== Free trade ===
It was his readings in political economy that underpinned his final campaign during the 1840s. For many years, tariffs had been imposed on grain imports to protect British farmers from foreign competition, which had the effect of artificially inflating food prices in the interests of landlords. For some years, Radnor had been advocating the repeal of all grain duties and had made his acceptance of office in Lord Grey's government in 1834 dependent on repeal. As usual, his was a lonely voice in the House of Lords. He remained the only peer who strongly supported repeal throughout the debates that raged between 1839 and 1846 and was accused of inviting the destruction of landed property and of bringing down the civil and religious institutions of the state. In the summer of 1843, he encouraged the Scottish economist James Wilson to establish a journal that would campaign for free trade, The Economist. He contributed generously in its difficult early years and wrote several articles for it on the subject of free trade. In November 1843, at a bye-election in Salisbury, Radnor's younger son by his second marriage, Edward Pleydell-Bouverie, stood unsuccessfully with the support of the major players in the Anti-Corn Law League. Radnor's eldest grandson, Alfred Buckley, wrote to his mother from Eton commiserating on 'Ned's defeat' but was delighted that she had met Richard Cobden and John Bright and hoped that she would 'improve her acquaintance' with them. With the final repeal of the Corn Laws in June 1846, Radnor, now 67, began to withdraw from public life and spent the remainder of his long life on his estate at Coleshill.

== Other interests ==
His father was Lord Lieutenant of Berkshire, and he was appointed a deputy lieutenant on 22 November 1801. On 31 March 1803, he was commissioned by his father as a captain in the Royal Berkshire Militia. He resigned on 1 June 1805 having transferred to the Berkshire Yeomanry on 14 March. He returned to the Royal Berkshire Militia as its lieutenant-colonel from 9 December 1812 to August 1817. On 9 February 1828, he succeeded his father as Recorder of Salisbury. Radnor was made a deputy lieutenant of Wiltshire on 9 August 1839 and a vice-lieutenant of the county on 17 August 1839.

In 1828, he built a toll road providing an easy route between Folkestone Harbour and Sandgate. The original toll house remains within the Lower Leas Coastal Park. On either side of the toll road, land was cultivated and grazed. Old field boundaries are still used in the park, and the 'Cow Path' is a reminder of the drove route from The Leas.

Radnor served as governor of the French Hospital at the time of its move from Finsbury to the new and imposing hospital building in Victoria Park, Hackney, which was designed by Robert Lewis Roumieu. Successive Earls of Radnor were governors of the hospital from the eighteenth century to 2015.

== Marriage and issue ==
He married, firstly, Lady Catherine Pelham-Clinton (d. 17 May 1804), only surviving child of Henry Pelham-Clinton, Earl of Lincoln, eldest son & heir of Henry Pelham-Clinton, 2nd Duke of Newcastle on 2 October 1800 and had two children:

- Lady Catherine Pleydell-Bouverie (8 July 1801 – 21 February 1875), married Edward Pery Buckley & had issue
- Hon. Frances Ann Pleydell-Bouverie (b. & d. 2 May 1804)

He married, secondly, Judith Anne St John-Mildmay, daughter of Sir Henry St John-Mildmay, 3rd Baronet on 24 May 1814 and had six children:

- Jacob Pleydell-Bouverie, 4th Earl of Radnor (18 September 1815 – 11 March 1889)
- Hon. Ann Maria Pleydell-Bouverie (16 January 1817 – 18 July 1825)
- Rt. Hon. Edward Pleydell-Bouverie (26 April 1818 – 16 December 1889)
- Lady Jane Harriet Pleydell-Bouverie (April 1819 – 7 June 1903), married William Ellice
- Lady Mary Pleydell-Bouverie (22 December 1825 – 24 October 1900), married James Wilde, 1st Baron Penzance
- a stillborn son (26 June 1832)

== Coat of arms ==
Coat of arms of William Pleydell-Bouverie, 3rd Earl of Radnor
Coronet A coronet of an Earl Crest A demi-eagle with two heads displayed sable, ducally gorged or, and charged on the breast with a cross crosslet argent. Escutcheon Quarterly: 1st and 4th, per fesse or and argent, an eagle displayed, with two heads sable, on the breast an escutcheon gules, charged with a bend vair (Bouverie); 2nd and 3rd, argent a bend gules, guttée d’eau between two ravens sable, a chief checky, or and sable (Pleydell). Supporters Two eagles reguardant, wings elevated sable, ducally gorged or, each charged on the breast with a cross crosslet argent. Motto Patria cara carior libertas. (My country is dear, liberty is dearer.)

Parliament of the United Kingdom
Preceded by Sir William Scott; Hon. Edward Bouverie	Member of Parliament for Downton; 1801–1802; With: Hon. Edward Bouverie	Succeeded by Hon. Edward Bouverie; Hon. John Ward
Preceded by Hon. William Henry Bouverie; William Hussey	Member of Parliament for Salisbury; 1802–1828; With: William Hussey 1802–1813; George Purefoy-Jervoise 1813–1818; Wadham Wyndham 1818–1828	Succeeded by Wadham Wyndham; Hon. Duncombe Pleydell-Bouverie
Preceded by Sir Thomas Brooke-Pechell; Edward Golding	Member of Parliament for Downton; 1818–1819; With: Sir William Scott	Succeeded by Hon. Bartholomew Bouverie; Sir Thomas Brooke-Pechell
Peerage of Great Britain
Preceded by Jacob Bouverie	Earl of Radnor; 1828–1869	Succeeded by Jacob Pleydell-Bouverie
