= Jacob Pleydell-Bouverie, 4th Earl of Radnor =

British nobleman and army officer

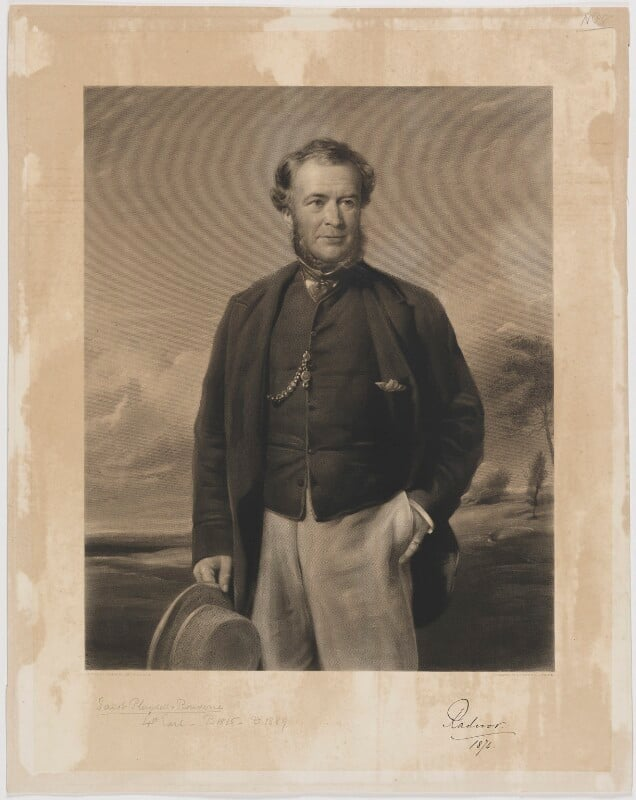

High Sheriff of Wiltshire
- In office 1846

Personal details
- Born: 18 September 1815
- Died: 11 March 1889 (aged 73)
- Spouse: Mary Grimston (m. 1840)
- Children: 12, including William
- Parent: William Pleydell-Bouverie (father)
- Relatives: Edward Pleydell-Bouverie (brother); Mary Playdell-Bouverie (sister); Jacob Playdell-Bouverie (grandfather); Henry Pelham-Clinton (grandfather)
- Education: Christ Church, Oxford
- Military career
- Rank: Lieutenant
- Unit: Royal Wiltshire Regiment of Yeomanry

Jacob Pleydell-Bouverie, 4th Earl of Radnor (18 September 1815 – 11 March 1889) was a British nobleman and army officer.

He was the son of William Pleydell-Bouverie, 3rd Earl of Radnor and Judith Anne St John-Mildmay. He was styled Viscount Folkestone from 1828 until 1869.

== Biography ==
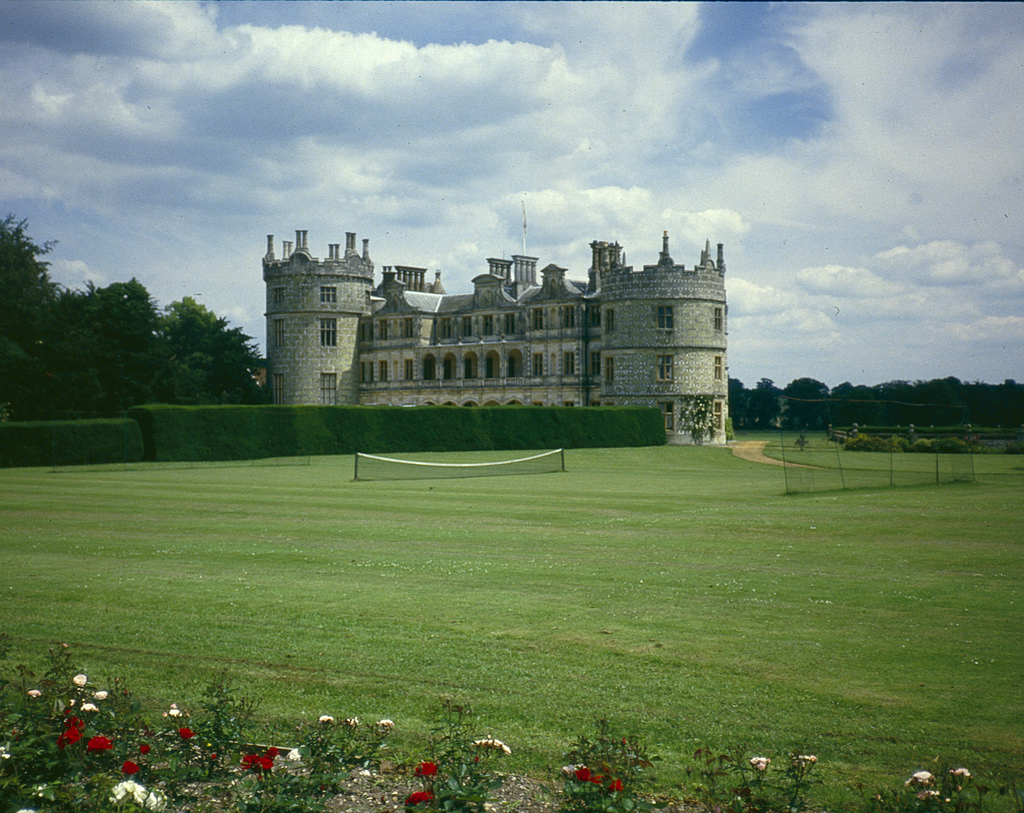
Longford Castle, seat of the Earls of Radnor

Folkestone was educated at Harrow and Christ Church, Oxford. On 2 October 1837, he was commissioned a cornet in the Salisbury Troop of the Royal Wiltshire Regiment of Yeomanry. He was a lieutenant in the Regiment from 20 May 1840 to April 1847.

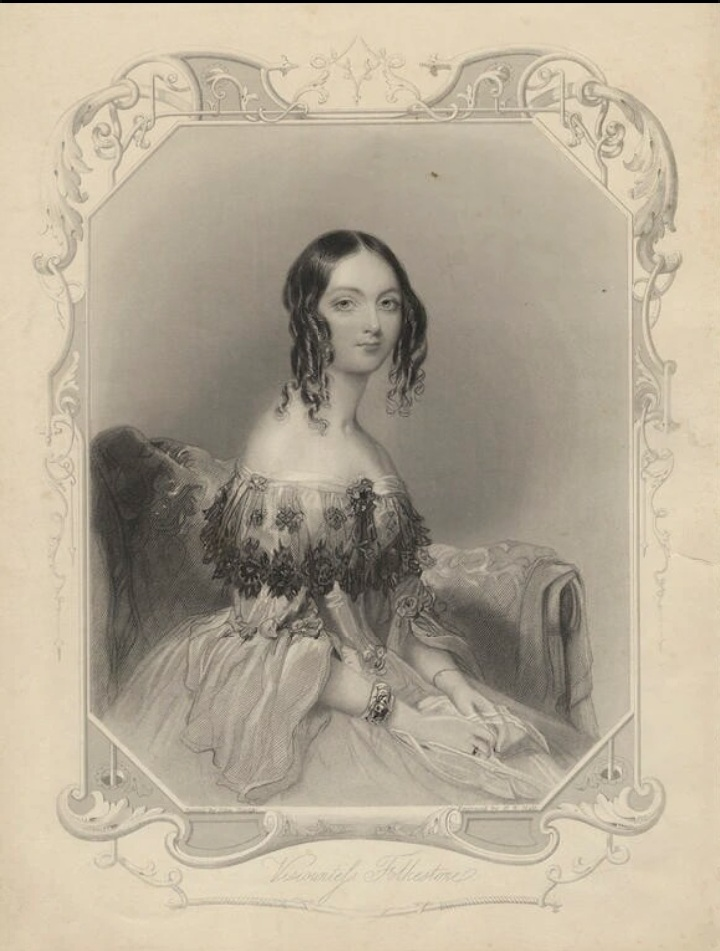
His wife, Lady Mary Grimston

He married Lady Mary Augusta Frederica Grimston, daughter of James Grimston, 1st Earl of Verulam, on 3 October 1840. She was one of the train-bearers to Queen Victoria at the 1838 coronation.

They had twelve children:

- William Pleydell-Bouverie, 5th Earl of Radnor (19 June 1841 – 3 June 1900)
- Hon. Duncombe Pleydell-Bouverie (10 October 1842 – 25 January 1909), married Maria Eleanor Hulse, daughter of Sir Edward Hulse, 5th Baronet. They had a son and two daughters, one of them the potter Katherine Pleydell-Bouverie.
- Rev. Hon. Bertrand Pleydell-Bouverie (23 April 1845 – 7 November 1926), married Lady Constance Jane Nelson, daughter of Horatio Nelson, 3rd Earl Nelson
- Lt.-Col. Hon. John Pleydell-Bouverie (18 July 1846 – 28 March 1925), married Grace Malaby, daughter of Lt.-Gen. Robert Malaby, and had a daughter
- Lady Anne Pleydell-Bouverie (c.1847 – 18 September 1915), married Archibald Alexander Speirs
- Hon. Mark Pleydell-Bouverie (27 September 1851 – 17 February 1895)
- Hon. Kenelm Pleydell-Bouverie (29 March 1852 – 11 July 1921), married Evelyn Maitland-Makgill-Crichton and had issue
- Lady Margaret Pleydell-Bouverie (c.1853 – 5 January 1924), married David Maitland-Makgill-Crichton and had issue
- Lady Edith Pleydell-Bouverie (c.1855 – 28 December 1922), married Charles Cotes, son of Rev. Charles Grey Cotes (maternal grandson of George Grey, 5th Earl of Stamford and Fanny Henrietta Pigot (daughter of Sir George Pigot, 3rd Baronet)
- Hon. Christopher Pleydell-Bouverie (30 December 1856 – 22 March 1892)
- Hon. Frank Pleydell-Bouverie (19 April 1858 – 15 July 1909)
- Lady Gertrude Pleydell-Bouverie (19 April 1858 – 11 January 1940), married Arthur Monckton and had issue.

Folkestone was High Sheriff of Wiltshire for 1846 and was appointed a deputy lieutenant of Berkshire on 2 May 1855. He succeeded his father as Earl of Radnor in 1869 and was appointed Lord Lieutenant of Wiltshire in 1878.

Radnor served as governor of the French Hospital, at that time in London. Successive Earls of Radnor were governors of the hospital from the eighteenth century to 2015.

== Coat of arms ==
Coat of arms of Jacob Pleydell-Bouverie, 4th Earl of Radnor
Coronet A coronet of an Earl Crest A demi-eagle with two heads displayed sable, ducally gorged or, and charged on the breast with a cross crosslet argent. Escutcheon Quarterly: 1st and 4th, per fesse or and argent, an eagle displayed, with two heads sable, on the breast an escutcheon gules, charged with a bend vair (Bouverie); 2nd and 3rd, argent a bend gules, guttée d’eau between two ravens sable, a chief checky, or and sable (Pleydell). Supporters Two eagles reguardant, wings elevated sable, ducally gorged or, each charged on the breast with a cross crosslet argent. Motto Patria cara carior libertas. (My country is dear, liberty is dearer.)

Honorary titles
Preceded by Wade Browne	High Sheriff of Wiltshire; 1846	Succeeded by Wadham Locke
Preceded by The Marquess of Ailesbury	Lord Lieutenant of Wiltshire; 1878–1889	Succeeded by The Marquess of Bath
Peerage of Great Britain
Preceded by William Pleydell-Bouverie	Earl of Radnor; 1869–1889	Succeeded by William Pleydell-Bouverie
