= Rosa 'Jeanie Deans' =

Rose cultivar

- Origin: Sir James Plaisted Wilde (1895)

Rosa 'Jeanie Deans' is a scarlet-crimson hybrid rubiginosa rose cultivar created by Sir James Plaisted Wilde, who became Lord Penzance, in 1869. It is named after Jeanie Deans, the heroine of Scott's novel The Heart of Midlothian.

Wilde was a judge of the Court of Probate and Divorce, and retired in 1872, but accepted the post of Dean of Arches in 1875, a position he kept on until the year of his death. His main residence was Eashing Park in Godalming, Surrey in the mild south of England. There he relaxed from the stresses of judicial duties by enjoying his gardens. Apparently his roses afforded him great enjoyment because he started to hybridize then, and grow them from seed. He was keen on Sir Walter Scott and his novels and named many of his hybrid roses after characters in Scott's novels.

The 'Jeanie Deans' rose was introduced in 1895. It is known as a hybrid rubiginosa and was apparently a hybrid of R. eglanteria with something else. It is described as being profuse, scarlet-crimson, with semi-double flowers. It is available commercially.
