= Gertrude Fenton =

English writer

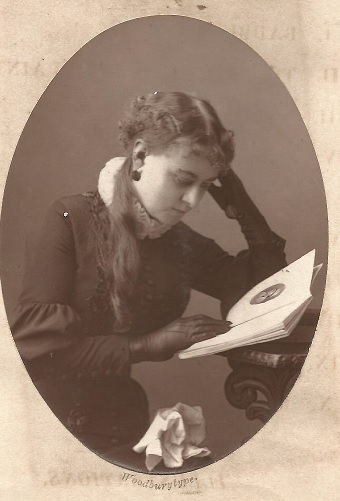
- Gertrude Fenton woodburytype c.1868
- Born: Annie Maria Gertrude Thomas; 1841; Hampton Wick, Middlesex, United Kingdom
- Died: 11 April 1884 (aged 42–43); Isle of Wight, Hampshire
- Resting place: Carisbrooke cemetery, Isle of Wight
- Occupations: writer, magazine editor
- Spouse: Arthur Fenton
- Writing career
- Genre: Fiction
- Notable works: Cora: or, The Romance of Three Years (1869), Carisbrooke magazine (1880/81)
- Literary movement: Romanticism

Gertrude Fenton (1841 – April 11, 1884), was an English novelist and magazine editor. She specialised in writing popular romantic fiction and published four novels between 1869 and 1871. Her most popular novel was her first Cora; or, The Romance of Three Years: A Novel.

== Life ==
Annie Maria Gertrude Thomas, professionally known as Gertrude Fenton was born at Hampton Wick in Middlesex in 1841. (Note: It is likely that her father William Lewis Thomas did not register her birth, registration not being a requirement at the time of her birth so her exact birthdate is not presently known.) She was the daughter of a London based barrister William Lewis Thomas and his wife Ann Hellier. Her formative years were spent in Chelsea and in 1865 she married Arthur Fenton, the son of John Fenton, former MP for Rochdale and half brother of the pioneer war photographer Roger Fenton (1819-1869). (Note: They were married at Holy Trinity Brompton church on 18 April 1864. The banns records and marriage certificate state her name as Annette Marie Gertrude Thomas.) The young couple are recorded in 1871 census as living at All Saints Thwaite near Aylsham in Norfolk and in the 1881 census in Freshwater on the Isle of Wight, Hampshire.

Whilst living on the Isle of Wight she and her husband published a literary periodical The Carisbrooke Magazine. Contributors included a mixture of less well known and established writers such as Theo Gift complemented by articles on famous personalities that included Henry Irving, the stage actor. The magazine ran from 1880 into 1881 by when Fenton was in poor health. Gertrude Fenton died on April 11, 1884 of cerebrovascular and hepatic disease and was interred at Carisbrooke Cemetery.

== Literary works ==
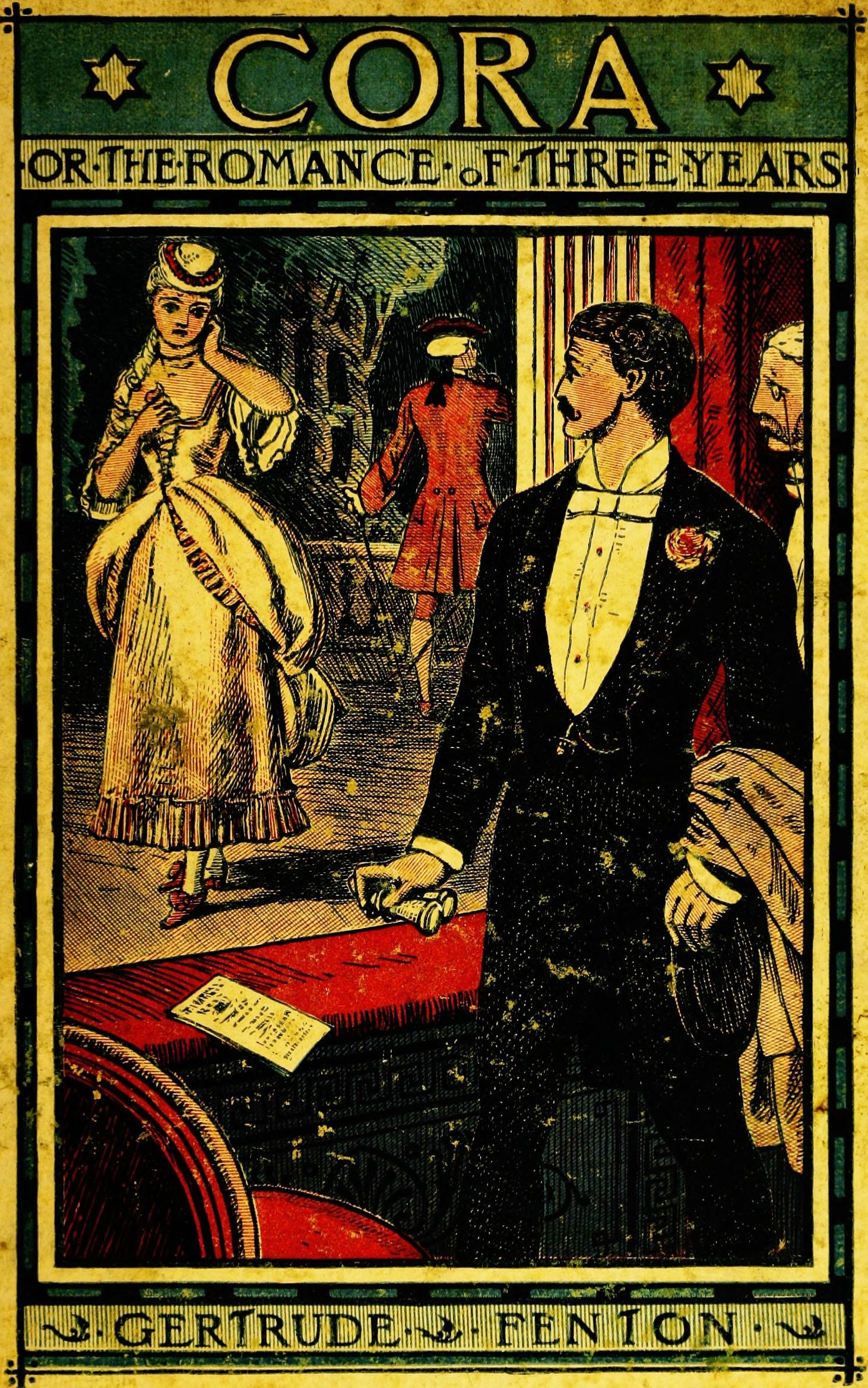

Gertrude Fenton wrote four romantic novels published between 1869 and 1871 and a novelette in 1873 beginning with Cora; or, The Romance of Three Years, her most successful novel and ending with Is Lady Clara Dead? They are examples of sensation fiction that flourished during the mid-Victorian era. Published by F.Enos Arnold of London (Note: Enos Arnold 's career as a publisher was short and confined to the period of a few years around 1870. He was born in Dorchester, Dorset in 1838. On the 1871 Census return he was living in Lewisham, Kent with his family and describes himself as a 'general publisher' By 1881 he appears to have left publishing and is listed in the Census as a journalist. He died in Westminster on 15 April 1917) as a single volume yellow-back Cora was marketed as entertaining reading and often sold at railway stations. It included a brightly coloured cover, printed by chromoxylography and was aimed at a predominately young female class of readers. It was reviewed by the St. James' Magazine and United Empire Review who thought the story far-fetched but entertaining.

Cora was successful enough for the publisher F. E. Arnold to publish three further novels in 1871. The Wicked Lady which is partly set in a mental institution was adapted for the stage by the playwright and actor, Brandon Ellis who toured with it in 1874 appearing at Theatre Royal in Huddersfield. Revenge another romance was printed with a maroon cover embossed with the motif, St.James Series and was, at least in presentation, an attempt to distance Gertrude Fenton from the garish yellow-backs. The Spectator Literary Review provided a favourable review calling Revenge a 'thrilling romance'.

== Bibliography ==
- Cora; or, The Romance of Three Years: A Novel. 1 vol. F.Enos Arnold, London (1869)
- A Wicked Woman: A Novel. 1 vol. F. Enos Arnold, London (1871)
- Revenge. 1 vol. F. Enos Arnold, London (1871)
- Is Lady Clara Dead?: A Novel. 3 vols. F.Enos Arnold, London (1871)
- Ruth’s Sacrifice: a Novelette in Six Chapters. St.James’ Magazine and United Empire Review, Holiday Annual (1873)
