= Alby with Thwaite =

Civil parish in Norfolk, England

Coordinates: 52.849°N 1.282°E

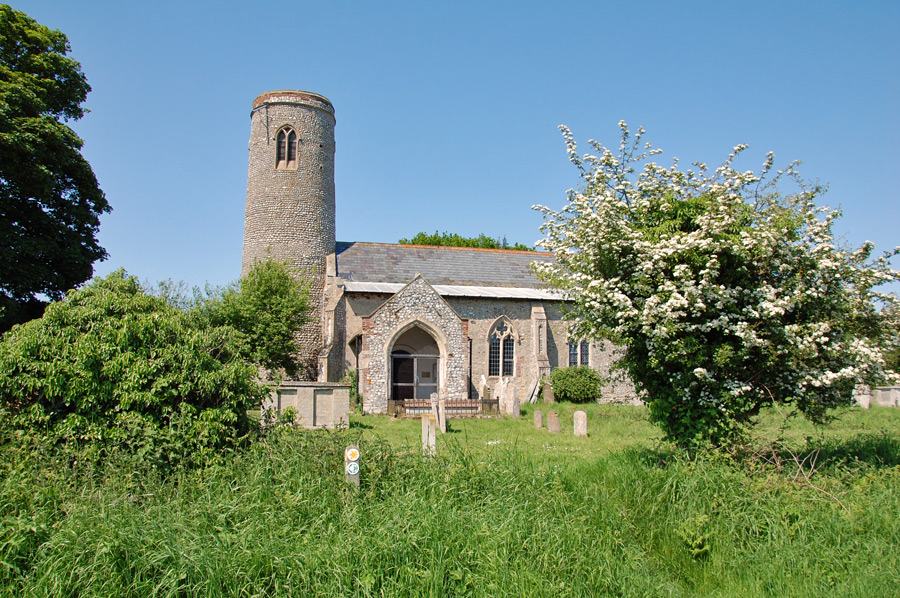
- All Saints’ Parish Church, Thwaite

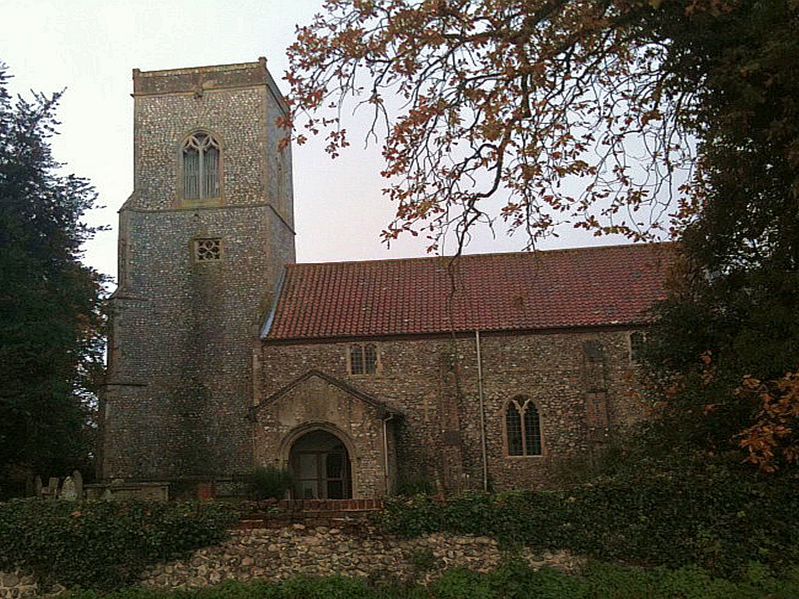
- St. Ethelbert's, Alby

- Location within Norfolk
- Area: 5.81 km^{2} (2.24 sq mi)
- Population: 245 (parish, 2011 census)
  - Density: 42/km^{2} (110/sq mi)
- OS grid reference: TG196340
  - London: 132 miles
- Civil parish: Alby with Thwaite
- District: North Norfolk
- Shire county: Norfolk
- Region: East
- Country: England
- Sovereign state: United Kingdom
- Post town: NORWICH
- Postcode district: NR11
- Dialling code: 01263
- Police: Norfolk
- Fire: Norfolk
- Ambulance: East of England
- UK Parliament: North Norfolk

Alby with Thwaite is a civil parish in the English county of Norfolk. The parish straddles the A140 road around 6 miles (9.7 km) south of Cromer and 19 miles (31 km) north of Norwich. It includes the settlements of Alby and Thwaite.

== Geography ==
Alby with Thwaite has an area of 5.81 square kilometres (2.24 sq mi) and in the 2001 census had a population of 223 in 86 households, the population increasing to 245 at the 2011 Census. For the purposes of local government, the parish falls within the district of North Norfolk.

The church at the hamlet of Thwaite All Saints, is one of 124 existing round-tower churches in Norfolk. Other features of interest are the 1624 pulpit and the 1824 Sunday school room situated north of the chancel. The novelist Gertrude Fenton lived at the White House in All Saints’ Thwaite with her husband Arthur in the 1870s.
