= Henry Wyndham =

Henry Wyndham may refer to:

- Henry Penruddocke Wyndham (1736–1819), British politician and topographer
- Henry Wyndham, 2nd Baron Leconfield (1830–1901), British peer
- Henry Wyndham (British Army officer) (1790–1860), MP for Cockermouth 1852–1857, for West Cumberland 1857–1860
