= Britannia (1788 ship) =

History

Great Britain
- Name: Britannia
- Owner: Thomas Parr & Co.
- Builder: New Brunswick
- Launched: 1788
- Fate: Captured 1797

General characteristics
- Tons burthen: 201 (bm)
- Propulsion: Sails
- Sail plan: Brig
- Complement: 20
- Armament: 14 × 3,4,&9-pounder guns

Britannia, was a vessel launched in 1788 at New Brunswick. In 1795–1796, she made one complete voyage as a slave ship in the triangular trade, taking enslaved people from West Africa to Jamaica. A French privteer captured her in 1797 in a notable single ship action as Britannia was on the outward leg of her second voyage. Her captor took her to Nantes.

== Career ==
Britannia first appeared in Lloyd's Register (LR), in the volume for 1794.

Year	Master	Owner	Trade	Source
1794	P.Japee	Ellis & Co.	Alicante–Belfast; Cork–Jamaica	
1795	P.Jappee; J.Matthews	Ellis; Parr & Co.	Cork–Jamaica; Liverpool–Africa	LR

Joseph Matthews received a letter of marque for Britannia on 10 April 1795.

1st slave trading voyage (1795–1796): Captain Matthews sailed from Liverpool on 10 April 1795 and arrived in Africa on 27 July. Britannia acquired her slaves at Cape Coast Castle and then at Anomabu. She sailed from Africa on 19 December and arrived at Kingston on 15 February 1796. Reportedly she had embarked 292 slaves but arrived with 294. She sailed from Kingston on 6 June and arrived back at Liverpool on 27 August. She had left Liverpool with 26 crew members and she suffered four crew deaths on the voyage.

In 1797 Robert Pince replaced Matthews as master of Britannia.

2nd slave trading voyage (1797–loss): Pince sailed from Liverpool on 14 May 1797. As Pince was sailing from Liverpool to Africa, a French privateer captured him and took Britannia to Nantes.

On 1 June 1797 Britannia encountered the French privateer Oiseau, of Nantes. In the ensuing engagement Britannia had one man killed and several wounded, and suffered much damage before she struck after an hour's combat. When Britannia reached Nantes her cargo of trade goods sold for Livres 67,680. (Note: Oiseau had been armed with one 12-pounder gun and fifteen 6-pounder guns. She had a crew of 100 men under the command of Jacques Le Breton. Her owner was M.F. Cossin. HMS Penguin captured Oiseau on 21 August.)

In 1797, 40 British slave ships were lost whilst engaging in the slave trade. This was the second worst year for total losses in the period 1793–1807, after 1795 (50 losses). Eleven of the slave ships, including Britannia, were lost on their way to Africa to purchase slaves. War, not maritime hazards or slave resistance, was the greatest cause of vessel losses among British slave vessels between 1793 and 1807.
