= Dutch brig Komeet =

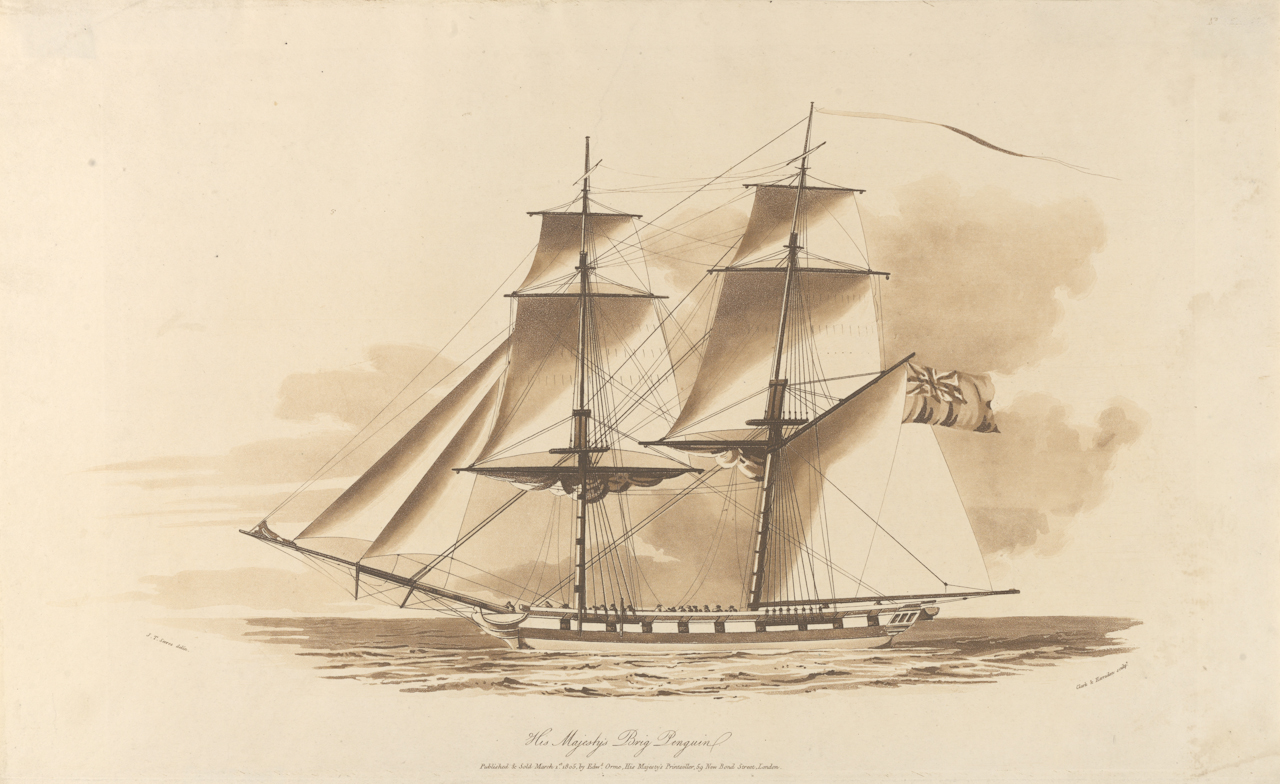
- His Majesty's Brig Penguin

History

Dutch Republic & Batavian Republic
- Name: Komeet
- Builder: Amsterdam
- Launched: 1789
- Captured: 1795

Great Britain
- Name: Comeet
- Acquired: 1795 by capture
- Commissioned: May 1796
- Out of service: Paid off to ordinary in 1806
- Renamed: HMS Penguin (1798)
- Fate: Sold 1808

General characteristics
- Type: Brig
- Tons burthen: 33626/94 (bm)
- Length: Overall; Dutch: 100' (Note: The measurement is in Amsterdam feet (voet) of 11 Amsterdam inches (duim) (see Dutch units of measurement). The Amsterdam foot is about 8% shorter than an English foot. The basis of measurement is also different.); British:92 ft 9 1/8 in (28.3 m); Keel:73 ft 3 7/8 in (22.3 m)
- Beam: Dutch:32'; British:29 ft 4 3/8 in (9.0 m)
- Depth of hold: Dutch:17'9/11; British:16 ft 4 1/2 in (5.0 m)
- Propulsion: Sails
- Complement: Dutch service:110; British service:125
- Armament: Dutch service: 18 × English 9-pounder guns; British service: 14 × 9-pounder guns + 2 × 18-pounder carronades

The Dutch brig Komeet was launched in 1789 at Amsterdam. HMS Unicorn captured her on the Irish station in 1795. The British Royal Navy took her into service as HMS Comeet; it renamed her HMS Penguin in 1798. It sold her in 1808.

== Dutch service ==
In 1791 Komeet sailed to Cape of Good Hope, in company with the Dutch naval corvette Scipio, leaving on 17 December 1791. Scipio arrived on 27 March 1792 and Komeet arrived on 4 April.

In May 1795, Komeet, under the command of Captain-Lieutenant Mynheer Claris, and Scipio, under the command of de Jong, set out with a convoy of nine East Indiamen for Europe. The problem was that France had occupied the Dutch Republic and its successor the Batavian Republic was now a French ally and thus an enemy of Great Britain. The Dutch captains decided to sail via the Shetland Islands to ports in then-neutral Norway.

On 28 August 1795, the convoy encountered Unicorn, in company with Diana and Seahorse. Unicorn captured the Dutch East Indiaman Cromhout or Crumhout. The Cromhout's capture resulted in at least £40,000 in prize money to be distributed among her captors. Then Unicorn parted company with the rest of the squadron and after a chase of 13 hours captured Komeet. Captain Thomas Williams of Unicorn described her as a remarkably fine vessel, only four years old, sails extremely well. She was armed with 18 English 9-pounder guns and was provisioned with water and food for 110 men for a nine-month cruise. The Royal Navy took her into service as Comeet. Scipio and the remaining seven Indiamen reached neutral Norway.

== British service ==
=== French Revolutionary Wars ===
The Royal Navy commissioned her in May 1796 under Commander John King Pulling. Although some records suggest that she was renamed to Penguin on 2 October 1798, she was already sailing under the name Penguin at the time that she captured her first prize in 1796.

On 10 April, Unicorn recaptured the brig Thames while in company with Penguin and the hired armed cutter Fox (the third). At some point between 28 March and 19 April, Penguin saved the crew of Prince of Wales, which had foundered on her way from Galway to Cork.

On 18 September Penguin captured the brig Mary, of Liverpool, after a chase of 10 hours. The French privateer lugger Taupe à L'Oeuil (or Tap à L'Oeil), of eight guns and 42 men, had captured her 5 days earlier. Discovering that Mary was faster than their own vessel, the privateers exchanged vessels, putting all their English prisoners in the lugger, after transferring their guns, small arms and ammunition to Mary, which they renamed Taupe à L'Oeuil. At the time that Penguin captured the French privateers, they had been out of Brest for 18 days and had taken four prizes, all of which Pulling was pleased to report Penguin had recaptured. The four were:

- Iris, Samuel Walters master, of and from Swansea, which had been sailing to Cork with a cargo of coal, taken on 10 September and retaken two days later;
- Betsey, William Biggs master, from Exeter, belonging to Teignmouth, sailing to Milford with a cargo of pottery, and ransomed. She had been taken on 12 September. When Penguin recaptured Mary, she also liberated the ransomer and the bond that had been paid.
- Mary, John Laughton master, from Leghorn, belonging to Liverpool, sailing to Bristol with a cargo of merchandise.
- Liverpool, Underwood master, from Lisbon, belonging to Liverpool, sailing to Bristol with a cargo of cotton. She had been taken and recaptured on 18 September. Penguin shared the prize money for Liverpool with Fox and Santa Margitta.

On 24 May 1797 Penguin was off The Lizard with a convoy sailing to Cork when she encountered the French lugger privateer Terrible. After a short chase Penguin was able to capture her quarry, which was armed with four guns and had a crew of 25 men. She was a week out of Morlaix but had not captured anything.

Penguin had one more notable action under Pulling's command. On 21 August she saw two vessels sailing towards her. They were flying the English flag, but then revealed themselves to be French. Within half-an-hour of an exchange of fire the rearmost struck. However, the seas were too rough for Pulling to take possession, and the other vessel was larger, so Pulling set off after her. A running fight lasting one hour and 40 minutes ensued before the second French vessel struck. She turned out to be the French privateer corvette Oiseau, pierced for 20 guns but carrying sixteen 9-pounder guns and two long French 12-pounder guns. She had a crew of 119 men, of whom one was killed and five wounded in the pursuit.

Pulling then went back to recapture the first vessel, which was trying to escape. She turned out to be Express, of Dartmouth, which Oiseau had captured. Express had been the French privateer Appocrate, of 12 guns, that had been captured a few months earlier.

Oiseau was quite new, having been launched in June and on her maiden cruise out of Nantes. She had been at sea for 34 days and had captured three prizes, including Express. (Note: This may not have been Oiseau's maiden cruise. In June she had captured Britannia and Cowley. On this cruise she had captured Cunningham, Joseph, and Columbia. In her two months of cruising, Oiseau's prizes had a cumulative value of Livres 1,018,150.)

Between September and December, Penguin briefly became Admiral R. Kingsmill's flagship. In January 1798 Commander Bendall Littlehales replaced Pulling. Littlehales continued on the Irish station until 15 May 1800 when he was promoted to post captain. His replacement on 22 July, was Commander Robert Mansel.

In February 1801 Mansel sailed Penguin for the Cape of Good Hope. On the way, on 18 February, Penguin engaged in an inconclusive engagement with three unidentified French ships near the Canary Islands. The three consisted of a corvette of 24 guns, and two privateers, each of 18 guns. Mansel sailed to meet the three and in the subsequent engagement managed to cause the corvette to strike her colours. However, he was unable to take possession as the other two French vessels continue firing. Eventually they succeeded in causing great damage to Penguin's rigging, essentially crippling her. By this time it was dark, and though Mansel and his crew stood ready to fight off boarders, the French took the opportunity to sail off. The crew worked to effect repairs and in the morning Penguin attempted to follow the French vessels, but was unable to prevent them reaching Teneriffe. In the engagement Penguin had several men wounded. The day after the engagement, Penguin detained a Swedish East Indiaman, which then carried his letter describing the action. A later account suggests one of the wounded men may have died subsequently.

Lieutenant the Honourable Duncombe Pleydell-Bouverie was promoted to Commander on 14 February 1801, but did not take command of Penguin until 28 August. At this time Penguin was on the Irish station again. Bouverie was promoted to post captain in Braave on 2 April 1802. His replacement, in June, was Lieutenant James M'Farland (or McFarlane). Between May and November 1803 Penguin was refitting at Portsmouth.

=== Napoleonic Wars ===
Commander George Morris recommissioned Penguin in October 1803 for the West Coast of Africa. Here, on 24 March, her boats destroyed a French privateer. Penguin had driven the privateer on the bar of the Senegal River on 17 March but could not get close enough to destroy her, while the surf did not do the job either. On 24 March two more French privateers showed up and attempted to rescue the stranded vessel. Rather than permit this, Morris sent in his boats, which were able to set her on fire. The British sustained no casualties in the affair.

The French privateer was the Renommee, under the command of Citizen Renaud. She was a large vessel, armed with twelve 6-pounder guns, two of which were still aboard her when the British destroyed her, and two 9-pounder guns. She had a crew of 89 men. She belonged to Senegal, but had come from Cayenne via Gorée. (Note: Head money was paid in September 1823. A first-class share was worth £134 0s 9 3/4d; a fifth-class share, that of a seaman, was worth £1 0s 9 1/4d.)

Morris sailed Penguin to the Jamaica station. There, on 22 February 1805, Penguin captured 797 bottles of quicksilver on the Spanish ship Emeralda. Then, sometime between 1 March and 1 June 1805, she captured the Spanish schooner Santa Severina, which was carrying pitch and tar.

Next, on 25 January 1806, Penguin was in company with Magicienne in the Mona Passage when Magicienne captured the Spanish packet ship Carmen, of two guns and 18 men. During 1806, Penguin also captured the Spanish privateer Marsellois, of three guns and 55 men.

After the Battle of San Domingo on 6 February, their captains drove the flagship, Impérial, and the Diomède, on shore between Nizao and Point Catalan, their hulls broadside to the beach and their bottoms stove in by the reefs that lay offshore, to prevent their capture.

On 8 February, Admiral Sir John Duckworth sent boats from Acasta and Magicienne to the wrecks. Boarding unopposed, the boat parties removed the remaining French crewmen as prisoners and set both ships on fire. Penguin shared by agreement in Magicienne's prize money from the action. (Note: At the second and final distribution of prize money for the battle, a seaman on Magicienne or Penguin received £1 19s 7d. Because of the sharing arrangement, this was 14s 7d less than what seamen on the other British vessels received. Magicienne and Penguin also shared in the proceeds of sundry parts and stores salvaged from the wrecked French vessels.)

In June, Penguin was under the command of Commander John Langdale Smith. On 16 June she captured the sloop Two Sisters, while still on the Jamaica station. In August Morris took command of Elk, on the Jamaica station, replacing Smith.

On 18 August Penguin was in company with Franchise, Magicienne, and Veteran as they escorted a fleet of 109 merchantmen from Jamaica to Britain. The convoy cleared the Gulf of Florida but between 19 and 23 August they ran into a gale that did not fully abate until 25 August. Initial reports had nine vessels foundering, with the crew of some being saved; later reports put the loss at 13 merchant vessels foundered and two abandoned but later salvaged. Franchise lost her fore-mast and main-top-mast but together with Penguin managed to bring 71 merchant vessels back to England. (Others arrived earlier or later, and some went to America.) Magicienne, however, was so badly damaged that she had to put in at Bermuda for repairs.

== Fate ==
Penguin was paid off to ordinary in second-half 1806. She was offered for sale on 27 July 1808 at Chatham, and sold that same day.
