= Mary Wilde, Baroness Penzance =

English gardener

- Born: 22 December 1825
- Died: 24 October 1900 (aged 74)
- Spouse: James Wilde (m. 1860)
- Father: William Pleydell-Bouverie
- Relatives: Jacob Pleydell-Bouverie (brother); Edward Pleydell-Bouverie (brother); Jacob Pleydell-Bouverie (grandfather); Henry St John-Mildmay (grandfather)

Mary Wilde, Baroness Penzance (22 December 1825 – 24 October 1900), born Lady Mary Pleydell-Bouverie, was an English gardener. She was the daughter of William Pleydell-Bouverie, 3rd Earl of Radnor and Judith Anne St. John-Mildmay. She married Sir James Wilde in 1860, becoming Baroness Penzance on her husband's elevation to the peerage in 1869. The couple resided at Eashing Park, Godalming. She shared her husband's passion for roses and helped him in his rose breeding. One of his rose cultivars is named "Lady Penzance" in her honour. Lady Penzance died on 24 October 1900.
