= John Campbell-Wyndham =

British politician (1798–1868)

Member of Parliament for Salisbury
- In office 24 November 1843 – 30 July 1847 Serving with William Chaplin (Jan. 1847–Jul. 1847); Ambrose Hussey (1843–Jan. 1847)
- Preceded by: Ambrose Hussey; Wadham Wyndham
- Succeeded by: William Chaplin; Charles Baring Wall

Personal details
- Born: John Henry Campbell; 26 July 1798 Croydon, Surrey, England
- Died: 1868 (aged 69–70)
- Party: Conservative

John Henry Campbell-Wyndham (26 July 1798 – 16 November 1868), known as John Henry Campbell until between 1843 and 1847, was a British Conservative politician.

Born in Croydon, Surrey, Campbell-Wyndham was the son of John Campbell and Caroline Frances née Wyndham. In 1839, he married Urania Mary Ann Kington, daughter of Peter Kington and Lady Urania Anne née Paulet, but the couple had no children.

Campbell-Wyndham, then known as Campbell, was elected Conservative Member of Parliament for Salisbury at a by-election in 1843—caused by the death of his uncle Wadham Wyndham—and held the seat until 1847, when he did not seek re-election.

He died on 16 November 1868, a few days after being thrown from a horse.

Parliament of the United Kingdom
| Preceded by Ambrose Hussey; Wadham Wyndham | Member of Parliament for Salisbury; 1843–1847; With: William Chaplin (Jan. 1847–Jul. 1847); Ambrose Hussey (1843–Jan. 1847) | Succeeded by William Chaplin; Charles Baring Wall |
