= William Bird Brodie =

Politician, died 1863

Member of Parliament for Salisbury
- In office 14 December 1832 – 4 May 1843 Serving with Wadham Wyndham (1835–1843); Duncombe Pleydell-Bouverie (1833–1835); Wadham Wyndham (1832–1833)
- Preceded by: Duncombe Pleydell-Bouverie; Wadham Wyndham
- Succeeded by: Ambrose Hussey; Wadham Wyndham

Personal details
- Born: 26 September 1780
- Died: 24 October 1863 (aged 83)
- Party: Whig
- Spouse(s): Frances Huntley (m. 1826) Louisa Hussey (m. 1810; died 1816)

William Bird Brodie (26 September 1780 – 24 October 1863) was a British Whig politician.

Brodie was the son of Reverend Peter Bellinger Brodie and Sarah née Collins. In 1810, he married Louisa Hussey, daughter of Thomas Hussey. After her death in 1816, he married Frances Huntley, daughter of Reverend Richard Huntley, in 1826.

Brodie was elected Whig Member of Parliament for Salisbury at the 1832 general election and held the seat until 1843 when he resigned the seat by accepting the office of Steward of the Chiltern Hundreds.

Parliament of the United Kingdom
| Preceded by Duncombe Pleydell-Bouverie; Wadham Wyndham | Member of Parliament for Salisbury; 1832–1843; With: Wadham Wyndham (1835–1843); Duncombe Pleydell-Bouverie (1833–1835); Wadham Wyndham (1832–1833) | Succeeded by Ambrose Hussey; Wadham Wyndham |
