= Oiseau (1797 privateer) =

History

France
- Name: Oiseau
- Namesake: French for bird
- Commissioned: May 1797
- Captured: 21 August 1797

General characteristics
- Tons burthen: (bm)
- Complement: 1st cruise: 100; 2nd cruise: 119
- Armament: 1st cruise: 1 × 12-pounder + 15 × 6-pounder guns; 2nd cruise: 2 × 12-pounder + 16 × 9-pounder guns

Oiseau was a privateer brig from Nantes, commissioned in May 1797. She had a short, but highly successful career. In her three to four months of cruising, before the Royal Navy captured her, Oiseau's captured eight prizes, seven of which were not recaptured. Her first prize required a single ship action. Her prizes had a cumulative value of Livres 1,168,150.

== 1st cruise (May–June) ==
Oiseau was under the command of Jacques Breton (or Le Breton), and had a complement of 100 men.

The slave ship Britannia, Robert Pince, master, sailed from Liverpool on 14 May 1797, bound for Africa. In late May she encountered a British warship that warned Pince that a French privateer brig was in the vicinity. He decided to look for the privateer. On 1 June, Britannia encountered Oiseau. In the ensuing engagement Britannia had one man killed and several wounded, and suffered much damage before she struck after an hour's combat. Lloyd's List reported that a French privateer had captured Britannia, and Elizabeth, Crellin, master, from Liverpool to Martinique, and had taken them into Nantes. (Note: Elizabeth, of 166 tons (bm), R.Crillon, master, had been launched in Wales in 1784.) When Britannia reached Nantes her cargo of trade goods sold for Livres 67,680.

On 15 June Oiseaux returned to Nantes with Cowley, a three-masted vessel of 400 tons. There, the 360 barrels of sugar, casks of coffee, staves, and cacao stowed in her hold were valued at Livres 465,009. Lloyd's List reported that Oiseau had captured Cowley, George, master, as Cowley was sailing from San Domingo to London. Oiseau prevailed after a two-hour fight and sent Cowley into Minden. (Note: Cowley, of 248 tons, was built at New Brunswick in 1790. In 1797, her master was R. George, her owner Cumming, and her voyage was London–West Indies. When Cowley was sold her new owners retained her name. HMS Uranie recaptured Le Cowley on 6 January 1800. Cowley was on her way from Lorient to Brest; Uranie took her into Plymouth.)

== 2nd cruise (July–August) ==
Oiseau was again under the command Le Breton.

On 4 August, Cunningham, of four guns, arrived in the Loire. Her cargo of charcoal was sold for Lives 9,940. Lloyd's List reported that a French privateer had captured Cunningham, from Greenock, off Cape Clear. (Note: Cunningham, of 104 tons, was built at Saltcoats in 1780. In 1797, her master changed from W.McGill to J.Drummond, and her owner from Robinson to R.Wilson. Her voyage changed from Greenock–Martinique to Greenock–Oporto.)

On 9 August, two more prizes to Oiseau entered the Loire.

Joseph, a brig of 125 tons, was carrying some barrels of oil and seal skins. Her cargo was valued at Livres 7,120. Lloyd's List reported that a French privateer had captured Joseph, Tullock, master, near Cape Clear, as she was sailing from Newfoundland to Poole. (Note: One source refers to Joseph as St Joseph, and describes her cargo as consisting of skins.) (Note: Joseph, of 86 tons, was built at Poole in 1770. In 1797 her master was J. Tullock, her owner was Harrison, and her voyage was Poole–Newfoundland.)

Columbia, was an American vessel carrying a cargo of sugar, coffee, tobacco, and hides. Oiseau captured Columbia on 2 August. Although the United States was neutral, Columbia was condemned for defective papers, in particular, for not having a crew list. Her cargo was valued at Livres 468,601. Lloyd's List reported that a French privateer had captured Columbia, Lathrop, master, and taken her into Nantes. Columbia had been sailing from New York to Hamburg. (Note: Another source does not name Columbia, but simply describes her as being of 300 tons (bm), with a cargo of sugar.)

On 5 September Daphne came into the Loire. She brought the news that Oiseau had been captured. Her cargo of salted goods was valued at Livres 150,000. Lloyd's List reported that the French privateer Oiseau had captured Daphne, Keatley, master, as Daphne was sailing from Limerick to London. (Note: Daphne, of 91 tons, was a French prize.)

== Capture ==
On 21 August 1797, HMS Penguin, Commander John King Pulling, saw two vessels sailing towards her. They were flying the British flag, but then revealed themselves to be French. Within half-an-hour of an exchange of fire the rearmost struck. However, the seas were too rough for Pulling to take possession, and the other vessel was larger, so Pulling set off after her. A running fight lasting one hour and 40 minutes ensued before the second French vessel struck. She turned out to be the French privateer corvette Oiseau, pierced for 20 guns but carrying sixteen 9-pounder guns and two long French 12-pounder guns. She had a crew of 119 men, of whom one was killed and five wounded in the pursuit.

Pulling then went back to recapture the first vessel, which was trying to escape. She turned out to be Express, of Dartmouth, which Oiseau had captured. Express had been the French privateer Appocrate, of 12 guns, that had been captured a few months earlier.

Pulling reported that Oiseau had been at sea for 34 days and had captured three prizes, including Express. Lloyd's List reported that Express, Pearson, master, had been taken and retaken on her way from London to Newfoundland, and had arrived at Cork. (Note: Express, of 113 tons (bm), was a French prize, launched in 1795. Her master was W.Pearson, her owner was Codner, and her voyage was London–Newfoundland.)

Oiseau's prizes had a cumulative value of Livres 1,168,150. (Note: At an exchange rate of 24.75 Livres per pound sterling, the sterling value of the prizes was approximately £47,000.)
