= James Wilde, 1st Baron Penzance =

British judge and rose breeder (1816–1899)

The Right Honourable The Lord Penzance PC
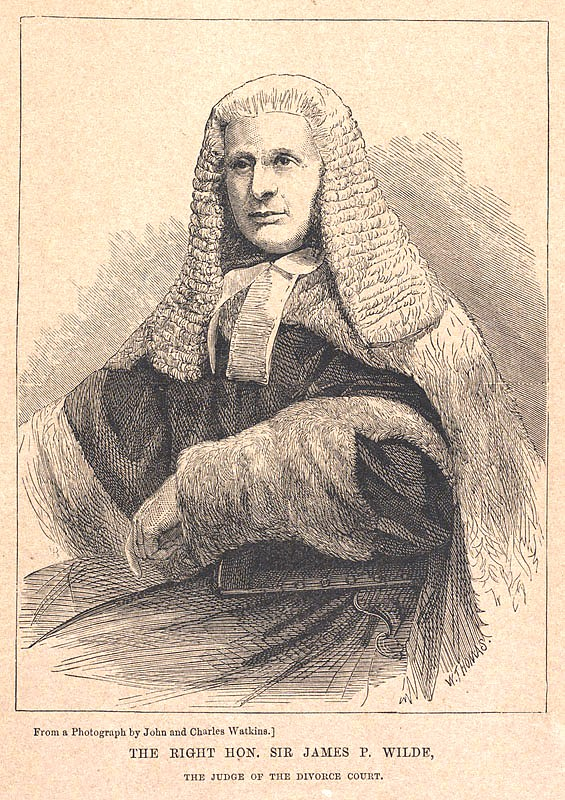
- Born: 12 July 1816; London, England
- Died: 9 December 1899 (aged 83)
- Education: Trinity College, Cambridge
- Spouse: Lady Mary Pleydell-Bouverie (m. 1860)

James Plaisted Wilde, 1st Baron Penzance, PC (12 July 1816 – 9 December 1899) was a noted British judge and rose breeder who was also a proponent of the Baconian theory that the works usually attributed to William Shakespeare were in fact written by Francis Bacon.

== Background and education ==
Born in London, he was the son of Edward Archer Wilde, a solicitor, and Marianne (née Norris). His younger brother Sir Alfred Thomas Wilde was a Lieutenant-General in the Madras Army, while Sir John Wylde (Chief Justice of the Cape Colony) and Thomas Wilde, 1st Baron Truro (Lord Chancellor) were his uncles.

He was educated at Winchester College and Trinity College, Cambridge (matriculated 1834, graduated B.A. 1838, M.A. 1842). He was admitted to the Inner Temple in 1836, and called to the Bar in 1839.

== Legal career ==
He became a successful lawyer himself and was appointed a Queen's Counsel in 1855. He was knighted in 1860, shortly after his appointment as a Baron of the Exchequer. He presided over the Court of Probate and Divorce from 1863 until his retirement in 1872, being raised to the peerage as Baron Penzance, of Penzance in the County of Cornwall, in 1869. He was the judge in the sensational Mordaunt divorce case.

In 1875, he accepted the post as Dean of Arches and presided over a number of notorious trials; Bell Cox, Dale, Enraght, Green and Tooth, under the Public Worship Regulation Act 1874 arising out of the Ritualist controversy in the Church of England.

In 1866, he presided over Hyde v. Hyde, a polygamy case. In his ruling, Lord Penzance stated:

What, then, is the nature of this institution as understood in Christendom?...If it be of common acceptance and existence, it must have some pervading identity and universal basis. I conceive that marriage, as understood in Christendom, may for this purpose be defined as the voluntary union for life of one man and one woman, to the exclusion of all others.

This remained the common-law definition of marriage throughout the British Empire and successor states. In Canada, it was overruled by an explicit statutory definition in the Civil Marriage Act 2005, which allowed for same-sex marriage.

== Shakespeare ==
Wilde argued, following Lord Campbell and others, that the works of Shakespeare are extremely accurate in matters of law. In The Bacon-Shakespeare Controversy (1890) he wrote of "Shakespeare's perfect familiarity with... English law... so perfect and intimate that he was never incorrect and never at fault", arguing that this was evidence that the plays were the work of a legal expert such as Bacon. Several other authors followed Wilde's arguments about the legal expertise used in Shakespeare, including Sir George Greenwood. Opponents of Wilde's view argued that Shakespeare's knowledge of the law was not exceptional.

== Family and gardening ==
He married Lady Mary, daughter of William Pleydell-Bouverie, 3rd Earl of Radnor, in 1860. There were no children from the marriage. The couple resided at Eashing Park, Godalming.

At his garden in Godalming, from Rosa eglanteria and Rosa foetida he produced two new roses named Lady and Lord Penzance. He went on to produce a further 14 roses named after characters in the novels of Sir Walter Scott, including the Jeanie Deans Hybrid Rose.

== Bibliography ==
- Dewar, Mary. (1964). Sir Thomas Smith: A Tudor Intellectual in Office. London: Athlone.
- Strype, John. (1698). The Life of the Learned Sir Thomas Smith, T. D.C.L. New York: Burt Franklin, 1974. ISBN 0-8337-3447-4.
- Wilde, J.P. (1902) Lord Penzance on the Bacon-Shakespeare Controversy - A Judicial Summing-Up
- Wilde, J.P. (ed.) M.H. Kinnear (1992) Lord Penzance's Trial of Shakespeare: Verdict for Bacon ISBN 1-85571-308-X

== Arms ==
Coat of arms of James Wilde, 1st Baron Penzance

Crest
A hart lodged holding in its mouth a rose Proper.
Escutcheon
Ermine on a cross Sable a plate a chief of the second charged with three martlets Argent.
Supporters
On either side a bull regardant Argent gorged with a collar Vair and chain reflexed over the back.
Motto
Veritas Victrix

Peerage of the United Kingdom
New creation	Baron Penzance; 1869–1899	Extinct
