= John Blackburne (Huddersfield MP) =

British barrister and politician

John Blackburne (1787 – 21 April 1837) was a British barrister and politician.

Born in Huddersfield, the son of Joseph Blackburne, he matriculated at Brasenose College, Oxford in 1805. He became a bencher of the Middle Temple, and a King's Counsel. He was appointed as Chief Commissioner of the Corporation Inquiry. He stood in the 1834 Huddersfield by-election as a Whig, winning the seat. In Parliament, he supported a three-year maximum period between general elections, and opposed the Corn Laws. He held his seat until his death, in 1837.

Parliament of the United Kingdom
Preceded by Lewis Fenton	Member of Parliament for Huddersfield; 1834–1837	Succeeded by Edward Ellice
