= John Entwistle (politician) =

British politician

John Entwistle (or Entwisle, 16 August 1784 – 5 April 1837) was a British politician.

Entwistle lived at Foxholes, in Lancashire. He was the first president of the South Lancashire Conservative Association. He served as High Sheriff of Lancashire in 1824.

Entwistle stood unsuccessfully for the Tories in Knaresborough at the 1830 UK general election, and then Rochdale at the 1832 UK general election. He won Rochdale for the new Conservative Party at the 1835 UK general election, serving until his death, in 1837.

Parliament of the United Kingdom
Preceded by John Fenton	Member of Parliament for Rochdale; 1835 – 1837	Succeeded by John Fenton
