= Lewis Fenton =

British politician (1780–1833)

Lewis Fenton (1780 – 27 November 1833) was a British politician.

Fenton lived in Huddersfield and served as a captain in the 55th Regiment of Foot. At the 1832 UK general election, he stood in Huddersfield as a Whig, and won election. In Parliament, he supported the Factory Act 1833. He died in November 1833, still in office. According to the Sunday Times, he died by falling from a window after standing on a chair to get a better view of his turnip patch.

Parliament of the United Kingdom
New constituency	Member of Parliament for Huddersfield; 1832–1833	Succeeded by John Blackburne
