= John Fenton (MP for Rochdale) =

John Fenton (3 July 1791 – 25 July 1863) was a British politician.

Born at Lower Crimble Farm, Fenton lived in Rochdale, where he worked as a banker. At the 1832 UK general election, he stood for the Whigs in Rochdale. He won the seat but was defeated at the 1835 UK general election. In 1837, a by-election arose in the town, which he won with a majority of 25. He held the seat in the 1837 UK general election but chose not to contest it in 1841.

Fenton married, firstly, Elizabeth Aipdaile, daughter of William Apedaile of Gateshead. Their son Roger Fenton became a noted photographer. Another son, Arthur, married the novelist Gertrude Fenton.

Parliament of the United Kingdom
Preceded by New seat	Member of Parliament for Rochdale; 1832 – 1835	Succeeded by John Entwistle
Preceded by John Entwistle	Member of Parliament for Rochdale; 1837 – 1841	Succeeded by William Sharman Crawford
