= November 1843 Salisbury by-election =

UK parliamentary by-election

The November 1843 Salisbury by-election was an election held on 24 November 1843. The by-election was brought about due to the death of the incumbent Conservative MP, Wadham Wyndham. It was won by the Conservative candidate John Campbell.

By-election, 24 November 1843: Salisbury
Party	Candidate	Votes	%	±%
Conservative	John Campbell	317	54.0	−13.2
Whig	Edward Pleydell-Bouverie	270	46.0	+13.2
Majority		47	8.0	−0.2
Turnout		587	81.1	−7.6
Registered electors		724		
Conservative hold		Swing	−13.2	
