= May 1843 Salisbury by-election =

UK parliamentary by-election

The May 1843 Salisbury by-election was an election held on 4 May 1843. The by-election was brought about due to the resignation of the incumbent Liberal MP, W. B. Brodie. It was won by the Conservative candidate Ambrose Hussey.

By-election, 4 May 1843: Salisbury
Party	Candidate	Votes	%	±%
Conservative	Ambrose Hussey	252	57.3	−9.9
Whig	Edward Pleydell-Bouverie	188	42.7	+9.9
Majority		64	14.6	N/A
Turnout		440	60.8	−27.9
Registered electors		724		
Conservative gain from Whig		Swing	−9.9	
