= William Chaplin (coach proprietor) =

British businessman (1787–1859)

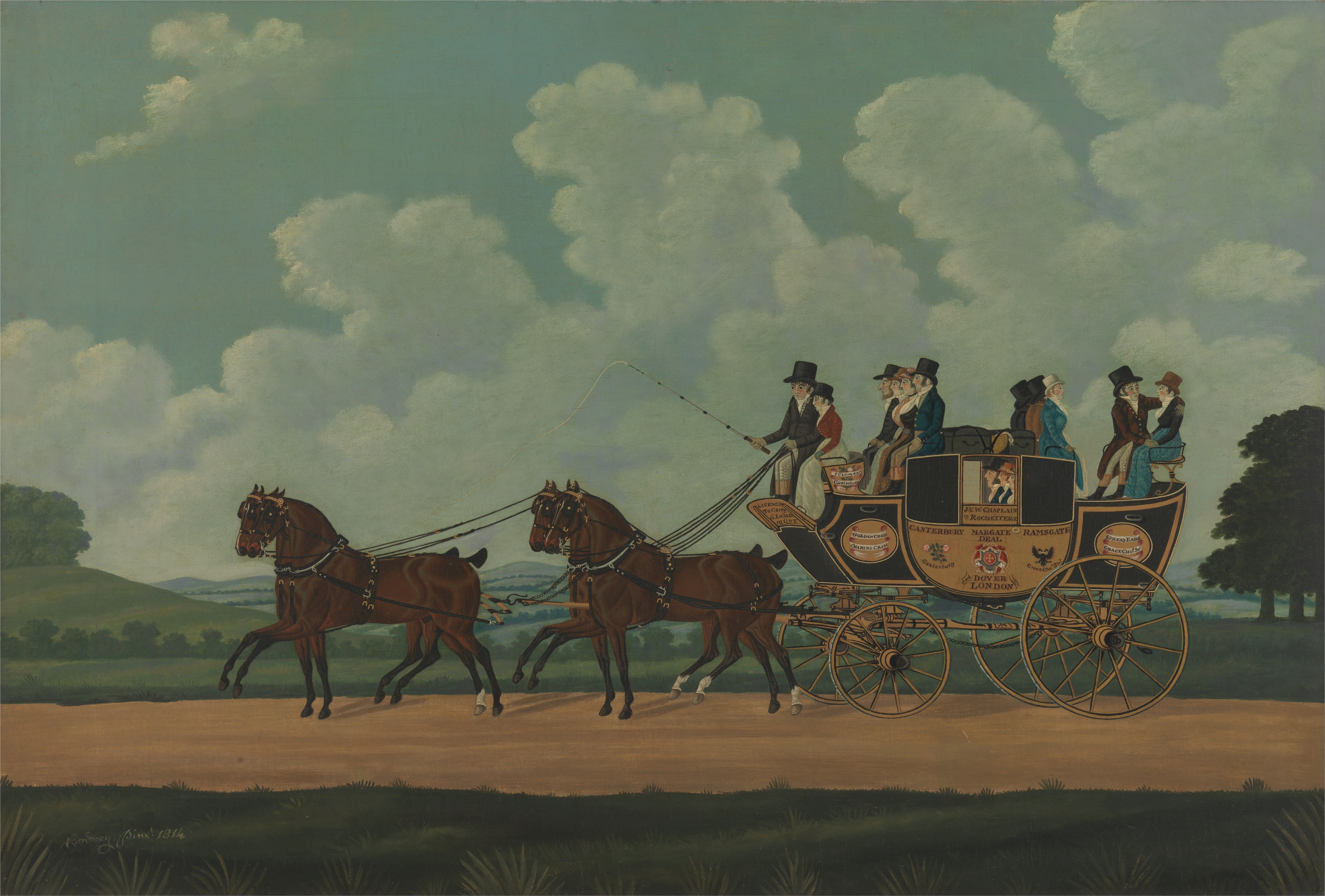
J. & W. Chaplin's Dover-London Stage on the Road in a painting by John Cordrey

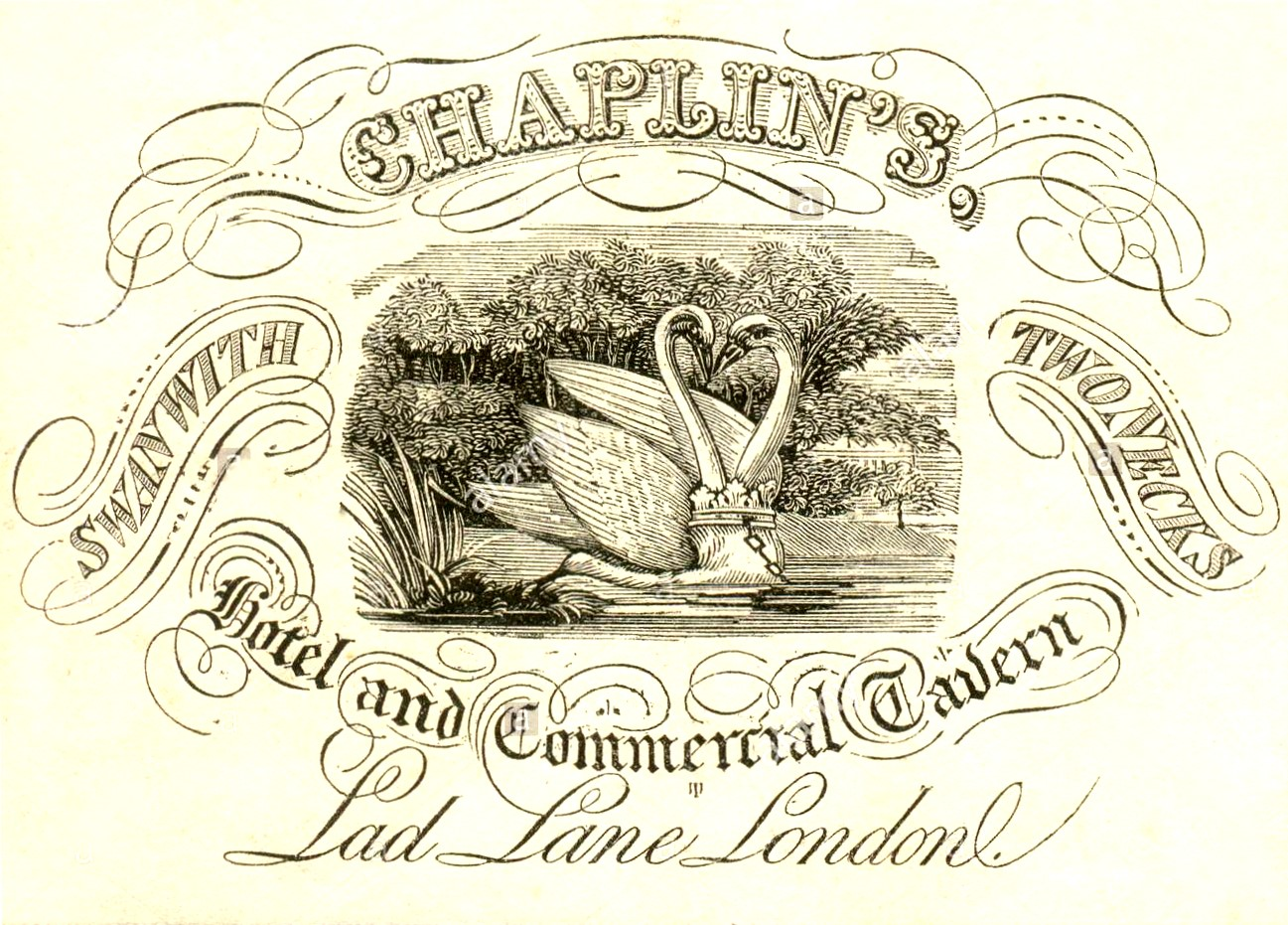
Chaplin's Swan with Two Necks Hotel and Commercial Tavern Lad Lane London

William James Chaplin (1787–1859) was a stage coach proprietor who developed a large coaching business before the arrival of the railways. He has been called "perhaps the greatest coach proprietor that ever lived". His great rival was Edward Sherman.

Chaplin could see that the railways would destroy the coaching trade; he therefore shifted his investments into the London and Southampton Railway (which later changed its name to London and South Western Railway) and became the Deputy Chairman by 1840. He became the Chairman in 1843, a post he retained until 1858 (apart from a period between 1853 and 1854).

He was elected as Member of Parliament for Salisbury at the January 1847 by-election. He retained the seat at the general election in June of that year, but left the house at the next general election in 1857.
