= Wadham Penruddock Wyndham =

British Member of Parliament

Wadham Penruddock Wyndham (16 October 1773 – 23 October 1843) was a British Member of Parliament.

The eldest surviving son of Henry Penruddocke Wyndham of St Edmund's College, Salisbury, he was educated at Lord Weymouth's Grammar School, Warminster, from 1787 to 1789 and at Eton College in 1793. He was a cornet in the Wiltshire Yeomanry in 1794, a captain in the Wiltshire Militia in 1796, and major in 1805.

Wyndham represented Salisbury in Parliament from 1818 until unseated on 6 May 1833, then again from 1835 until his death in 1843 aged 70. He was Mayor of Wilton from 1825 to 1826.

Wadham Wyndham succeeded his father in 1819. On 1 March 1821 he was married to Anne Eliza, daughter of Sir John Slade, 1st Baronet, but they had no children. He was succeeded by his sister Caroline Frances, wife of John Campbell of Dunoon; their son John Henry Wyndham-Campbell was also an MP for Salisbury.
