= Richard Bartholomew (MP) =

English politician

Richard Bartholomew, Bartilmewe or Bartilmoes (by 1455 – c. 1525 or later), of Salisbury, Wiltshire, was an English politician.

== Career ==
Bartholomew was a wealthy merchant and Mayor of Salisbury in 1487 and 1507.

He was elected a Member (MP) of the Parliament of England for Salisbury in 1497, 1512 and 1515.

== Family ==
By 1481, he was married to a woman named Margery. They had five sons, including John and Richard, both merchants who predeceased their father.

Parliament of England
| Preceded by Thomas Coke with William Webbe alias Kellowe | Member of Parliament for Salisbury; 1497, 1512 and 1515; With: Thomas Coke | Succeeded by John Abarough with Thomas Brodegate |
