= Webbe =

Webbe is a surname, and may refer to:

== In arts and entertainment ==
- Benji Webbe (born 1967), Welsh singer
- Samuel Webbe (1740–1816), English composer
- Simon Webbe (born 1978), British musician
- William James Webbe (1830–1904), English painter

== In government and politics ==
- Anthony Webbe (English politician) (died 1578?), English politician
- Claudia Webbe (born 1965), English politician
- George Webbe (MP) (by 1509–1556), English politician
- Sir Harold Webbe (1885–1965), English politician
- Henry Webbe, 14th-century English politician
- James Webbe (by 1528–1557), English politician
- John Webbe (died 1557), English politician, MP for Dover
- John Webbe (died 1571), English politician, MP for Salisbury
- Josiah Webbe (1768–1804), East India Company official
- William Webbe alias Kellowe (by 1466–1523), MP for Salisbury
- William Webbe (by 1499–1554), MP for Salisbury
- William Webbe (by 1508–c. 1547), MP for Huntingdon
- William Webbe (fl.1542), MP for Warwick
- William Webbe (died 1585), MP for Salisbury
- William Webbe (mayor) (died 1599), Lord Mayor of London
- William Harold Webbe (1885–1965), British politician

== In sport ==
- A. J. Webbe (1855–1941), English cricketer
- George Webbe (cricketer, born 1856) (1856–1934), New Zealand cricketer
- Glen Webbe (born 1962), Welsh rugby union player
- Terrance Webbe (born 1969), West Indian cricketer

== In other fields ==
- Joseph Webbe (fl.1610–1630), English grammarian, physician and astrologer

== See also ==
- Webb (disambiguation)
