= Henry Sherfield =

English lawyer and politician

Henry Sherfield (1572 (baptised) – January 1634) was an English lawyer and politician who sat in the House of Commons from 1621 to 1629. He held strong Puritan views, and was taken through a celebrated court case as a result of his iconoclastic action.

== Life ==
Sherfield probably lived in early life at Walhampton in Hampshire. He chose the law as his profession, and entered at Lincoln's Inn. Shortly before 1614 he received an appointment as Recorder of Southampton. He was elected as Member of Parliament for Southampton in 1621. From 1622 to his death he served as one of the governors of Lincoln's Inn and was reader in 1623. In January 1624 he was chosen as MP for both Southampton and Salisbury. In March of the same year he became recorder of Salisbury and chose to sit for Salisbury. He retained his seat until the dissolution of 1629.

Sherfield brought attention to himself by attacking George Villiers, 1st Duke of Buckingham. In 1629 he inflamed the situation by pointing out, on 7 February, that Richard Neile, bishop of Winchester, had inserted words into the pardons of Richard Montagu and others which freed them from the penalties of erroneous and unorthodox opinions. Parliament was dissolved on 2 March 1629 and this prevented proceedings being taken against Neile. Sherfield's stepson, Walter Long, was one of the seven members arrested after the dissolution, and Sherfield was one of the counsel employed in his defence.

Sherfield returned to his home at Winterbourne Earls in Wiltshire, and resumed his office of recorder. He was disturbed by the revival of ritualism under William Laud. He was a member of the vestry of the parish church of St Edmund's, where there was a painted window in which God the Father was portrayed as a little old man in a red and blue cloak, measuring the sun and moon with a pair of compasses. Some of the people were accustomed to bow to this window. In February 1630 Sherfield obtained leave of the vestry to remove the painting and replace it with plain glass. John Davenant, bishop of Salisbury, forbade the churchwardens to carry out the order. After some delay Sherfield, in defiance of this decree, went into the church by himself, and dashed his stick through the window. In February 1633 Sherfield was summoned to answer for his conduct before the Star chamber. He was unanimously adjudged in fault, but there was considerable difference as to a fitting penalty. Laud was on the side of severity, and so was Neile. The sentence finally fixed was a fine of £500 and a public acknowledgment of his fault to Davenant. Sherfield made the acknowledgment on 8 April 1633, but he died in January 1634, before paying his fine. His house at Winterbourne Earls had been burned in March 1633, and his loss was estimated at £2,000.

Sherfield married in about 1616 Rebecca Long, widow of Walter Long of Whaddon, Wiltshire, and daughter of Christopher Bailey of Southwick, Wiltshire. He left one daughter.

Parliament of England
Preceded by Sir Thomas Fleming; Thomas Cheeke	Member of Parliament for Southampton; 1621–1624; With: Sir Thomas Fleming 1621–1622; Sir John Mill, 1st Baronet 1624	Succeeded by Sir John Mill, 1st Baronet; John Bonde
Preceded by Roger Gauntlett; Thomas Hussey	Member of Parliament for Salisbury; 1624–1629; With: Roger Gauntlett 1624; Walter Long 1625; John Puxton 1626; Bartholemew Tookey 1628–1629	Parliament suspended until 1640
