= List of mayors of Salisbury =

The following were mayors of Salisbury, Wiltshire, England:

== 14th–16th centuries ==
- 1387: John Hethe, MP for Salisbury, 1388
- 1388, 1391: John Moner, MP for Salisbury, 1397
- 1395–1397: Richard Spencer, four times MP for Salisbury, 1395–1411
- 1397: John Moner
- 1402: Henry Man, six times MP for Salisbury, 1415–1429
- 1408-9: Walter Shirley
- 1416–17: Walter Shirley
- 1418: Robert Poynaunt, MP for Salisbury, 1420
- 1426-7: John Noble
- 1431, 1438: Henry Man
- 1487: Richard Bartholomew, MP for Salisbury, 1497, 1512 and 1515
- 1491–92: Thomas Coke, six times MP for Salisbury between 1489 and 1515
- 1507: Richard Bartholomew
- 1510–11: Thomas Coke
- 1517: John Abarough, MP for Salisbury, 1515 and 1523
- 1520–21: Thomas Brodegate, MP for Salisbury, 1515
- 1528: Robert South, MP for Salisbury, 1536 and 1539
- 1537–38: Henry Coldston, MP for Salisbury, 1539
- 1545: Robert Griffith, MP for Salisbury, 1554
- 1547: Thomas Chaffyn, MP for Salisbury, 1555
- 1558–59: Robert Eyre, MP for Salisbury, 1558 and 1563
- 1560–61: John Webbe, MP for Salisbury, 1558
- 1561–62: William Webbe, MP for Salisbury, 1559
- 1565: Anthony Weekes, MP for Salisbury, 1563
- 1577: John Bayley, MP for Salisbury, 1589
- 1584: Robert Bower, MP for Salisbury, 1593
- 1592–93: Giles Hutchens, MP for Salisbury, 1593 and 1597

== 17th century ==
- 1600 Mathew Bee
- 1601 Henry Byle
- 1602 Jacob Harvylande
- 1603 William Eaton
- 1604 Roger Barnes
- 1605 Thomas Hancocke
- 1606 Roger Gauntlett, MP for Salisbury
- 1607 Bartholomew Tookie
- 1608 Edward Roades
- 1609 Richard Gauntlett
- 1610 Bartholomew Tookie, MP for Salisbury
- 1611 Thomas Raye
- 1612 Laurence Horne
- 1613 Alexander Alford
- 1614 Henry Pearson
- 1615 Richard Godfrey
- 1616 Robert Maswell
- 1617 George Churchhouse
- 1618 John Wendover
- 1619 William Goodridge
- 1620 William Ray
- 1621 Maurice Green
- 1622 Thomas Sqibb
- 1623 Robert Jole
- 1624 Robert Checkford
- 1625 Wolstan Coward
- 1626 John Ivie
- 1627 James Abbot
- 1628 John Batt
- 1629 Thomas Hill
- 1630 Richard Carter
- 1631 Henry Byley
- 1632 Mathew Bee
- 1633 Nicholas Elliot
- 1634 John Dove, MP for Salisbury
- 1635 Maurice Bylerigg
- 1636 Richard Carter
- 1637 John Ranger or Banger
- 1638 Thomas Hancock
- 1639 William Joyce
- 1640 Richard Gauntlett
- 1641 Thomas Lawes
- 1642 Humphry Ditton
- 1643 Thomas Hancock
- 1644 Francis Dove
- 1645 Humphry Ditton
- 1646 Edward Edmunds
- 1647 John Ivie
- 1648 Richard Banks
- 1649 Francis Dove
- 1650 Thomas Keynon
- 1651 Thomas Ovyatt
- 1652 Thomas Ray jnr
- 1653 William Wilson
- 1654 Wichard Phelps
- 1655 William Stone
- 1656 Robert Good
- 1657 Thomas Cutler
- 1658 Christopher Batt
- 1659 Thomas Abbot
- 1660 Maurice Green
- 1661 Thomas Gardiner
- 1662 Thomas Batter
- 1663 William Wilson
- 1664 John Joyce
- 1665 Thomas Williams
- 1666 Isaac A’Court
- 1667 William Slanne
- 1668 William Vyner
- 1669 Edmund Marke
- 1670 Ambrose West
- 1671 Christopher Gardiner
- 1672 Robert Jones
- 1673 James Bennett
- 1674 William Smith
- 1675 Thomas Keynton
- 1676 Giles Naish
- 1677 Oliver Shergold
- 1678 James Harris
- 1679 Roger Baskett
- 1680 John Priaulx
- 1681 Richard Minefye
- 1682 Andrew Bauden
- 1683 William Clements
- 1684 Thomas Wansborough
- 1685 Richard Eyre
- 1685 Christopher Gardiner
- 1686 Edward Faulkner
- 1687 George Clement
- 1688 John Hill
- 1689 Peter Phelps
- 1690 Thomas Haskett
- 1691 John Coleman
- 1692 Thomas Taylor
- 1693 John Parsons
- 1694 John Pain
- 1695 James Wyatt
- 1696 Francis Keynton
- 1697 Richard Long
- 1698 William Barnes
- 1699 Richard Hill

== 18th century ==
- 1700 George Flower
- 1700 William Waterman
- 1701 Thomas Abbot
- 1702 Johnathon Newman
- 1703 James Hayter
- 1704 Walter Ireland
- 1705 Henry Long
- 1706 William Green
- 1707 Joseph Gifford
- 1708 William Hillman
- 1709 John Prater
- 1710 Thomas Clifton
- 1711 John King
- 1712 Richard Marsh
- 1713 Walter Barry
- 1714 William Naish
- 1715 Edward Cornelius
- 1716 James Blake
- 1717 Edward Cornelius
- 1718 James Blake
- 1719 William Strugnell
- 1720 Silvester Pope
- 1721 Richard Spinney
- 1722 William Batt
- 1723 James Stone
- 1724 Johnathon Newman
- 1725 Henry Bennet
- 1726 Samuel Case
- 1727 Thomas Light
- 1728 Henry Case
- 1729 John Robbins
- 1730 George Flower
- 1731 Thomas Hull
- 1732 William Ruddel
- 1733 John Davis
- 1734 Daniel Floyd
- 1735 John Biggs
- 1736 John Hussey
- 1737 William Smith
- 1738 John Baker
- 1739 William Stone
- 1740 James Case
- 1741 Richard Samburn
- 1742 Matthew Pitts
- 1743 Robert Robbins
- 1744 John Talk
- 1745 Thomas Smith
- 1746 William Forty
- 1747 Thomas Baker
- 1748 Samuel Case
- 1749 John Thorpe
- 1750 Henry Brown
- 1751 James Wyatt
- 1751 John Case
- 1752 John Wansborough
- 1753 Nicholas Hicks
- 1754 Robert Powel
- 1755 John Maton
- 1756 Scrope Egerton
- 1757 John Blake
- 1758 William Hussey, clothier and MP
- 1759 Robert Wentworth
- 1760 Geoffrey Gowen
- 1761 William Talk
- 1762 James Bennett
- 1763 Edward Lambert
- 1764 Thomas Dennis
- 1765 John Gowan
- 1766 Joseph Wiles
- 1767 John Cooper, MP
- 1768 James Rothwell
- 1769 Sydenham Burrough
- 1770 Henry Penruddocke Wyndham, MP
- 1771 Robert Cooper
- 1772 John Tanner
- 1773 Rawlins Hillman
- 1774 John Edgar
- 1775 William Little
- 1776 John Elderton
- 1777 Thomas Hussy
- 1778 Nathaniel Wick
- 1779 Edward Eastman
- 1780 Joseph Hinxman
- 1781 William Stephens
- 1782 Nathaniel Still
- 1783 John Wyche
- 1784 Thomas Long
- 1785 James Easton
- 1786 George Maton
- 1787 Eadward Hinxman
- 1788 George Yalden Fort
- 1789 Henry Hinxman
- 1790 Michael Burrough from 18 Nov 1790
- 1791 Robert Freemantle
- 1792 James Goddard
- 1793 Thomas Brown
- 1794 Joseph Tanner
- 1795 William Boucher
- 1796 Thomas Goddard
- 1797 Joseph Tanner
- 1798 Paul Lagas Burnett
- 1799 Henry Smith

== 19th century ==
- 1800 William French
- 1801 Edward Stevens
- 1802 James Sutton
- 1803 Joseph Everett
- 1804 William Ghost
- 1805 John Pern Tinney
- 1806 Johnathan Fishlake
- 1807 Hezekiah Wyche
- 1808 Thomas Wilkie
- 1809 James Hussy
- 1810 John Pinkney
- 1811 Edward Davies
- 1812 William Bird Brodie
- 1813 William Andrews
- 1814 Charles George Brodie
- 1815 Rev. Christopher Rigby Collins
- 1816 William Woolfryes
- 1817 Henry Emley
- 1818 John Atkinson
- 1819 Joseph Tanner
- 1820 Thomas Webb Dyke
- 1821 Thomas Wynch
- 1822 George Atkinson
- 1823 Joseph Tanner
- 1824 Thomas Webb Dyke
- 1825 Thomas Wynch
- 1826 George Atkinson
- 1827 Joseph Bouverie Hussy Tanner
- 1828 Thomas Ogdon Stevens
- 1829 George Sutton
- 1830 John Pinkney
- 1831 William Fawcett
- 1832 John Beere
- 1833 John Lush Alford
- 1834–35 John Cother
- 1835–36 William Smith
- 1836–37 Charles Finch
- 1837–38 Alexander Lucas
- 1838–39 Richard Hetley
- 1839–40 Thomas Norwood Chubb
- 1840–41 Robert Mackrell
- 1841–42 William Blackmore
- 1842–43 William Corbin Finch MD
- 1843–44 James Hussey
- 1844–45 Edward Edmund Peach Kelsey
- 1845–46 William Brownjohn
- 1846–47 George Fulford
- 1847–48 Robert Farrant
- 1848–49 Robert Farrant
- 1849–50 Thomas Robert Moore MD
- 1850–51 George Brown
- 1851–52 Edward Edmund Peach Kelsey
- 1852–53 Edward Edmund Peach Kelsey
- 1853–54 John Lambert
- 1854–55 Thomas Pain
- 1855–56 Abraham Jackson
- 1856–57 Thomas Pain
- 1857–58 Coard William Squarey
- 1858–59 Philip Pickney Cother
- 1859–60 William Woodlands
- 1860–61 Philip Watson Ottoway
- 1861–62 Charles Mann Cornwallis Whatman
- 1862–63 John Style
- 1863–64 John Waters
- 1864–65 Richard Henry Rigden
- 1865–66 Robert Stokes
- 1866–67 John Alfred Lush MD
- 1867–68 Stephen Eldridge
- 1868–69 William Aylward
- 1869–70 Charles Richard Norton
- 1870–71 William Fawcett Jnr
- 1871–72 John Harding Jackson
- 1873–74 Henry Brown
- 1874–75 Samuel Ralph Atkins
- 1875–76 Charles Henry Radcliffe
- 1876–77 John Keynes
- 1877–78 Richard Monkhouse Wilson
- 1878–79 Joseph Williams Lovibond
- 1879–80 William Hicks
- 1880–81 Edward Frederick Kelsey
- 1881–82 William Leach
- 1882–83 Charles Moody
- 1883–84 Thomas Stephen Futcher
- 1884–85 George Fulford
- 1885–86 William Maxwell Hammick
- 1886–87 Frederick Griffen
- 1887–88 Edward Waters
- 1888–89 Samuel Parker
- 1889–90 George Nodder
- 1890–91 Joseph Williams Lovibond
- 1891–92 William Marlow
- 1892–93 Arthur Whitehead
- 1893–94 Charles Haskins
- 1894–95 Edward Foulger Pye Smith
- 1895–96 Arthur Russell Malden
- 1896–97 Arthur Whitehead
- 1897–98 Howard Harris
- 1898–99 Edward Alexander
- 1899–1900 David Stevens

== 20th century ==
- 1900–01 Henry George Gregory
- 1901–02 John Alfred Folliott
- 1902–03 Edward John Brittan
- 1903–04 Charles John Woodrow
- 1904–05 James Keith Dowden
- 1905–06 Frank Baker
- 1906–07 Samuel Grove
- 1907–08 Robert Michael Hall
- 1908–09 Tom Perkins
- 1909–10 Richard Arthur Wilson
- 1910–11 Frank Shepherd
- 1911–12 William Pritchard
- 1912–13 Frederick Sutton
- 1913–14 James Macklin
- 1914–15 James Macklin
- 1915–16 James Macklin
- 1916–17 James Macklin
- 1917–18 James Macklin
- 1918–19 James Macklin
- 1919–20 Howard Lapham
- 1920–21 Thomas William Berry
- 1921–22 Edward Sidney Humby
- 1922-22 Henry Bywater Medway
- 1922–23 Francis Herbert Wort
- 1923–24 Reuben Bracher
- 1924–25 Robert Bousie
- 1925–26 James Brothers
- 1926–27 John Cattrell Hudson
- 1927–28 Edith Maud Hulse (the first lady mayor)
- 1928–29 Alfred Salisbury-Jones
- 1929–30 Harry Medway
- 1930–31 Alfred Hinxman
- 1931–32 John Sidney Rambridge
- 1932–33 Gideon Hancock
- 1933–34 Edwin James Case
- 1934–35 Edward Herbert Major
- 1935–36 Charles Scammel
- 1936–37 Maurice Rawlence
- 1937–38 Charles Thomas
- 1938–39 William Cornelius Bridge
- 1939–40 William Cornelius Bridge
- 1940–41 Gerald Earl Thornton
- 1941–42 George Albert Berry
- 1942–43 Sidney Clarke
- 1943–44 Ernest Railton Grant
- 1944–45 Alfred Courtney
- 1945–46 Herbert Barber
- 1946–47 Fred Sanders
- 1947–48 Roland Graham Gordon
- 1948–49 Stanley Narcissus Bigwood
- 1949–50 Horace Edward Randall
- 1950–51 Arthur Albert Maidment
- 1951–52 George Chivers Whatley
- 1952–53 William James Rothwell
- 1953–54 Hedley John Annetts
- 1954–55 Francis James Moore
- 1955–56 Charles Joseph Lee
- 1956–57 Edward Percy Adlam
- 1957–58 Alfred Edward Batt
- 1958–59 Arthur Albert Maidment
- 1959–60 William James Rothwell
- 1960–61 Harold Reginald Kidwell
- 1961 Arthur Christopher Hoy
- 1961–62 Stanley Arthur Vokes
- 1962–63 Harold Gordon Batt
- 1964–65 Alfred Henry Crane
- 1965–66 William Eric Glazebrook
- 1966–67 William Stephen Biddle
- 1967–68 Beatrice Dorothy Brown
- 1968–69 Stewart Anthony Snook
- 1969–70 Margaret Josephine Benson
- 1970–71 William Hezekiah Lambert
- 1972–73 Hilda Elizabeth Barker
- 1973–74 George William Shingler
- 1974–75 Francis William Grandfield
- 1975–76 George Hubert Anthony Stocken
- 1976–77 Timothy Sherwood Hattersley
- 1977–78 Ivan Cecil Light
- 1978–79 Arthur Walter James Lawrence
- 1979–80 Kenneth Anthony Edwards
- 1980–81 Douglas Anthony Stephenson
- 1981–82 Derek Ashton Alford
- 1982–83 Beverly Head
- 1983–84 Peter John Dalton
- 1984–85 Pamela Irene Edwards
- 1985–86 Thomas Cameron Cowie
- 1986–87 William John Quirke McGrath
- 1987–88 Elizabeth Margaret Grant
- 1988–89 Pauline Denise D Stocken
- 1989–90 Margaret Mary Jackson
- 1990–91 Kathleen Cooper Joel
- 1991–92 Gloria Celia Tudhope
- 1992–93 Dorothy Joan Jones
- 1993–94 Peter Noel Chubb
- 1994–95 Patricia Mary Errington Rycroft
- 1995–96 Richard Terrence Rogers
- 1996–97 Beryl Mary Jay
- 1997–98 Paul Sample
- 1998–99 Olwen Tanner
- 1999–2000 David McCarthy

== 21st century ==
- 2000–01 Steve Fear
- 2001–02 Ian Tomes
- 2002–03 Sue Mallory
- 2003–04 Bobbie Chettleburgh
- 2004–05 Jeremy Nettle
- 2005–06 Patrick Paisey
- 2006–07 Sheila Warrander
- 2007–08 Kevin Cardy
- 2008–09 Iris Evans
- 2009–10 Bobbie Chettleburgh
- 2010–11 Brian Dalton
- 2011–12 John Abbott
- 2012–13 John Collier
- 2013–14 Penny Brown
- 2014–15 Jo Broom
- 2015–16 Andrew Roberts
- 2016–17 Derek Brown
- 2017–18 John Lindley
- 2018–19 Mike Osment
- 2019–21 John Walsh
- 2021–22 Caroline Corbin
- 2022–23 Tom Corbin
- 2023–24 Atiqul Hoque
- 2024–25 Sven Hocking
- 2025–26 John Wells
- 2026–27 Jenny Bolwell
