= Giles Tooker =

English lawyer and politician

Giles Tooker (c 1565 – 25 November 1623) was an English lawyer and politician who sat in the House of Commons between 1601 and 1614.

Tooker was the son of Charles Tooker, yeoman of Maddingley and his wife Matilda Nipperhead. His father died in 1571 when he was six leaving him well endowed financially. He was educated at Barnard's Inn and entered Lincoln's Inn in 1581. In 1589, he was called to the bar. He was a member of counsel to Salisbury in 1591.

In 1601, Tooker was elected Member of Parliament for Salisbury. He was re-elected MP for Salisbury in 1604. He led the movement for the emancipation of Salisbury and when it was incorporated in 1611, he became the first recorder of the city, holding office until his death. He was also recorder of Wilton. In 1614, he was re-elected MP for Salisbury. He was treasurer of his inn from 1617 to 1618.

When he died at the age of about 67, Tooker owned property in Maydenton, Madington, Burton, Hammington, Charleton, Chesenbury, Bulkington and Eston as well as his house in Salisbury.

Tooker married Elizabeth Eyre, daughter of Thomas Eyre of Salisbury on 9 September 1586 and had two sons and two daughters.

Parliament of England
Preceded by Thomas Eyre; Giles Hutchens	Member of Parliament for Salisbury; 1601–1614; With: John Puxton; Richard Godfrey; Roger Gauntlett	Succeeded by Roger Gauntlett; Thomas Hussey
