= David White =

David or Dave White may refer to:

== Entertainment ==
- David White, better known as David Jason (born 1940), English actor and comedian
- David White (actor) (1916–1990), American television actor, Bewitched
- David White (musician) (1939–2019), doo-wop singer, Danny and the Juniors
- David A. R. White (born 1970), American television actor, Evening Shade
- David C. White (born 1982), American television writer and producer
- Dave White (writer, born 1979), American novelist
- David White, American singer for heavy metal band Heathen
- David White (make-up artist), British film make-up artist
- David White (sound editor), Australian film sound editor
- David Patillo White (1828–1903), singing teacher and composer
- David R. White, American director of Dance Theater Workshop

== Politics ==
- David White (Kentucky politician) (1785–1834), representative from Kentucky
- David Frank White (1850–1897), served in the Virginia House of Delegates
- David White (MP), Member of Parliament (MP) for Salisbury, 1378–1388
- David White (Australian politician) (born 1944), Member of the Victorian Legislative Council from 1976–1996 and a member of the Kirner Ministry

== Sports ==
- David White (baseball) (born 1961), American-Australian baseball player
- David White (New Zealand cricketer) (born 1961), New Zealand batsman
- David White (English cricketer) (born 1967), English cricketer
- David White (English footballer) (born 1967), for Manchester City
- David White (Scottish footballer) (1933–2013), footballer and manager, Rangers F.C.
- David White (South African cricketer) (born 1991), South African cricketer

== Other ==
- David Dunnels White (1844–1924), Medal of Honor recipient
- David Renfrew White (1847–1937), New Zealand university professor
- David White (geologist) (1862–1935), American
- David E. White (born 1938), U.S. Navy admiral
- David Gordon White (born 1953), American religious historian
- David White (officer of arms) (born 1961), British heraldist and genealogist
- David White (steamboat), boilers exploded 1867

== See also ==
- David Whyte (disambiguation)
- David Wight (disambiguation)
