= Francis Swanton =

English lawyer and politician

Francis Swanton (c.1605 – 1661) was an English lawyer and politician who sat in the House of Commons from 1660 to 1661.

Swanton was the son of William Swanton of Wincanton, Somerset and his wife Elizabeth Aubrey, daughter of Thomas Aubrey of Chaddenwicke, Wiltshire. He was a student of Middle Temple in 1630 and was called to the bar in 1638. He was Clerk of assize for the Western circuit from 1637 to 1656, J.P. for Wiltshire from about 1641 until his death and J.P. for Somerset from 1648 to 1657. His small estate was sequestrated because he had acted as clerk of assize under the Royalists during the Civil War but he managed to convincedthe sequestrators that he had acted under force majeure and was not only excused the fine but also allowed to continue in post. He was commissioner for assessment for Wiltshire from December 1649 to 1652 and was J.P. for Cornwall, Devon and Hampshire in 1651. In 1655 he was commissioner for oyer and terminer for the Western circuit. He was commissioner for assessment for Wiltshire in 1657, and commissioner for assessment for Wiltshire and Salisbury from January 1660 until his death.

In 1660, Swanton was elected Member of Parliament for Wilton in the Convention Parliament. He was commissioner for oyer and terminer, Western circuit in July 1660. In 1661 he was elected MP for Salisbury in the Cavalier Parliament.

Swanton died at the age of about 56 in 1661 for on 20 November 1661 his post as Clerk of Assize was vacant.

Swanton married firstly Prudence Povey, daughter of Laurence Povey of North Mimms, Hertfordshire and had at least three sons and two daughters. He married secondly by licence dated 3 July 1661 Philippa Phillipps, widow of James Phillipps, pewterer, of St. Magnus Corner, New Fish Street, London and daughter of William Povey, dyer of All Hallows the Less, London.

Parliament of England
Preceded by Not represented in Restored Rump	Member of Parliament for Wilton; 1660; With: Richard Howe	Succeeded by John Nicholas; Thomas Mompesson
Preceded by Edward Tooker; Henry Eyre	Member of Parliament for Salisbury; 1661; With: Edward Tooker	Succeeded by Edward Tooker; Stephen Fox
