= William Webbe (disambiguation) =

William Webbe (born 1550), English critic and translator.

William Webbe may also refer to:

- William Webbe alias Kellowe (by 1466 – 1523), MP for Salisbury
- William Webbe (by 1499 – 1554), MP for Salisbury
- William Webbe (by 1508 – c. 1547), MP for Huntingdon
- William Webbe (fl. 1542), MP for Warwick
- William Webbe (died 1585), MP for Salisbury
- William Webbe (mayor) (died 1599), Lord Mayor of London
- William Harold Webbe (1885–1965), British politician

== See also ==
- William Webb (disambiguation)
