= John Wallop (disambiguation) =

Sir John Wallop (c. 1490–1551) was an English soldier and diplomat.

John Wallop may also refer to:

- John Wallop, 1st Earl of Portsmouth (1690–1762), British peer and Member of Parliament
- John Wallop, 2nd Earl of Portsmouth (1742–1797), British nobleman
- John Wallop, 3rd Earl of Portsmouth (1767–1853), British nobleman and lunatic
- John Wallop (died 1405), MP for Salisbury
- John Wallop, Viscount Lymington (1718–1749), British politician
