= Chaffyn =

Chaffyn is a surname. Notable people with the surname:

- Edward Chaffyn, Member of Parliament in 1542
- Thomas Chaffyn (disambiguation), multiple people

== See also ==
- Chaffin
