= Sir Walter Long, 1st Baronet of Whaddon =

English politician

Sir Walter Long, 1st Baronet of Whaddon (1592 – 15 November 1672) was an English politician.

== Early life ==
The second son of Henry Long (1564–1612) and Rebecca Bailey, Long was educated at Lincoln's Inn. He had inherited no land at his father's death, but when his elder brother Henry died in 1621, he inherited the extensive but heavily encumbered family estates.

On 26 December 1621 he married Mary Coxe (died 1631) and by 1623 his debts had increased alarmingly. With the assistance of his father-in-law he obtained a seat for Salisbury in the 1625 Parliament, possibly as a means to avoid his creditors. He was elected to Parliament in 1626 as Knight of the Shire for Wiltshire.

== Parliamentary career ==
Long was a vocal supporter of the remonstrance defending the House of Commons against the charge of unparliamentary proceedings, and played an active part in supporting Pembroke's attack on the Duke of Buckingham. In several speeches he questioned the duke's Protestantism and implied that the duke was involved in precipitating the death of James I.

In an attempt to prevent Long's return to Parliament in 1628, the crown picked him as High Sheriff of Wiltshire, but nevertheless he managed to secure a seat for Bath in Somerset, arguing on tentative legal grounds that since the constituency lay outside his county, he was not breaking the law. His continuing opposition to Buckingham finally resulted in his prosecution in October 1628 in a Star Chamber suit, and it was argued that Long had not only acted unlawfully in securing his election but also neglected his duties as Sheriff of Wiltshire.

Hoping to avoid censure, Long quickly withdrew to Wiltshire but returned to Parliament for the 1629 session. In the tumultuous scenes on 2 March, he took a leading part when the Speaker, John Finch, was forcibly held down in his chair, preventing adjournment of the House. Together with six others, he was arrested for offences committed within the House and appeared before the King's Bench, while simultaneously facing ongoing Star Chamber proceedings concerning his shrievalty.

Attempts by his counsel and sympathetic friends to secure his release were unsuccessful, despite his appeals for clemency. Initially he agreed to be bound over, but he retracted on learning that the other prisoners had refused to be bailed. He was fined 2000 marks and imprisoned in the Tower until his release in 1633, by which time his first wife had died.

That year he married secondly, Anne Foxe (née Cage; died 1665). To pay his fine, Long was forced to sell much of his Wiltshire property, living for most of the 1630s on the Shropshire estates of his second wife. In December 1641 he was elected to the Long Parliament as member for Ludgershall, Wiltshire, and a sympathetic Parliament voted him £5,000 as an indemnity, "for his damages, losses, imprisonments and sufferings." However he was exempted from the Royal Pardon in November the following year because of his continuing opposition to the court, and particularly the writ of ship money.

== Civil War ==
Long took an active part in Parliament's cause during the civil war and after being severely wounded at the Battle of Edgehill, he raised a troop of horse and helped to organise Parliamentary forces in Wiltshire and Shropshire. He was Chief Register in Chancery but as a prominent member of the Presbyterian faction in the House of Commons, he acquired a degree of notoriety and he twice assaulted members who disputed his views.

In 1647 Long was one of eleven Presbyterian members the army sought to remove from Parliament. He escaped to France and joined with a group of royalists and disaffected parliamentarians. While abroad it is not certain what role, if any, he played in promoting the royalist cause, but the political tide was turning and he returned to England in late 1659. He was given a baronetcy in 1661 after the restoration of the monarchy. He married on 2 January 1666 his third wife, Anne Cotes (died 1688). A portrait of Long, "set about with diamonds," now lost, was referred to in her will.

== Family and death ==
He had six children from his first marriage, including Rebecca, who married Sir Philip Parker, 1st Baronet.

Long died on 15 November 1672 at Whaddon, Wiltshire, where he was later buried. He was succeeded in the baronetcy by his son from his first marriage, Walter (1627–1710) who died without issue, and the title became extinct.

Parliament of England
Preceded by Henry Sherfield; Roger Gauntlett	Member of Parliament for Salisbury; 1625; With: Henry Sherfield	Succeeded by Henry Sherfield; John Puxton
Preceded by Sir Henry Ley; Sir Francis Seymour	Member of Parliament for Wiltshire; 1626; With: Henry Poole	Succeeded by Sir William Button, Bt; Sir Francis Seymour
Preceded by Richard Gray; William Chapman	Member of Parliament for Bath; 1628–1629; With: John Popham	Parliament suspended until 1640
Preceded by William Ashburnham; Sir John Evelyn	Member of Parliament for Ludgershall; 1641–1648; With: Sir John Evelyn	Unrepresented after Pride's Purge
Baronetage of England
New creation	Baronet (of Whaddon); 1661–1672	Succeeded by Walter Long
