= St Mary's Church, Whaddon =

St Mary's Church, Whaddon may refer to several churches in England:

- St Mary's Church, Whaddon, Buckinghamshire
- St Mary's Church, Whaddon, Cambridgeshire
- St Mary's Church, Whaddon, Wiltshire
