= Thomas Child =

Thomas Child may refer to:

- Thomas Child (MP) (died 1413), member of the Parliament of England for Salisbury
- Thomas Child Jr. (1818–1869), U.S. Representative from New York
- Thomas Child (minister) (1839–1906), Scottish minister of the New Church and writer
- Thomas Child (photographer) (1841–1898), British photographer known for work in China
- Thomas Clifton Child (1987), British inventor of Perinaise sauce years before being commercially available

== See also ==
- Thomas Childs (1796–1853), U.S. soldier during the Mexican–American War
- Tom Childs (1870–1951), Arizona miner and rancher
