= Henry Eyre (barrister) =

English lawyer and politician

Henry Eyre (23 October 1628 – 18 July 1678) was an English lawyer and politician who sat in the House of Commons at various times between 1659 and 1678.

Eyre was the son of Giles Eyre, of Brickworth, Whiteparish, Wiltshire and his wife Jane Snelgrove, daughter of Ambrose Snelgrove of Redlynch, Wiltshire. He was a student of Lincoln's Inn in 1647 and became a fellow of Jesus College, Oxford in 1648. He was awarded BA on 26 June 1649, became a fellow of Merton College, Oxford in 1651 and was awarded MA on 18 November 1652. He was called to the bar in 1653. In 1659, he was Recorder of Salisbury and was elected Member of Parliament for Salisbury in the Third Protectorate Parliament.

In 1660, Eyre was re-elected MP for Salisbury in the Convention Parliament. In 1675, he was elected MP for Downton and held the seat until his death.

Eyre died in 1678 at the age of 49 and was buried at Whiteparish.

Eyre married in about 1658, Dorothy Dodington, widow of Christopher Dodington of Lincoln's Inn and Horsington, Somerset, and daughter of Sir George Hastings of Woodlands.

Parliament of England
Preceded by William Stone; James Heeley; Edward Tooker	Member of Parliament for Salisbury; 1659; With: Humphrey Ditton	Succeeded by John Dove
