= Sir Walter Long, 2nd Baronet of Whaddon =

Sir Walter Long, 2nd Baronet (1627 – 21 May 1710) was born in Wiltshire, the son of Sir Walter Long, 1st Baronet of Whaddon and his wife Mary Cox.

He inherited the manor of Whaddon from his father in 1672, and three years later Rodmarton, his brother Robert's inheritance from their father (formerly owned by Robert Cox, father of Mary). In 1660 Walter's father had built a large addition to Whaddon House, which was surrounded by parkland. This manor house was destroyed by fire in the 19th century. Whaddon Grove Farm now stands on the site of the House, there remains a 17th-century back door in a moulded frame, and there are two stone former dairies. These two properties, together with most of the rest of his estates, descended to his nephew Calthorpe Parker Long (son of Sir Philip Parker, 1st Baronet). In 1706 Long purchased an estate in Sutton Veny, Wiltshire, which included Polebridge Farm. This eventually passed to Walter Long (of South Wraxall).

He was Member of Parliament for Bath from 1679 (the Habeas Corpus Parliament) to 1681.

Walter Long, 2nd Baronet, died unmarried at his house in James Street, Covent Garden, London, and the baronetcy became extinct.

Baronetage of England
Preceded by Walter Long	Baronet (of Whaddon); 1672–1710	Extinct
Parliament of England
Preceded by Sir George Speke; Sir William Bassett	Member of Parliament for Bath; 1679–1681; With: Sir George Speke	Succeeded by The Viscount Fitzhardinge; Sir William Bassett
