= William Webb =

William or Bill Webb may refer to:

== Politicians ==
- William Benning Webb (1825–1896), American politician and attorney
- William C. Webb (1824–1898), member of the Wisconsin State Assembly and the Kansas House of Representatives
- William George Webb (1843–1905), British member of parliament for Kingswinford, 1900–1905
- William Hoste Webb (1820–1890), Quebec lawyer and political figure
- William R. Webb (1842–1926), U.S. senator from Tennessee
- William Wilson Webb (1826–1894), Ontario businessman and political figure
- William Webb (Victorian politician) (1842–1911), MP in the Victorian Legislative Assembly, 1889–1904

== Sports ==
- B. W. Webb (William Wilson Webb Jr., born 1990), American football cornerback
- William Webb (boxer) (1882–1949), British Olympic bronze medal (1908) bantamweight boxer
- William Webb (rower) (1880–1960), New Zealand World Champion rower
- Bill Webb (pitcher) (1913–1994), Major League Baseball player
- Bill Webb (rugby union) (1868–c. 1931), Australian rugby union player
- Bill Webb (Australian footballer) (1883–1947), Australian rules footballer
- Bill Webb (second baseman) (1895–1943), Major League Baseball player
- William Earl Webb (1897–1965), Major League Baseball outfielder
- William Webb (cricketer, born 1872) (1872–1913), New Zealand cricketer
- William Webb (cricketer, born 1898) (1898–1969), English cricketer
- William Webb (diver) (1862–?), British Olympic diver
- Willie Webb (footballer) (1906-1984), Scottish footballer, see List of AFC Bournemouth players (25–99 appearances)
- Willie Webb, football referee, see Ireland national football team (FAI) results

== Musicians ==
- Boogie Bill Webb (1924–1990), American blues guitarist and singer
- Chick Webb (William Henry Webb, 1905–1939), American jazz and swing musician
- William Webb (composer) (c. 1600–1657), English musician and song composer

== Others ==
- Sir William Webb (judge) (1887–1972), Australian judge
- William A. Webb (1824–1881), American Civil War sailor
- Suhaib Webb (William Webb, born 1972), American Islamic activist
- William Alfred Webb (1878–1936), American and Australian railway administrator
- William Frederick Webb (1829–1899), wealthy British land owner
- William H. Webb (1816–1899), American shipbuilder, naval architect, industrialist and philanthropist
- William James Webbe or Webb (1830–1904), English painter
- William J. Webb (born 1957), Canadian egalitarian theologian known for his 'redemptive-movement' hermeneutic
- William Seward Webb (1851–1926), American doctor, financier, railroad president, and well-connected businessperson
- William Snyder Webb (1882–1964), American anthropologist
- William Trego Webb (1847–1934), educationist and author
- William Walter Webb (1857–1933), American Episcopal bishop
- Bill Webb (game designer), role-playing game designer
- William Webb (naturalist) (1834?–1897), Australian collector and trader of plants and animals
- William Webb (priest) (1825–1896), Archdeacon of Grenada
- William Webb (Master of Clare College, Cambridge) (1775–1856), English academic
- William Wilfrid Webb (1857–1911), English officer and physician in the Bengal Army and the Indian Medical Service
- William Webb (engineer) (born 1967), British telecommunications engineer

== See also ==
- Billy Webb's Amazing Stories, CBBC mini-series
- William Webb Ellis (1806–1872), English Anglican clergyman; the man who is said to have invented rugby
- William Webb Follett (1796–1845), English lawyer
- William Webb Venable (1880–1948), U.S. representative from Mississippi
- William Webbe (disambiguation)
