= Waryn =

Waryn is a surname. Notable people with the surname include:

- Henry Waryn, MP for Huntingdonshire
- John Waryn, 15th century archdeacon
- William Waryn, MP for Salisbury

== See also ==
- Warren (disambiguation)
