= Thomas Chaffin =

Thomas Chafin, Chaffin or Chaffyn may refer to:

- Thomas Chaffyn I (died 1558), MP for Salisbury 1529
- Thomas Chaffyn II (died 1559), MP for Salisbury 1555 and Heytesbury 1554
- Thomas Chaffin, High Sheriff of Dorset in 1579
- Thomas Chaffin, High Sheriff of Dorset in 1590
- Thomas Chafin (1650–1691), MP for Poole 1679–87, Dorchester 1689 and Hindon 1690–1
- Thomas Chafin (1675–1711), MP for Shaftesbury 1699–1701 and Dorset 1702–11
