= Granville Ryder =

Granville Ryder may refer to:

- Granville Ryder (1799–1879), British politician
- Granville Ryder (1833–1901), British politician, son of the above
