= Maddington =

Maddington may refer to

- Maddington, Wiltshire, England, a former civil parish now part of the parish of Shrewton
- Maddington, Western Australia, a suburb in Australia
- Maddington, Quebec, a canton of Quebec in Canada
