= Thomas Burford =

14th-century English politician

Thomas Burford (died before 1406) was the member of the Parliament of England for Salisbury for multiple parliaments from January 1380 to 1394. He was also mayor of Salisbury.
