= John Abarough =

English politician

Master John Abarough

Mayor of Salisbury
- In office 1517–1517
- Preceded by: Thomas Coke
- Succeeded by: Thomas Brodegate

Member of Parliament for Salisbury
- In office 1515–1515

Member of Parliament for Salisbury
- In office 1523–1523

Personal details
- Born: by 1483
- Died: 1540 or later

John Abarough or Barow (by 1483 – 1540 or later), of Salisbury, Wiltshire, was an English politician.

== Career ==
Abarough was Mayor of Salisbury in 1517 and elected a Member of Parliament for Salisbury 1515 and 1523.
