= Beckingham =

Beckingham may refer to:

- Beckingham, Lincolnshire, England
- Beckingham, Nottinghamshire, England
  - Beckingham railway station, defunct railway station in Nottinghamshire
- Rowneybury House, Hertfordshire, England, otherwise known as Beckingham Palace
- Beckingham (surname), people with the surname
