= Robert Bower (died 1606) =

English politician

Robert Bower (died 1606), was an English politician.

A younger son of Thomas Bower of West Lavington, Wiltshire, he was elected Mayor of Salisbury for 1584–85.

He was a member (MP) of the parliament of England for Salisbury in 1593.

He married twice and had 8 daughters.
