= Thomas Mason (MP) =

Member of the Parliament of England

Thomas Mason (fl. early 1400s) was the member of the Parliament of England for Salisbury for the parliament of October 1416. He was a clothier. He was also mayor of Salisbury and of Old Sarum.
