= Hugh Tucker =

English politician (c. 1537-c. 1586)

Hugh Tucker (c. 1537 – c. 1586) was an English politician.

He was a member (MP) of the parliament of England for Salisbury in 1572.
