= David Whyte =

David Whyte may refer to:

- David Whyte (footballer) (1971–2014), English footballer
- David Whyte (poet) (born 1955), Anglo-Irish poet
- David Whyte (tennis), Australian tennis player

== See also ==
- David White (disambiguation)
