= Richard Juel =

Member of the Parliament of England

Richard Juel (died 1410) was the member of the Parliament of England for Salisbury for the parliaments of September 1397 and October 1404.
