= Robert Griffith (MP) =

16th-century English politician

Robert Griffith (1501/1502 – 1568) was an English politician.

Griffith was the mayor of Salisbury in 1545. He was a member (MP) of the parliament of England for Salisbury in April 1554 and November 1554.
