= William Bailey (MP) =

Member of the Parliament of England

William Bailey (died 1409) was a draper and a Member of Parliament for Salisbury in 1406. He was elected to serve in the Parliament of 1410, but died in November 1409, before the Parliament assembled. It is not known if a replacement was elected.
