= Henry Man (MP) =

English politician

Henry Man (fl. 1415–1429), of Salisbury, Wiltshire, was an English politician.

He was a member (MP) of the parliament of England for Salisbury in 1415, March 1416, 1422, 1425, 1426 and 1429. He was Mayor of Salisbury in 1402.
