= William Boyton =

Member of the Parliament of England

William Boyton, also known as William Bower, was the member of the Parliament of England for Salisbury for the parliaments of 1402 and 1406.
