= Robert Eyre (by 1518 – 1570 or later) =

English politician

Robert Eyre (by 1518 – 1570 or later) was an English politician.

Eyre was mayor of Salisbury in 1558–59. He was a member (MP) of the parliament of England for Salisbury in 1558 and Weymouth in 1563.
