= William Warmwell =

Member of the Parliament of England

William Warmwell (died 1423) was the member of the Parliament of England for Salisbury for multiple parliaments from February 1383 to 1395. He was also reeve, coroner, and mayor of Salisbury.
