= John Hooper (MP for Salisbury) =

English politician

John Hooper (c. 1532 – 1572) was an English politician.

He was a member (MP) of the parliament of England for Salisbury in October 1553, November 1554, 1555 and 1558.
