= Anthony Weekes =

16th-century English politician

Anthony Weekes (died 1573) was an English politician.

He was a member (MP) of the parliament of England for Salisbury in 1563. In 1565, he was mayor of Salisbury.
