= Beckingham (surname) =

Beckingham or De Beckingham is a surname of English origin, derived from the parishes of the same name in Lincolnshire and Nottinghamshire.

People with the surname include:

- Charles Beckingham (1699–1731), English poet and dramatist
- Charles Fraser Beckingham (1914–1998), British orientalist
- Elias Beckingham (died 1307), English judge
- John Beckingham (1510–1566), English politician, MP for Salisbury
- Peter Beckingham (born 1949), British diplomat and Governor of the Turks and Caicos Islands
- Steven Beckingham (born 1978), English actor

People born with the surname but known by other names include:

- Anne Dudley (born 1956), musician (Art of Noise) and film score composer, born Anne Beckingham
- Simon Pegg (born 1970), English actor, born Simon Beckingham
- Bobby Valentino (born 1954), English musician, born Robert Beckingham
