= Thomas Chaffyn II =

16th-century English politician

Thomas Chaffyn (1519–1559) was an English politician.

== Family ==
Chaffyn was the son of Salisbury MP Thomas Chaffyn. He married Sybil South, the daughter of Salisbury MP, Robert South.

== Career ==
In 1547, he was Mayor of Salisbury. He was a member (MP) of the parliament of England for Heytesbury in November 1554 and Salisbury in 1555.
