= Christopher Weekes (MP) =

English politician

Christopher Weekes (died 1596) was an English politician.

He was a member (MP) of the parliament of England for Salisbury in 1584, 1586 and 1589.
