= 1869 Salisbury by-election =

UK parliamentary by-election

The 1869 Salisbury by-election was fought on 5 August 1869. The by-election was fought due to the resignation of the incumbent MP of the Liberal Party, Edward William Terreck Hamilton. Liberal candidate Alfred Seymour, campaigning in support of Mr. Gladstone's policies, won the election.

Salisbury by-election, August 1869
Party	Candidate	Votes	%	±%
Liberal	Alfred Seymour	571	47.11	
Conservative	Granville Ryder	557	45.96	
Adullamite	M.H. Marsh	84	6.93	
Majority		16	1,15	
Turnout		1,212		
