= John Abyn =

16th-century English politician

- Born: 1523
- Died: 1559 (aged 35–36)
- Occupation: politician
- Known for: Member of Parliament for Salisbury

John Abyn (by 1523 – 1558 or 1559), of Salisbury, Wiltshire, was an English politician.

== Career ==
Abyn was a Member of Parliament for Salisbury in October 1553 and April 1554.
