= William Walters (MP) =

Member of the Parliament of England

William Walters (died 1417) was a cloth merchant and the member of the Parliament of England for Salisbury for the parliament of 1399. He was also reeve and mayor or Salisbury.
