= John Bitterley =

Member of the Parliament of England

John Bitterley (died c. 1396) was the member of the Parliament of England for Salisbury for the parliaments of January 1377, January 1380, February 1383, April 1384, February 1388, January 1390, 1393, and 1394. He was also mayor of Salisbury.
