= Henry Coldston =

16th-century English politician

Henry Coldston or Goldstone (by 1498–1547), was an English politician. He was Mayor of Salisbury from 1537–1538. He was a member (MP) of the parliament of England for Salisbury in 1539.

== Early life ==
Henry Coldston was christened near Warminster, Wiltshire.

== Later life ==
He was buried at St. Edmund's church.
