= Alan Campbell Johnson =

British politician (1913–1998)

Wing Commander Alan Campbell Johnson CIE OBE
- Born: 16 July 1913
- Died: 25 January 1998 (aged 84)
- Occupations: Military officer, journalist, author
- Military career
- Allegiance: United Kingdom
- Branch: Royal Air Force
- Service years: 1941–1958
- Rank: Wing Commander
- Conflicts: Second World War
- Awards: Officer of the Order of the British Empire

Alan Campbell-Johnson CIE OBE (16 July 1913 – 25 January 1998) was a British Liberal Party politician, journalist, author and public relations consultant. He notably worked on the staff of Sir Archibald Sinclair and served as press attaché to Lord Mountbatten as Viceroy of India.

== Background ==
He was the son of James and Gladys Campbell-Johnson. He was educated at Westminster School and Christ Church, Oxford (scholar; BA 2nd Class). Hons Modern History, 1935; MA). He married, in 1938, Imogen Fay de la Tour Dunlap. They had one son and one daughter.

== Career ==
During the 1939–1945 war, Campbell Johnson enlisted in the Royal Air Force Volunteer Reserve in 1941 and received an emergency commission as an acting pilot officer in the Administrative and Special Duties Branch on 20 October. He was regraded pilot officer on 20 December, with promotion to war-substantive flying officer on 1 October 1942. He was promoted war-substantive flight lieutenant on 28 September 1944.

He served on the staff of Lord Mountbatten at Combined Operations Headquarters, S.E.A.C. in the RAF; CO HQ, 1942–43; HQ SACSEA (Wing Comdr i/c Inter-Allied Records Section), 1943–46. He rejoined Mountbatten's staff as press attaché when he became viceroy and governor-general of India, from 1947 to 1948. He was Chairman of Campbell-Johnson Ltd, Public Relations Consultants, from 1953 to 1978. He was Honorary Fellow of the Institute of Public Relations President from 1956 to 1957. He was director of Hill and Knowlton (UK) Ltd, from 1976 to 1985. He was Honorary DLitt Southampton in 1990.

=== Political career ===
He was political secretary to Sir Archibald Sinclair, Leader of the Liberal Party from 1937 to 1940. In 1936 he was adopted as Liberal prospective parliamentary candidate by Salisbury Liberal Association. Even though the Liberals had not contested the seat in 1935 they were thought to be the main challenger to the Conservatives. He was a supporter of a Popular Front advocated by Sir Stafford Cripps which urged electoral co-operation between the Liberal and Labour parties. With a general election expected for the Autumn of 1939, he had hopes of persuading the Labour party in Salisbury to allow him a free-run at the Conservative candidate. Due to the outbreak of war, the election did not take place. He was Liberal candidate for the Salisbury Division of Wiltshire at the 1945 General Election. He had to fly back from active service in Sri Lanka to fight the election campaign.

General Election 1945 Electorate 53,710
Party	Candidate	Votes	%	±%
Conservative	Maj. John Granville Morrison	16,742	44.0	
Labour	John Alan Lyde Caunter	12,344	32.5	
Liberal	Wing-Com. Alan Campbell Johnson	8,946	23.5	
Majority		4,398	11.6	
Turnout			70.8	
Conservative hold		Swing		

He was Liberal candidate again for the Salisbury Division of Wiltshire at the 1950 General Election.

General Election 1950 Electorate: 45,958
Party	Candidate	Votes	%	±%
Conservative	John Granville Morrison	17,301	45.0	
Labour	Ald. WAJ Case	12,319	32.0	
Liberal	Alan Campbell-Johnson	8,847	23.0	
Majority		4,982	12.9	
Turnout			83.7	
Conservative hold		Swing		

== Awards and honours ==
He was awarded the OBE in 1946. He was awarded the Officer of US Legion of Merit in 1947.
