= Thomas Boner =

15th-century English politician

Thomas Boner (died 1422) was the member of the Parliament of England for Salisbury for the parliament of December 1421. He was also reeve and constable of Salisbury.
