= Giles Estcourt (died 1587) =

English politician

Giles Estcourt (died 1587), was an English politician.

He was a member (MP) of the parliament of England for Salisbury in 1563, 1571, 1572, 1584 and 1586.
