= Alfred Seymour =

British politician

Alfred Seymour MP
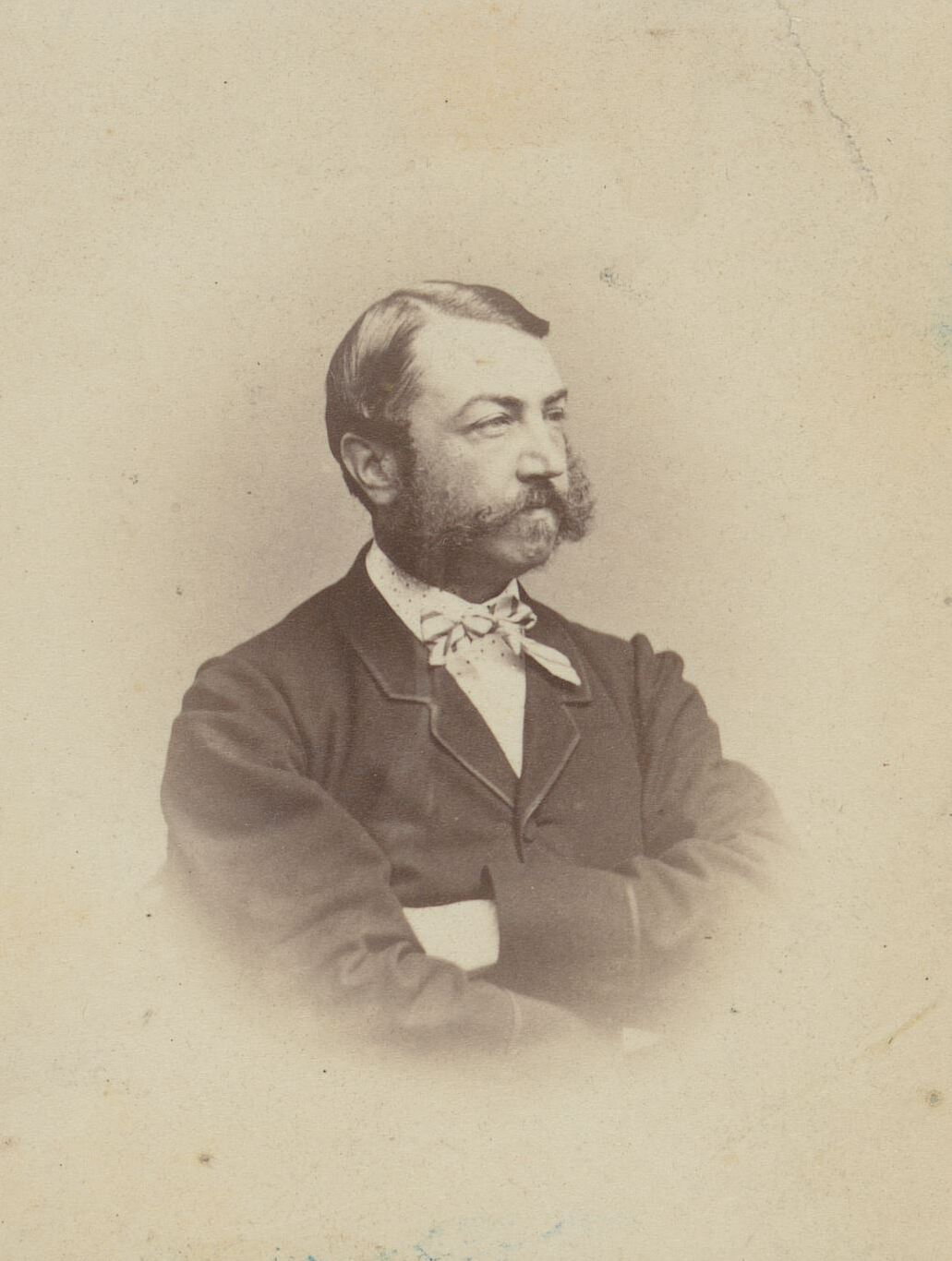
- Alfred Seymour
- Occupation: British Liberal Party politician
- Years active: Member of Parliament January 1863 until 1868; House of Commons 1864-1874
- Known for: Member of Parliament (MP) for Totnes

Alfred Seymour (11 November 1824 – 15 March 1888), of Knoyle House, East Knoyle, Wiltshire, and of Trent, Dorset, was a British Liberal Party politician.

== Background ==
He was a son of Henry Seymour of Knoyle House, Wiltshire, of Trent and of Northbrook and wife Jane Hopkinson, and brother of Henry Danby Seymour of Trent.

== Career ==
He was elected as a member of parliament (MP) for Totnes at a by-election in January 1863, and held the seat until the borough was disenfranchised in 1868. He returned to the House of Commons the following year, when he was elected at a by-election for Salisbury, campaigning in support of Mr. Gladstone's policies. He held that seat until his defeat at the 1874 general election.

Seymour was also a justice of the peace. He succeeded in Knoyle House, Wiltshire, in 1863.

== Family ==
He married on 18 August 1866 Isabella Leighton (d. 7 April 1911), daughter of Sir Baldwyn Leighton, 8th Baronet, and wife, and widow of Beriah Botfield of Hopton Court, Shropshire, Member of Parliament. They had one daughter, Jane Margaret Seymour (14 March 1873 – 5 August 1943), unmarried and without issue.

Parliament of the United Kingdom
| Preceded by The Earl of Gifford; John Pender | Member of Parliament for Totnes; 1863 – 1868; With: John Pender to 1866 | Constituency abolished |
| Preceded by Edward Hamilton; John Alfred Lush | Member of Parliament for Salisbury; 1869 – 1874; With: John Alfred Lush | Succeeded by Granville Ryder; John Alfred Lush |
