= William Bourer =

Member of the Parliament of England

William Bourer (died 1422) was a sheep farmer and the member of the Parliament of England for Salisbury for the parliament of 1410.
