= John Bayley (died 1611) =

English politician

John Bayley (died 1611) was an English politician.

Bayley was a prosperous merchant who owned houses in Gygon Street, Brown Street and Dragon Street in Salisbury itself as well as the nearby farm of Bishop's Down and the manor of Combe. He served on Salisbury city council, and became mayor of Salisbury in 1577. He was a member (MP) of the parliament of England for Salisbury in 1589.
