= David Wight =

David or Dave Wight may refer to:

- David Wight (cricketer) (born 1959), cricketer from the Cayman Islands
- David Wight (rower) (1934–2017), American gold medalist at the 1956 Melbourne Olympics
- Dave Wight, member of the band London

== See also ==
- David White (disambiguation)
