= Long baronets =

Extinct baronetcy in the Baronetage of England

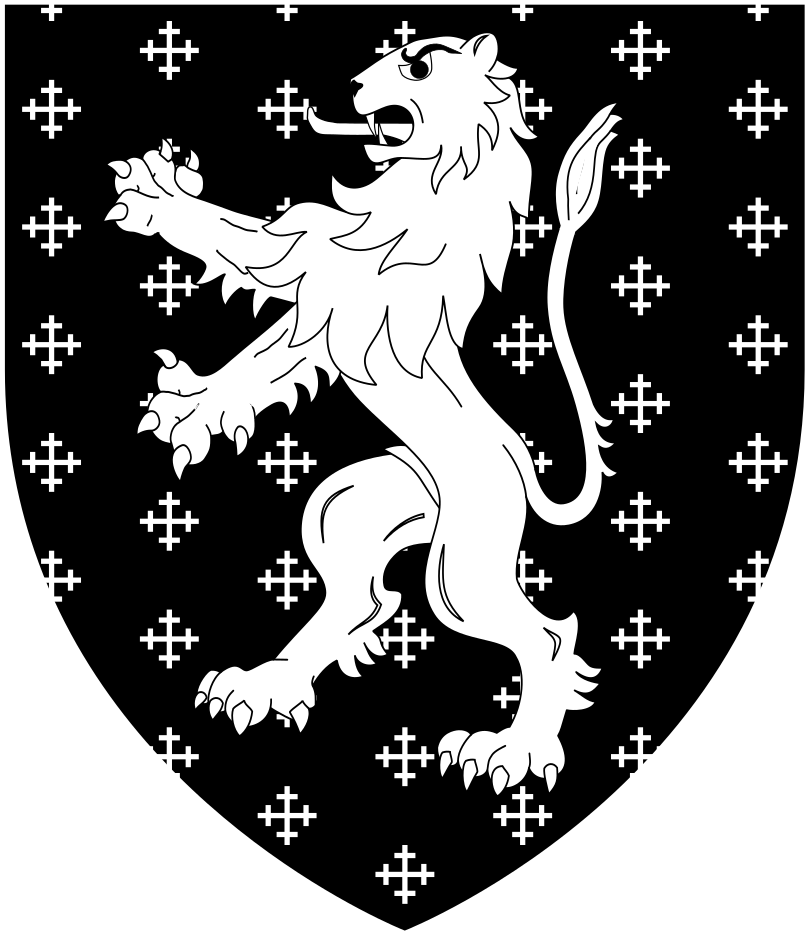
Arms of Long of South Wraxall: Sable semée of cross-crosslets, a lion rampant argent

There have been two baronetcies created for persons with the surname Long, both in the Baronetage of England. Both are extinct.

The Long Baronetcy, of Whaddon in the County of Wiltshire, was created in the Baronetage of England on 26 March 1661 for the politician Walter Long. He was succeeded by his son, the second Baronet. He was unmarried and the title became extinct on his death in 1710.

The Long, later Tylney-Long Baronetcy, of Westminster in the County of London, was created in the Baronetage of England on 1 September 1662. For more information on this creation, see Tylney-Long baronets.

== Long baronets, of Whaddon (1661) ==
- Sir Walter Long, 1st Baronet (1603–1672)
- Sir Walter Long, 2nd Baronet (1627–1710)

== Long, later Tylney-Long baronets, of Westminster (1662) ==
- see Tylney-Long baronets
