= Walter Shirley (MP) =

Member of the Parliament of England

Walter Shirley (died 1425) was a member of the Parliament of England for Salisbury for multiple parliaments from 1411 to 1423. He was also a reeve and mayor of Salisbury from 1408 to 1409 and 1416–1417 and a verderer of Clarendon forest.
