= John Becket =

Member of the Parliament of England

John Becket (died 1416) was a grocer and merchant, and the member of the Parliament of England for Salisbury for the parliaments of 1407 and April and November 1414. He was also reeve and mayor of Salisbury.
