= William Alexander (died 1446) =

English politician

William Alexander (died 1446), of Salisbury and Winterbourne Cherborough, Wiltshire, was an English politician.

He was a member (MP) of the parliament of England for Wiltshire in 1415 and for Salisbury in 1423, 1425, 1427, 1431 and 1432.
