= Charles Bulkeley =

16th-century English politician

Charles Bulkeley (by 1493–1549/1550), was an English politician.

He was a member (MP) of the parliament of England for Salisbury in 1542.
