= John Alfred Lush =

English Liberal politician

John Alfred Lush (21 March 1815 – 4 August 1888) was an English Liberal politician who sat in the House of Commons from 1868 to 1880.

Lush was the son of John Lush of Berwick St John, Wiltshire and his wife Martha Kelleway, daughter of James Kelleway of Donhead, Wiltshire. He was an M.D. of St Andrews University and became a general medical practitioner at Salisbury. He was a member of the Royal College of Physicians of London and one of the proprietors of Salisbury's Fisherton House Lunatic Asylum. He was a J.P. and an Alderman of Salisbury, of which city he was Mayor for 1866–67.

At the 1868 general election, Lush was elected Member of Parliament for Salisbury. He held the seat until 1880.

Lush died at the age of 73. He had married Sarah Martha Finch, daughter of W. C. Finch of Fisherton House, Salisbury, in May 1853.

Parliament of the United Kingdom
Preceded by Matthew Henry Marsh; Edward Hamilton	Member of Parliament for Salisbury; 1868 – 1880; With: Edward Hamilton to 1869; Alfred Seymour 1869; Granville Ryder 1869–1880	Succeeded by William Grenfell; John Passmore Edwards
