= Thomas Fleming (died 1624) =

English landowner and politician

Sir Thomas Fleming (c. 1572 – 19 February 1624) was an English landowner and politician who sat in the House of Commons at various times between 1601 and 1622.

Fleming was the son of Sir Thomas Fleming and his wife Mary James, the daughter of Dr Mark James. He was educated at Emmanuel College, Cambridge in 1586 and at Lincoln's Inn in 1590.

From about 1583 he was a J.P. for Hampshire and became a burgess of Southampton in 1599. In 1601, he was elected Member of Parliament for Winchester. When his father was made a judge in 1604, he replaced him as MP for Southampton and was knighted in 1605. He succeeded the estates of his father in 1613. In 1614 and 1621 he was re-elected MP for Southampton.

Fleming died at the age of about 52 and was buried at Stoneham near his mother, father and wife.

Fleming had married Dorothy, daughter of Sir Henry Cromwell of Hinchingbrooke, Huntingdonshire in about 1605. They had three sons and four daughters.

== Arms ==
Coat of arms of Thomas Fleming
Notes Recorded at the Visitation of London in 1568. Escutcheon Gules on a chevron between three owls Argent an ermine spot Sable.

Parliament of England
Preceded by William Badger; John Moore	Member of Parliament for Winchester; 1601; With: Edward Cole	Succeeded by John Moore; Edward Cole
Preceded by Sir Thomas Fleming; Sir John Jeffreys	Member of Parliament for Southampton c 1604–1622; With: Sir John Jeffreys - 1611; Thomas Cheeke 1614; Henry Sherfield	Succeeded by Sir John Mill, 1st Baronet; Henry Sherfield
