= John Levesham =

Member of the Parliament of England

John Levesham (died 1418) was the member of the Parliament of England for Salisbury for the parliaments of 1401 and 1404. A clothes merchant by profession, he held multiple important roles. He was a church-warden in Salisbury (circa 1395) and was also a tax collector in Wiltshire (circa 1388) and Salisbury (circa 1393). He was also a member of the Convocation of Salisbury by 1409. He was the reeve of Salisbury from 1396 to 1397 and held mayoral responsibilities from 1414 to 1415.
