= Edward Tooker =

English lawyer and politician

Edward Tooker JP
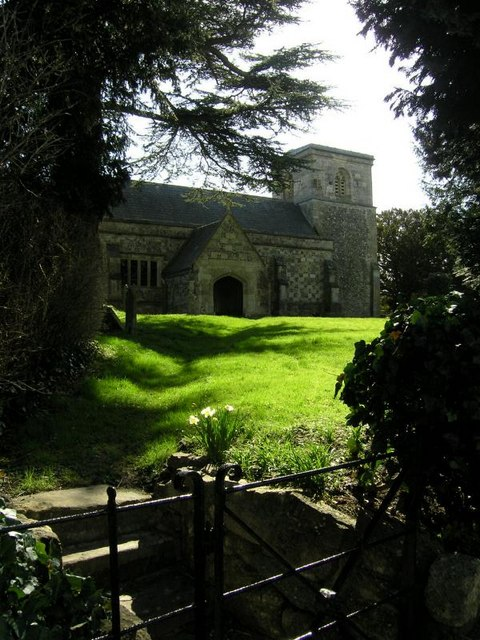
- St Mary's Church, Maddington, where Tooker was buried

Member of Parliament for Salisbury
- In office April 1660 – April 1664

Member of Parliament for Hindon
- In office January 1659 – April 1659

Member of Parliament for Salisbury
- In office September 1654 – January 1655

High Sheriff of Wiltshire
- In office 1648–1649

Personal details
- Born: c. 1592 Maddington, Wiltshire
- Died: 17 April 1664 (aged 71) Maddington, Wiltshire
- Spouse(s): (1) Martha Cooper (2) Mary Hungerford (1638–1654)
- Children: (1) Giles (1625–1676); Martha (died 1688); Philippa (1642–1703)
- Education: Lincoln's Inn

Edward Tooker (c. 1592 – 17 April 1664) was an English lawyer and politician from Wiltshire, who sat in the House of Commons at various times between 1654 and 1664. From 1631 to 1639, he was the legal guardian of his nephew Sir Anthony Ashley Cooper, who later described him as "a very honest, industrious man, an hospitable, prudent person, much valued and esteemed, dead and alive, by all that knew him".

== Personal details ==
Edward Tooker was born in Maddington, Wiltshire around 1592, eldest son of Giles Tooker (1558–1623), and his wife Elizabeth. His father was a lawyer, who became Recorder of Salisbury, and sat as MP for the county at various times from 1601 to 1614.

In 1616, he married Martha Cooper, sister of Sir John Cooper and aunt of Anthony Ashley Cooper, 1st Earl of Shaftesbury. They had three children before her death, Giles (1625–1676), Martha (died 1688), and Philippa (1642–1703). He married again in 1638, this time to a widow, Mary Platt; the second marriage was childless.

== Career ==
Tooker entered Lincoln's Inn in 1610, and qualified as a lawyer in 1616. In 1623 he succeeded to the estates of his father at Maddington.

Tooker became active in public life during the Wars of the Three Kingdoms, becoming the Parliamentarian commissioner for assessment and levying of money for Wiltshire in 1643. He held the same position from 1647 to 1652 and was High Sheriff of Wiltshire in 1648. He was commissioner for militia in 1648 and 1649. In 1651 he became a Justice of the Peace and in 1653 commissioner for the relief of poor prisoners. In 1654, he was elected Member of Parliament for Salisbury in the First Protectorate Parliament. He was commissioner for assessment for Wiltshire in 1657 and commissioner for militia in 1659. In 1659 he was elected as a Member for Hindon in the Third Protectorate Parliament. He was again commissioner for assessment for Wiltshire from January 1660 until his death and commissioner for militia in March 1660. In April 1660 he was again elected as a member of parliament for Salisbury in the Convention Parliament. He was commissioner for assessment for Salisbury from August 1660 until his death and commissioner for oyer and terminer on the Western circuit in July 1660. In 1661 he was re-elected as a member for Salisbury in the Cavalier Parliament and sat until his death.

Tooker died at the age of 71 and was buried at Maddington.

== Sources ==
- Lancaster, Henry (2010). TOOKER, Giles (c.1558-1623), of Maddington and Salisbury, Wilts. and Lincoln's Inn, London in The History of Parliament: the House of Commons 1604-1629. CUP. ISBN 978-1107002258.
- Helms, M.W; Ferris, John (1983). TOOKER, Edward (c.1592-1664), of Maddington, Wilts. in The History of Parliament: the House of Commons 1660-1690. Boydell and Brewer. ISBN 978-1107002258.

Parliament of England
Preceded by Not represented in Barebones Parliament	Member of Parliament for Salisbury; 1654; With: William Stevens	Succeeded by William Stone; James Heeley
Preceded by Not represented in Second Protectorate Parliament	Member of Parliament for Hindon; 1659; With: Edmund Ludlow	Succeeded by Robert Reynolds
