= Salisbury (UK Parliament constituency) =

Parliamentary constituency in the United Kingdom, 1918 onwards

- County constituency for the House of Commons
- Interactive map of boundaries since 2024
- Boundary of Salisbury in South West England
- County: Wiltshire
- Electorate: 70,242 (2023)
- Major settlements: Salisbury

Current constituency
- Created: 1918
- Member of Parliament: John Glen (Conservative)
- Seats: One

1295–1918
- Seats: 1295–1885: Two; 1885–1918: One
- Type of constituency: Borough constituency

Salisbury is a constituency (Note: A county constituency (for the purposes of election expenses and type of returning officer).) in Wiltshire represented in the House of Commons of the UK Parliament since 2010 by John Glen of the Conservative Party. (Note: As with all constituencies, the constituency elects one Member of Parliament (MP) by the first past the post system of election at least every five years.)

== Constituency profile ==
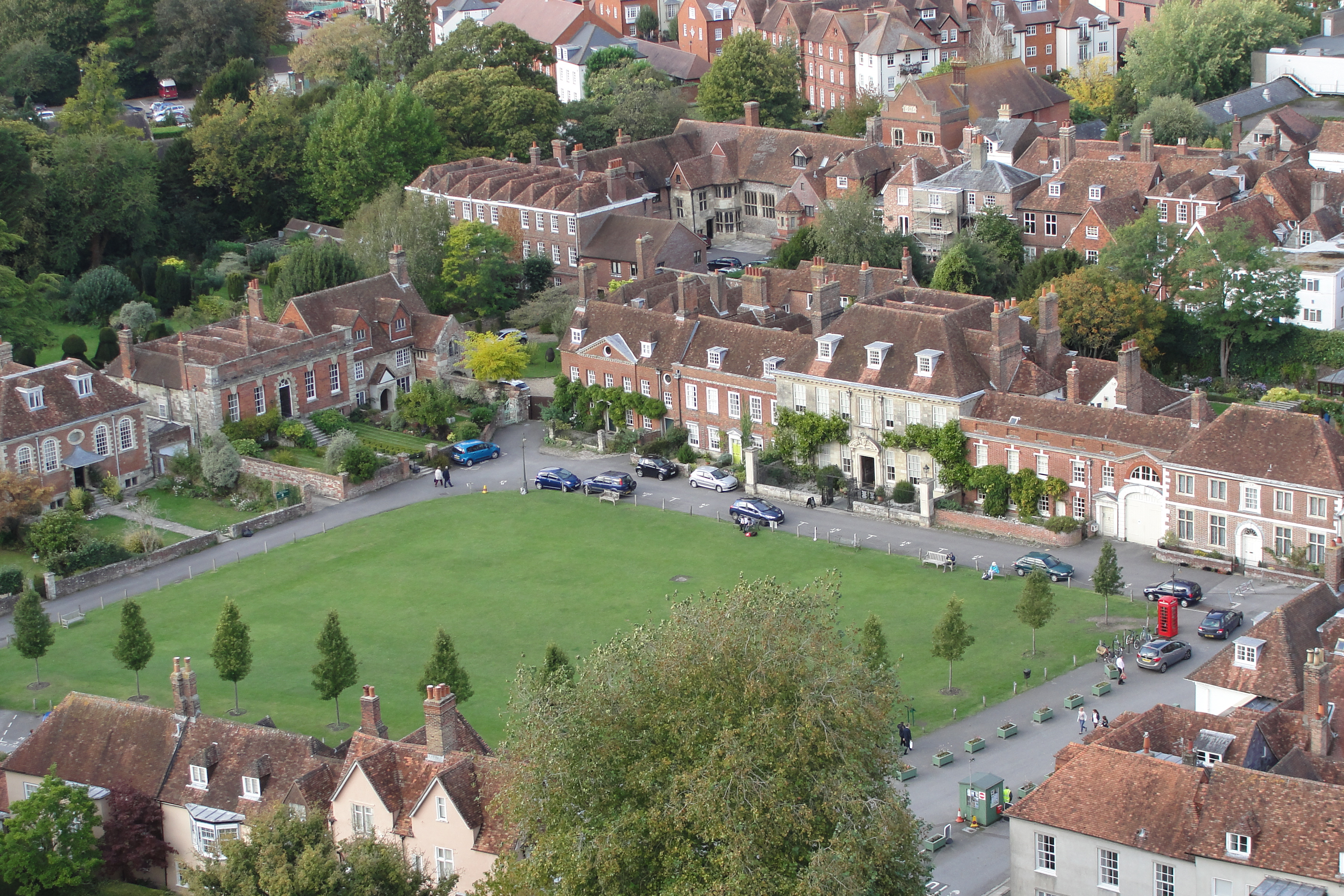
Choristers' Square, Salisbury

Salisbury is a constituency in Wiltshire in South West England, named after its main settlement, the city of Salisbury. The Salisbury built-up area had an estimated population of around 49,000 in 2024. Other settlements include the former county town of Wilton and the villages of Old Sarum, Downton and Tisbury.

Salisbury is a historic city known for its 13th-century cathedral. It is mostly affluent and was a major centre for the production of Supermarine Spitfires during World War II. The constituency is predominantly rural and most of it is within the Cranborne Chase National Landscape, an area of rolling chalk hills. The rural area contains many small villages and hamlets and is also predominantly wealthy, especially to the east of Salisbury. House prices across the constituency are generally higher than regional and national averages.

The Salisbury constituency has a high retired population and a low proportion of young adults. Residents have above-average levels of income and homeownership and the child poverty rate is low. They are generally well-educated and a high proportion work in the health, science and agriculture sectors. The percentage of residents claiming unemployment benefits is low. White people made up 94% of the population at the 2021 census.

At the local council, Salisbury is mostly represented by Liberal Democrats whilst the rural areas outside the city elect Conservatives. An estimated 51% of voters in this constituency supported remaining in the European Union in the 2016 referendum, above the UK-wide figure of 48%.

== History ==
From the Model Parliament of 1295, a constituency with a much narrower area than that of today, the small parliamentary borough of Salisbury, returned two MPs to the House of Commons of England. (Note: And then to its successor bodies: the House of Commons of Great Britain from 1707, and the House of Commons of the United Kingdom from 1801.) Elections were held using the Plurality-at-large voting system, but with no secrecy of the ballot. From 1430, those with the right to vote in the borough elections were the "forty-shilling freeholders", meaning men who owned property rated for Land Tax at more than £2 (equivalent to £1,738 in 2025) a year. The franchise (right to vote) was thus largely restricted to male tradesmen and gentlemen within the historic city. From 1290 to 1832, they could also vote in the elections for two "knights of the shire" to represent the whole county of Wiltshire, if they could get to the polling place at Wilton.

The Salisbury borough constituency co-existed with many others in Wiltshire, including the neighbouring minuscule-electorate seat of Old Sarum, described by the time of its abolition in the Great Reform Act as a rotten borough, which covered the mostly abandoned older settlement on high ground to the north-east.

Under the Redistribution of Seats Act 1885, the borough's representation was reduced to one member. The parliamentary borough of Salisbury was abolished for the 1918 general election, but the name was transferred immediately to a new county division covering most of the southern fifth of Wiltshire.

== Boundaries ==
The constituency is based around the city of Salisbury in Wiltshire. A large portion of the former Salisbury district is included within the constituency. The small town of Downton was a borough constituency until abolished as a rotten borough, like Old Sarum, in 1832.

Map of 2010–2024 boundaries

1918–1950: The Municipal Boroughs of Salisbury and Wilton, and the Rural Districts of Amesbury, Salisbury, Tisbury, and Wilton.

1950–1983: The Municipal Boroughs of Salisbury and Wilton, and the Rural Districts of Amesbury, and Salisbury and Wilton.

1983–2010: The District of Salisbury wards of Alderbury, Amesbury, Bemerton, Bishopdown, Bulford, Chalke Valley, Donhead, Downton, Durrington, Ebble, Fisherton and Bemerton Village, Fonthill, Fovant, Harnham, Idmiston, Laverstock, Milford, Nadder, Redlynch, St Edmund, St Mark, St Martin, St Paul, Stratford, Till Valley, Tisbury, Upper Bourne, Whiteparish, Wilton, Winterbourne, Winterslow, Woodford Valley, and Wylye.

2010–2024: The District of Salisbury wards of Alderbury and Whiteparish, Amesbury East, Amesbury West, Bemerton, Bishopdown, Chalke Valley, Downton and Redlynch, Ebble, Fisherton and Bemerton Village, Harnham East, Harnham West, Laverstock, Lower Wylye and Woodford Valley, St Edmund and Milford, St Francis and Stratford, St Martin and Milford, St Paul, Till Valley and Wylye, Upper Bourne, Idmiston and Winterbourne, Wilton, and Winterslow.

2024–present: Further to the 2023 review of Westminster constituencies which came into effect for the 2024 general election, the constituency is composed of the following (as they existed on 4 May 2021):

- The Wiltshire electoral divisions of: Alderbury & Whiteparish; Downton & Ebble Valley; Fovant & Chalke Valley; Laverstock; Nadder Valley; Old Sarum & Lower Bourne Valley; Redlynch & Landford; Salisbury Bemerton Heath; Salisbury Fisherton & Bemerton Village; Salisbury Harnham East; Salisbury Harnham West; Salisbury Milford; Salisbury St Edmund’s; Salisbury St Francis & Stratford; Salisbury St Paul’s; Tisbury; Wilton; Winterslow & Upper Bourne Valley.

Amesbury and the Till Valley were transferred to the new constituency of East Wiltshire. To partly compensate, Tisbury and the Nadder Valley were transferred from South West Wiltshire.

== Traditions ==
According to a local tradition, the Member of Parliament for Salisbury sings the song The Vly be on the Turmut from the balcony of the White Hart Hotel in St John's Street after winning each Parliamentary election.

== Members of Parliament ==
- Constituency created 1295

=== MPs 1295–1660 ===
Parliament	First member	Second member
1386	Thomas Burford	David White
1388 (Feb)	John Bitterley	Thomas Burford
1388 (Sep)	David White	John Hethe
1390 (Jan)	John Bitterley	William Warmwell
1390 (Nov)		
1391		
1393	John Bitterley	William Warmwell
1394	John Bitterley	Thomas Burford
1395	William Warmwell	Richard Spencer
1397 (Jan)	Richard Spencer	John Moner
1397 (Sep)	Richard Juel	John Cary
1399	William Hulle I	William Walters
1401	Richard Spencer	John Levesham
1402	John Wallop	William Boyton
1404 (Jan)	William Waryn	John Levesham
1404 (Oct)	John Wallop	Richard Juel
1406	William Bailey	William Boyton
1407	Thomas Child	John Becket
1410	William Bourer	William Bailey, died 1410
1411	Richard Spencer	Walter Shirley
1413 (Feb)	Walter Shirley	William Waryn
1413 (May)	Walter Shirley	William Waryn
1414 (Apr)	Walter Shirley	John Becket
1414 (Nov)	Walter Shirley	John Becket
1415	Walter Shirley	Henry Man
1416 (Mar)	Walter Shirley	Henry Man
1416 (Oct)	Walter Shirley	Thomas Mason
1417	Walter Shirley	William Waryn
1419	Walter Shirley	William Waryn
1420	Walter Shirley	Robert Poynaunt
1421 (May)	Walter Shirley	Robert Poynaunt
1421 (Dec)	Walter Shirley	Thomas Boner
1422	Henry Man	
1423	William Alexander	
1425	William Alexander	Henry Man
1426	Henry Man	
1427	William Alexander	
1429	Henry Man	
1431	William Alexander	
1432	William Alexander	
1485	William Boket	Roger Holes
1510	Thomas Coke I	William Webbe alias Kellowe
1512	Thomas Coke I	Richard Bartholomew
1515	Thomas Coke I, repl. Oct 1515 by John Abarough	Richard Bartholomew, repl. Oct 1515 by Thomas Brodegate
1523	Robert Keilway	John Abarough
1529	William Webbe II	Thomas Chaffyn I
1536	William Webbe II	
1539	Robert South	Henry Coldston
1542	Charles Bulkeley	Edward Chaffyn
1545	Thomas Gawdy I	John Story
1547	Sir John Thynne	Henry Clifford
1553 (Mar)	George Penruddock	John Beckingham
1553 (Oct)	John Hooper	John Abyn
1554 (Apr)	Robert Griffith	John Abyn
1554 (Nov)	Robert Griffith	John Hooper
1555	Thomas Chaffyn II	John Hooper
1558	John Hooper	Robert Eyre
1559	William Webbe	John Webbe
1562–3	Anthony Weekes	Giles Estcourt
1571	John Eyre	Giles Estcourt
1572	Giles Estcourt	Hugh Tucker
1584	Giles Estcourt	Christopher Weekes
1586	Giles Estcourt	Christopher Weekes
1588	Christopher Weekes	John Bayley
1593	Giles Hutchens	Robert Bower
1597	Thomas Eyre	Giles Hutchens
1601	Giles Tooker	John Puxton
1604	Giles Tooker	Richard Godfrey
1614	Giles Tooker	Roger Gauntlett
1621	Roger Gauntlett	Thomas Hussey
1624	Henry Sherfield	Roger Gauntlett
1625	Henry Sherfield	Walter Long
1626	Henry Sherfield	John Puxton
1628	Henry Sherfield	Bartholemew Tookey
1629–1640	No Parliaments summoned	
1640 (Apr)	Robert Hyde	Michael Oldisworth
1640 (Nov)	Robert Hyde	Michael Oldisworth
1645	Michael Oldisworth	John Dove
1648	Michael Oldisworth	John Dove
1653	Salisbury not represented in Barebones Parliament	
1654	Edward Tooker	William Stevens
1656	William Stone	James Heeley
1659	Henry Eyre	Humphry Ditton snr

=== MPs 1660–1885 ===
Election	First member	First party	Second member	Second party
1660	Henry Eyre		Edward Tooker	
April 1661	Francis Swanton		Edward Tooker	
November 1661	Stephen Fox		Edward Tooker	
1664	Stephen Fox		Edward Hyde	
1665	Stephen Fox		Richard Colman	
1673	Stephen Fox		William Swanton	
1679	Sir Thomas Mompesson		Alexander Thistlethwayte	
1681	John Wyndham		Alexander Thistlethwayte	
1685	John Wyndham		Sir Stephen Fox	
January 1689	Thomas Hoby	Whig	Giles Eyre	
May 1689	Thomas Hoby	Whig	Thomas Pitt	
1695	Thomas Hoby	Whig	Sir Thomas Mompesson	
1698	Charles Fox		Robert Eyre	
January 1701	Sir Thomas Mompesson		Robert Eyre	
July 1701	Charles Fox		Robert Eyre	
1710	Charles Fox		Robert Pitt	
1713	Charles Fox		Richard Jones	
1714	Sir Stephen Fox		Richard Jones	
1715	Francis Swanton		Edmund Lambert	
1721	Anthony Duncombe		Edmund Lambert	
1722	Anthony Duncombe		Francis Kenton	
1727	Anthony Duncombe		Thomas Lewis	
1734	Peter Bathurst		Henry Hoare	
1741	Sir Jacob Bouverie		Sir Edward Seymour	
1747	Hon. William Bouverie		Edward Poore	
1754	Hon. William Bouverie		Julines Beckford	
1761	Hon. Edward Bouverie		Julines Beckford	
1765	Hon. Edward Bouverie		Samuel Eyre	
1768	Hon. Edward Bouverie		Hon. Stephen Fox	
1771	Viscount Folkestone		Hon. Stephen Fox	
1774	Viscount Folkestone		William Hussey	Whig
1776	Hon. William Henry Bouverie		William Hussey	Whig
1802	Viscount Folkestone	Whig	William Hussey	Whig
1813	Viscount Folkestone	Whig	George Purefoy-Jervoise	Whig
1818	Viscount Folkestone	Whig	Wadham Wyndham	Tory
1828	Hon. Duncombe Pleydell-Bouverie	Whig	Wadham Wyndham	Tory
1832	William Bird Brodie	Whig	Wadham Wyndham	Tory
1833	William Bird Brodie	Whig	Hon. Duncombe Pleydell-Bouverie	Whig
1835	William Bird Brodie	Whig	Wadham Wyndham	Conservative
May 1843 by-election	Ambrose Hussey	Conservative	Wadham Wyndham	Conservative
Nov 1843 by-election	Ambrose Hussey	Conservative	John Campbell	Conservative
Jan. 1847 by-election	William James Chaplin	Whig	John Campbell	Conservative
Jul. 1847	William James Chaplin	Whig	Charles Baring Wall	Peelite
1853 by-election	William James Chaplin	Whig	Edward Pery Buckley	Whig
1857	Matthew Henry Marsh	Whig	Edward Pery Buckley	Whig
1859	Matthew Henry Marsh	Liberal	Edward Pery Buckley	Liberal
1865	Matthew Henry Marsh	Liberal	Edward Hamilton	Liberal
1868	John Alfred Lush	Liberal	Edward Hamilton	Liberal
1869 by-election	John Alfred Lush	Liberal	Alfred Seymour	Liberal
1874	John Alfred Lush	Liberal	Granville Ryder	Conservative
1880	William Grenfell	Liberal	John Passmore Edwards	Liberal
1882 by-election	Coleridge Kennard	Conservative	John Passmore Edwards	Liberal
1885	representation reduced to one member by the Redistribution of Seats Act 1885			

=== MPs since 1885 ===
Election	Member	Party
1885	William Grenfell	Liberal
1886	Edward Hulse	Conservative
1897 by-election	Augustus Allhusen	Conservative
1900	Walter Palmer	Conservative
1906	Edward Tennant	Liberal
Jan. 1910	Godfrey Locker-Lampson	Conservative
1918	Hugh Morrison	Conservative
1923	Hugh Moulton	Liberal
1924	Hugh Morrison	Conservative
1931 by-election	James Despencer-Robertson	Conservative
1942 by-election	John Morrison	Conservative
1965 by-election	Michael Hamilton	Conservative
1983	Robert Key	Conservative
2010	John Glen	Conservative

== Elections ==
=== Elections in the 2020s ===
General election 2024: Salisbury
Party	Candidate	Votes	%	±%
Conservative	John Glen	17,110	34.1	−21.1
Labour	Matt Aldridge	13,303	26.5	+7.8
Liberal Democrats	Victoria Charleston	11,825	23.6	+4.1
Reform	Julian Malins	5,235	10.4	N/A
Green	Barney Norris	2,115	4.2	−0.9
Independent	Arthur Pendragon	458	0.9	−0.5
Climate	Chris Harwood	127	0.3	N/A
Majority		3,807	7.6	−29.1
Turnout		50,173	71.4	−3.7
Registered electors		70,281		
Conservative hold		Swing	−14.5	

=== Elections in the 2010s ===
2019 notional result
Party	Vote	%
Conservative	29,138	55.2
Liberal Democrats	10,290	19.5
Labour	9,884	18.7
Green	2,685	5.1
Others	745	1.4
Turnout	52,742	75.1
Electorate	70,242	

General election 2019: Salisbury
Party	Candidate	Votes	%	±%
Conservative	John Glen	30,280	56.4	−1.7
Liberal Democrats	Victoria Charleston	10,544	19.6	+8.4
Labour	Tom Corbin	9,675	18.0	−7.5
Green	Rick Page	2,486	4.6	+2.4
Independent	King Arthur Pendragon	745	1.4	+0.6
Majority		19,736	36.7	+4.2
Turnout		53,730	72.1	−2.0
Conservative hold		Swing		

General election 2017: Salisbury
Party	Candidate	Votes	%	±%
Conservative	John Glen	30,952	58.1	+2.5
Labour	Tom Corbin	13,619	25.5	+10.2
Liberal Democrats	Paul Sample	5,982	11.2	+1.1
UKIP	Dean Palethorpe	1,191	2.2	−9.9
Green	Brig Oubridge	1,152	2.2	−3.2
Independent	Arthur Uther Pendragon	415	0.8	−0.6
Majority		17,333	32.6	−7.7
Turnout		53,311	74.1	+1.2
Conservative hold		Swing	−3.85	

General election 2015: Salisbury
Party	Candidate	Votes	%	±%
Conservative	John Glen	28,192	55.6	+6.4
Labour	Tom Corbin	7,771	15.3	+7.7
UKIP	Paul Martin	6,152	12.1	+9.2
Liberal Democrats	Reetendra Banerji	5,099	10.1	−26.8
Green	Alison Craig	2,762	5.4	+4.4
Independent	Arthur Uther Pendragon	729	1.4	+0.9
Majority		20,421	40.3	+28.0
Turnout		50,705	72.9	+1.0
Conservative hold		Swing		

General election 2010: Salisbury
Party	Candidate	Votes	%	±%
Conservative	John Glen	23,859	49.2	+2.8
Liberal Democrats	Nick Radford	17,893	36.9	+10.0
Labour	Tom Gann	3,690	7.6	−11.0
UKIP	Frances Howard	1,392	2.9	−1.3
BNP	Sean Witheridge	765	1.6	N/A
Green	Nick Startin	506	1.0	−2.4
Independent	Arthur Uther Pendragon	257	0.5	N/A
Independent	John Holme	119	0.2	N/A
Majority		5,966	12.3	−8.2
Turnout		48,481	71.9	+3.4
Conservative hold		Swing	−3.6	

=== Elections in the 2000s ===
General election 2005: Salisbury
Party	Candidate	Votes	%	±%
Conservative	Robert Key	25,961	47.8	+1.2
Liberal Democrats	Richard Denton-White	14,819	27.3	−2.8
Labour	Clare Moody	9,457	17.4	−0.1
UKIP	Frances Howard	2,290	4.2	+0.5
Green	Hamish Soutar	1,555	2.9	+0.8
Independent	John Holme	240	0.4	N/A
Majority		11,142	20.5	+4.0
Turnout		54,322	68.1	+2.8
Conservative hold		Swing	+2.0	

General election 2001: Salisbury
Party	Candidate	Votes	%	±%
Conservative	Robert Key	24,527	46.6	+3.6
Liberal Democrats	Yvonne Emmerson-Peirce	15,824	30.1	−2.1
Labour	Sue Mallory	9,199	17.5	−0.1
UKIP	Malcolm Wood	1,958	3.7	−2.0
Green	Hamish Soutar	1,095	2.1	+1.0
Majority		8,703	16.5	+5.7
Turnout		52,603	65.3	−8.3
Conservative hold		Swing		

=== Elections in the 1990s ===
General election 1997: Salisbury
Party	Candidate	Votes	%	±%
Conservative	Robert Key	25,012	43.0	−9.0
Liberal Democrats	Yvonne Emmerson-Peirce	18,736	32.2	−5.0
Labour	Ricky Rogers	10,242	17.6	+8.6
UKIP	Nigel Farage	3,332	5.7	N/A
Green	Hamish Soutar	623	1.1	+0.1
Independent	William Holmes	184	0.3	N/A
Natural Law	Shirley Haysom	110	0.2	0.0
Majority		6,276	10.8	−4.0
Turnout		58,239	73.6	−6.3
Conservative hold		Swing	−2.0	

General election 1992: Salisbury
Party	Candidate	Votes	%	±%
Conservative	Robert Key	31,546	52.0	−2.9
Liberal Democrats	Paul W.L. Sample	22,573	37.2	+2.2
Labour	Steve R. Fear	5,483	9.0	−0.5
Green	Sherwood M. Elcock	609	1.0	N/A
Independent	Steven W. Fletcher	233	0.4	N/A
Independent	Tim I. Abbott	117	0.2	N/A
Natural Law	Annie Martell	93	0.2	N/A
Majority		8,973	14.8	−5.1
Turnout		60,654	79.9	+4.3
Conservative hold		Swing	−2.5	

=== Elections in the 1980s ===
General election 1987: Salisbury
Party	Candidate	Votes	%	±%
Conservative	Robert Key	31,612	54.9	+1.4
SDP	Parry Mitchell	20,169	35.0	−5.2
Labour	Teresa Seaborne	5,455	9.5	+3.7
Independent	Steven W. Fletcher	372	0.6	N/A
Majority		11,443	19.9	+6.6
Turnout		57,608	75.6	+2.8
Conservative hold		Swing		

General election 1983: Salisbury
Party	Candidate	Votes	%	±%
Conservative	Robert Key	28,876	53.5	
Liberal	John F Lakeman	21,702	40.2	
Labour	Celia Lamberth	3,139	5.8	
Wessex Regionalists	M Kemp	182	0.3	
Independent	T Abbott	86	0.2	
Majority		7,174	13.3	
Turnout		53,899	72.8	
Conservative hold		Swing		

=== Elections in the 1970s ===
General election 1979: Salisbury
Party	Candidate	Votes	%	±%
Conservative	Michael Hamilton	24,962	49.9	+6.3
Liberal	John F Lakeman	18,718	37.4	+2.7
Labour	CR Boney	6,321	12.6	−9.0
Majority		6,244	12.5	+3.6
Turnout		50,001	77.4	+2.7
Conservative hold		Swing		

General election October 1974: Salisbury
Party	Candidate	Votes	%	±%
Conservative	Michael Hamilton	20,478	43.6	−2.1
Liberal	John F Lakeman	16,298	34.7	+1.5
Labour	CJ Connor	10,140	21.6	+0.6
Majority		4,180	8.9	−3.6
Turnout		46,916	74.7	−5.2
Conservative hold		Swing		

General election February 1974: Salisbury
Party	Candidate	Votes	%	±%
Conservative	Michael Hamilton	22,753	45.7	−14.6
Liberal	John F Lakeman	16,536	33.2	N/A
Labour	CJ Connor	10,455	21.0	−18.7
Majority		6,217	12.5	−8.1
Turnout		49,744	79.95	+8.5
Conservative hold		Swing		

General election 1970: Salisbury
Party	Candidate	Votes	%	±%
Conservative	Michael Hamilton	26,549	60.3	+5.3
Labour	Alexander Waugh	17,493	39.7	−5.3
Majority		9,056	20.6	+10.6
Turnout		44,042	71.4	−4.8
Conservative hold		Swing		

=== Elections in the 1960s ===
General election 1966: Salisbury
Party	Candidate	Votes	%	±%
Conservative	Michael Hamilton	22,601	55.0	+6.7
Labour	Ronald C Smith	18,462	45.0	+10.6
Majority		4,139	10.0	−3.9
Turnout		41,063	76.2	−2.4
Conservative hold		Swing	+1.9	

Salisbury by-election, February 1965
Party	Candidate	Votes	%	±%
Conservative	Michael Hamilton	17,599	48.2	−0.1
Labour	Leif Mills	13,660	37.4	+3.0
Liberal	Hugh Capstick	4,699	12.9	−4.4
Ind. Conservative	Horace Trevor-Cox	533	1.5	N/A
Majority		3,939	10.8	−3.1
Turnout		36,491		
Conservative hold		Swing		

General election 1964: Salisbury
Party	Candidate	Votes	%	±%
Conservative	John Morrison	20,071	48.3	−4.5
Labour	Leif Mills	14,311	34.4	+1.3
Liberal	Hugh Capstick	7,176	17.3	+3.2
Majority		5,760	13.9	−5.8
Turnout		41,558	78.6	+0.4
Conservative hold		Swing		

=== Elections in the 1950s ===
General election 1959: Salisbury
Party	Candidate	Votes	%	±%
Conservative	John Morrison	20,641	52.8	−0.6
Labour	John A Cannon	12,932	33.1	−0.2
Liberal	John Mackarness Booker	5,516	14.1	+0.8
Majority		7,709	19.7	−0.4
Turnout		39,089	78.2	+0.5
Conservative hold		Swing		

General election 1955: Salisbury
Party	Candidate	Votes	%	±%
Conservative	John Morrison	20,271	53.4	−3.7
Labour	John Papworth	12,632	33.3	−9.6
Liberal	John Mackarness Booker	5,037	13.3	N/A
Majority		7,639	20.1	+5.9
Turnout		37,940	77.7	−2.5
Conservative hold		Swing		

General election 1951: Salisbury
Party	Candidate	Votes	%	±%
Conservative	John Morrison	21,798	57.1	+12.1
Labour	Roger R Thomas	16,386	42.9	+10.9
Majority		5,412	14.2	+1.2
Turnout		38,184	80.2	−3.5
Conservative hold		Swing		

General election 1950: Salisbury
Party	Candidate	Votes	%	±%
Conservative	John Morrison	17,301	45.0	
Labour	WAJ Case	12,319	32.0	
Liberal	Alan Campbell-Johnson	8,847	23.0	
Majority		4,982	13.0	
Turnout		38,467	83.7	
Conservative hold		Swing		

=== Elections in the 1940s ===
General election 1945: Salisbury
Party	Candidate	Votes	%	±%
Conservative	John Morrison	16,742	44.02	
Labour	John Alan Lyde Caunter	12,344	32.46	
Liberal	Alan Campbell-Johnson	8,946	23.52	N/A
Majority		4,398	11.56	
Turnout		38,032	70.81	
Conservative hold		Swing		

Salisbury by-election, July 1942
Party	Candidate	Votes	%	±%
Conservative	John Morrison	12,076	67.8	−3.7
Independent Progressive	Reg Hipwell	3,218	18.1	N/A
Independent Democrat	J. D. Monro	2,519	14.1	N/A
Majority		8,858	49.7	+6.7
Turnout		17,813	39.7	−26.5
Conservative hold		Swing		

=== Elections in the 1930s ===
General election 1935: Salisbury
Party	Candidate	Votes	%	±%
Conservative	James Despencer-Robertson	20,707	71.5	−5.4
Labour	E. J. Plaisted	8,259	28.5	+5.4
Majority		12,448	43.0	−10.8
Turnout		28,966	66.2	−5.7
Conservative hold		Swing	−5.4	

General election 1931: Salisbury
Party	Candidate	Votes	%	±%
Conservative	James Despencer-Robertson	23,189	76.92	
Labour	AB Lemon	6,956	23.08	
Majority		16,233	53.84	
Turnout		30,145	71.86	
Conservative hold		Swing		

Salisbury by-election, March 1931: Salisbury
Party	Candidate	Votes	%	±%
Conservative	James Despencer-Robertson	15,800	53.9	+6.6
Liberal	Lucy Masterman	9,588	32.7	−6.6
Labour	F. R. Hancock	3,939	13.4	0.0
Majority		6,212	21.2	+13.2
Turnout		29,327	71.1	−10.8
Conservative hold		Swing	+6.6	

=== Elections in the 1920s ===
General election 1929: Salisbury
Party	Candidate	Votes	%	±%
Unionist	Hugh Morrison	15,672	47.3	−9.0
Liberal	Lucy Masterman	13,022	39.3	+3.7
Labour	F. R. Hancock	4,435	13.4	+5.3
Majority		2,650	8.0	−12.7
Turnout		33,129	81.9	+0.1
Registered electors		40,453		
Unionist hold		Swing	−6.4	

General election 1924: Salisbury
Party	Candidate	Votes	%	±%
Unionist	Hugh Morrison	14,475	56.3	+7.7
Liberal	Hugh Moulton	9,138	35.6	−15.8
Labour	David Freeman	2,071	8.1	N/A
Majority		5,337	20.7	N/A
Turnout		25,684	81.8	+1.6
Registered electors		31,393		
Unionist gain from Liberal		Swing	+11.8	

General election 1923: Salisbury
Party	Candidate	Votes	%	±%
Liberal	Hugh Moulton	12,375	51.4	+2.1
Unionist	Hugh Morrison	11,710	48.6	−2.1
Majority		665	2.8	N/A
Turnout		24,085	80.2	−0.9
Registered electors		30,026		
Liberal gain from Unionist		Swing	+2.1	

General election 1922: Salisbury
Party	Candidate	Votes	%	±%
Unionist	Hugh Morrison	11,882	50.7	−2.6
Liberal	Ernest Brown	11,559	49.3	+2.6
Majority		323	1.4	−5.2
Turnout		23,441	81.1	+22.1
Registered electors		28,911		
Unionist hold		Swing	−2.6	

=== Elections in the 1910s ===
General election 1918: Salisbury
Party		Candidate	Votes	%	±%
C	Unionist	Hugh Morrison	9,168	53.3	−2.0
	Liberal	Ernest Brown	8,018	46.7	+2.0
Majority			1,150	6.6	−4.0
Turnout			17,186	59.0	−34.4
Registered electors			29,144		
	Unionist hold		Swing	−2.0	
C indicates candidate endorsed by the coalition government.

General election December 1910: Salisbury
Party	Candidate	Votes	%	±%
Conservative	Godfrey Locker-Lampson	1,750	55.3	+0.5
Liberal	C.J. Warner	1,413	44.7	−0.5
Majority		337	10.6	+1.0
Turnout		3,163	93.4	−3.7
Registered electors		3,386		
Conservative hold		Swing	+0.5	

General election January 1910: Salisbury
Party	Candidate	Votes	%	±%
Conservative	Godfrey Locker-Lampson	1,803	54.8	+5.4
Liberal	Edward Tennant	1,485	45.2	−5.4
Majority		318	9.6	N/A
Turnout		3,288	97.1	+1.4
Registered electors		3,386		
Conservative gain from Liberal		Swing	+5.4	

=== Elections in the 1900s ===
General election 1906: Salisbury
Party	Candidate	Votes	%	±%
Liberal	Edward Tennant	1,646	50.6	+5.3
Conservative	Walter Palmer	1,605	49.4	−5.3
Majority		41	1.2	N/A
Turnout		3,251	95.7	+6.6
Registered electors		3,396		
Liberal gain from Conservative		Swing	+5.3	

General election 1900: Salisbury
Party	Candidate	Votes	%	±%
Conservative	Walter Palmer	1,399	54.7	+0.5
Liberal	Frederick Low	1,160	45.3	−0.5
Majority		239	9.4	+1.0
Turnout		2,559	89.1	−3.5
Registered electors		2,872		
Conservative hold		Swing	+0.5	

=== Elections in the 1890s ===
By-election, 27 Jan 1897: Salisbury
Party	Candidate	Votes	%	±%
Conservative	Augustus Allhusen	1,425	52.7	−1.5
Liberal	John Fuller	1,278	47.3	+1.5
Majority		147	5.4	−3.0
Turnout		2,703	94.2	+1.6
Registered electors		2,868		
Conservative hold		Swing	−1.5	

- Caused by Hulse's resignation.

General election 1895: Salisbury
Party	Candidate	Votes	%	±%
Conservative	Edward Hulse	1,404	54.2	−0.5
Liberal	Sir William Brown, 2nd Baronet	1,187	45.8	+0.5
Majority		217	8.4	−1.0
Turnout		2,591	92.6	−0.1
Registered electors		2,799		
Conservative hold		Swing	−0.5	

General election 1892: Salisbury
Party	Candidate	Votes	%	±%
Conservative	Edward Hulse	1,374	54.7	−3.3
Liberal	Sir William Brown, 2nd Baronet	1,136	45.3	+3.3
Majority		238	9.4	−6.6
Turnout		2,510	92.7	−0.2
Registered electors		2,709		
Conservative hold		Swing	−3.3	

=== Elections in the 1880s ===
General election 1886: Salisbury
Party	Candidate	Votes	%	±%
Conservative	Edward Hulse	1,259	58.0	+8.9
Liberal	William Grenfell	910	42.0	−8.9
Majority		349	16.0	N/A
Turnout		2,169	92.9	−3.3
Registered electors		2,336		
Conservative gain from Liberal		Swing	+8.9	

General election 1885: Salisbury
Party	Candidate	Votes	%	±%
Liberal	William Grenfell	1,144	50.9	−2.6
Conservative	Coleridge Kennard	1,104	49.1	+2.6
Majority		40	1.8	−1.5
Turnout		2,248	96.2	+5.1 (est)
Registered electors		2,336		
Liberal hold		Swing	−2.6	

By-election, 21 Nov 1882: Salisbury (1 seat)
Party	Candidate	Votes	%	±%
Conservative	Coleridge Kennard	955	52.9	+6.4
Liberal	William Grenfell	852	47.1	−6.4
Majority		103	5.8	N/A
Turnout		1,807	87.7	−3.4 (est)
Registered electors		2,061		
Conservative gain from Liberal		Swing	+6.4	

- Caused by Grenfell's appointment as a Groom in Waiting to Queen Victoria.

General election 1880: Salisbury (2 seats)
Party	Candidate	Votes	%	±%
Liberal	William Grenfell	961	26.8	+1.6
Liberal	John Passmore Edwards	958	26.7	+2.8
Conservative	Coleridge Kennard	841	23.4	−2.9
Conservative	Ralph Dutton	828	23.1	−1.5
Majority		117	3.3	+2.7
Turnout		1,794 (est)	91.1 (est)	+4.2
Registered electors		1,969		
Liberal hold		Swing	+1.7	
Liberal gain from Conservative		Swing	+2.9	

=== Elections in the 1870s ===
General election 1874: Salisbury (2 seats)
Party	Candidate	Votes	%	±%
Conservative	Granville Ryder	835	26.3	+11.1
Liberal	John Alfred Lush	800	25.2	−11.3
Conservative	Adam Steinmetz Kennard	783	24.6	+9.4
Liberal	Alfred Seymour	759	23.9	−9.2
Turnout		1,589 (est)	86.9 (est)	−4.6
Registered electors		1,829		
Majority		76	2.4	N/A
Conservative gain from Liberal		Swing	+10.7	
Majority		17	0.6	−2.1
Liberal hold		Swing	−10.8	

=== Elections in the 1860s ===
By-election, 5 August 1869: Salisbury (1 seat)
Party	Candidate	Votes	%	±%
Liberal	Alfred Seymour	562	47.1	−22.5
Conservative	Granville Ryder	549	46.0	+15.6
Adullamite	Matthew Henry Marsh	82	6.9	N/A
Majority		13	1.1	−1.6
Turnout		1,193	81.7	−9.8
Registered electors		1,461		
Liberal hold		Swing	−19.1	

- Caused by Hamilton's resignation.

General election 1868: Salisbury (2 seats)
Party	Candidate	Votes	%	±%
Liberal	John Alfred Lush	748	36.5	−2.9
Liberal	Edward Hamilton	679	33.1	−0.4
Conservative	Granville Ryder	623	30.4	+3.3
Majority		56	2.7	−3.7
Turnout		1,337 (est)	91.5 (est)	+5.9
Registered electors		1,461		
Liberal hold		Swing	−2.3	
Liberal hold		Swing	−1.0	

General election 1865: Salisbury (2 seats)
Party	Candidate	Votes	%	±%
Liberal	Matthew Henry Marsh	367	39.4	+5.4
Liberal	Edward Hamilton	312	33.5	−5.1
Conservative	John Chapman	252	27.1	−0.2
Majority		60	6.4	−0.3
Turnout		592 (est)	85.6 (est)	−3.2
Registered electors		691		
Liberal hold		Swing	+2.8	
Liberal hold		Swing	−2.5	

=== Elections in the 1850s ===
General election 1859: Salisbury (2 seats)
Party	Candidate	Votes	%	±%
Liberal	Edward Pery Buckley	370	38.6	N/A
Liberal	Matthew Henry Marsh	326	34.0	N/A
Conservative	John Chapman	262	27.3	N/A
Majority		64	6.7	N/A
Turnout		610 (est)	88.8 (est)	N/A
Registered electors		687		
Liberal hold		Swing	N/A	
Liberal hold		Swing	N/A	

General election 1857: Salisbury (2 seats)
Party	Candidate	Votes	%	±%
Whig	Edward Pery Buckley	Unopposed		
Whig	Matthew Henry Marsh	Unopposed		
Registered electors		680		
Whig hold				
Whig gain from Peelite				

By-election, 15 November 1853: Salisbury (1 seat)
Party	Candidate	Votes	%	±%
Whig	Edward Pery Buckley	255	74.3	+36.8
Conservative	Julius Roberts	88	25.7	−4.2
Majority		167	48.6	N/A
Turnout		343	50.4	−24.3
Registered electors		680		
Whig gain from Peelite		Swing	+20.5	

- Caused by Wall's death

General election 1852: Salisbury (2 seats)
Party	Candidate	Votes	%	±%
Whig	William Chaplin	381	37.5	−9.9
Peelite	Charles Baring Wall	331	32.6	−3.6
Conservative	Frederick William Slade	173	17.0	+8.8
Conservative	Daniel Higford Davall Burr	131	12.9	+4.7
Turnout		508 (est)	74.7 (est)	+1.7
Registered electors		680		
Majority		50	4.9	−6.3
Whig hold		Swing	−8.3	
Majority		158	15.6	−4.2
Peelite hold		Swing	−5.2	

=== Elections in the 1840s ===
General election 1847: Salisbury (2 seats)
Party	Candidate	Votes	%	±%
Whig	William Chaplin	490	47.4	+14.6
Peelite	Charles Baring Wall	374	36.2	−4.8
Conservative	John Smith	170	16.4	−9.8
Turnout		517 (est)	73.0 (est)	−15.7
Registered electors		708		
Majority		116	11.2	+5.6
Whig hold		Swing	+9.8	
Majority		204	19.8	N/A
Peelite gain from Conservative		Swing	+0.1	

By-election, 25 January 1847: Salisbury
Party	Candidate	Votes	%	±%
Whig	William Chaplin	Unopposed		
Whig gain from Conservative				

- Caused by Hussey's resignation by accepting the office of Steward of the Chiltern Hundreds

By-election, 24 November 1843: Salisbury
Party	Candidate	Votes	%	±%
Conservative	John Campbell	317	54.0	−13.2
Whig	Edward Pleydell-Bouverie	270	46.0	+13.2
Majority		47	8.0	−0.2
Turnout		587	81.1	−7.6
Registered electors		724		
Conservative hold		Swing	−13.2	

- Caused by Wyndham's death.

By-election, 4 May 1843: Salisbury
Party	Candidate	Votes	%	±%
Conservative	Ambrose Hussey	252	57.3	−9.9
Whig	Edward Pleydell-Bouverie	188	42.7	+9.9
Majority		64	14.6	N/A
Turnout		440	60.8	−27.9
Registered electors		724		
Conservative gain from Whig		Swing	−9.9	

- Caused by Brodie's resignation by accepting the office of Steward of the Chiltern Hundreds. Bouverie retired during polling.

General election 1841: Salisbury (2 seats)
Party	Candidate	Votes	%	±%
Conservative	Wadham Wyndham	366	41.0	N/A
Whig	William Bird Brodie	293	32.8	N/A
Conservative	Anthony John Ashley	234	26.2	N/A
Turnout		544	88.7	N/A
Registered electors		613		
Majority		73	8.2	N/A
Conservative hold		Swing	N/A	
Majority		59	6.6	N/A
Whig hold		Swing	N/A	

=== Elections in the 1830s ===
General election 1837: Salisbury (2 seats)
Party	Candidate	Votes	%
Conservative	Wadham Wyndham	Unopposed	
Whig	William Bird Brodie	Unopposed	
Registered electors		707	
Conservative hold			
Whig hold			

General election 1835: Salisbury (2 seats)
Party	Candidate	Votes	%
Conservative	Wadham Wyndham	Unopposed	
Whig	William Bird Brodie	Unopposed	
Registered electors		650	
Conservative hold			
Whig hold			

General election 1832: Salisbury (2 seats)
Party	Candidate	Votes	%	±%
Whig	William Bird Brodie	392	42.4	+31.6
Tory	Wadham Wyndham	268	29.0	−12.5
Whig	Duncombe Pleydell-Bouverie	265	28.6	−19.1
Turnout		531	92.2	c. +16.3
Registered electors		576		
Majority		124	13.4	+7.2
Whig hold		Swing	+19.0	
Majority		3	0.4	−30.3
Tory hold		Swing	−12.5	

- On petition, Wyndham was unseated in favour of Pleydell-Bouverie

General election 1831: Salisbury (2 seats)
Party	Candidate	Votes	%
Whig	Duncombe Pleydell-Bouverie	31	47.7
Tory	Wadham Wyndham	27	41.5
Whig	William Bird Brodie	7	10.8
Turnout		41	c. 75.9
Registered electors		c. 54	
Majority		4	6.2
Whig hold			
Majority		20	30.7
Tory hold			

General election 1830: Salisbury (2 seats)
Party	Candidate	Votes	%
Whig	Duncombe Pleydell-Bouverie	Unopposed	
Tory	Wadham Wyndham	Unopposed	
Whig hold			
Tory hold			

== See also ==
- Parliamentary constituencies in Wiltshire

== Sources ==
- Craig, F. W. S. (1989) [1977]. British parliamentary election results 1832–1885 (2nd ed.). Chichester: Parliamentary Research Services. pp. 266–267. ISBN 0-900178-26-4.
- Craig, F. W. S. (1989) [1974]. British parliamentary election results 1885–1918 (2nd ed.). Chichester: Parliamentary Research Services. p. 181. ISBN 0-900178-27-2.
- Craig, F. W. S. (1983) [1969]. British parliamentary election results 1918–1949 (3rd ed.). Chichester: Parliamentary Research Services. p. 497. ISBN 0-900178-06-X.
