= William Waryn =

Member of the Parliament of England

William Waryn was the member of the Parliament of England for Salisbury for multiple parliaments from January 1404 to 1419. He was also mayor of Salisbury.
