= Robert Poynaunt =

Member of the Parliament of England

Robert Poynaunt (fl. early 1400s) was the member of the Parliament of England for Salisbury for the parliaments of 1420 and May 1421. He was also mayor of Salisbury.
