= John Moner =

Member of the Parliament of England

John Moner was the member of the Parliament of England for Salisbury for the parliament of January 1397. He was also mayor of Salisbury.
