= Richard Godfrey (died 1631) =

English politician

Richard Godfrey (by 1559 – 1631), of Salisbury, Wiltshire, was an English politician.

He was a member (MP) of the parliament of England for Salisbury in 1604.
