= Robert South (MP) =

16th-century English politician

Robert South (by 1494 – will proved on 11 May 1540), of Salisbury, was an English politician.

South was Mayor of Salisbury in 1528. He was a member (MP) of the parliament of England for Salisbury in 1536 and 1539.
