= Thomas Child (MP) =

Member of the Parliament of England

Thomas Child (died 1413) was a mercer and the member of the Parliament of England for Salisbury for the parliament of 1407. He was also reeve and constable of Salisbury.
