= John Webbe (died 1571) =

English politician

John Webbe (c. 1532 – 1571) was an English politician.

Webbe was Mayor of Salisbury from 1560 to 1561. He was a member (MP) of the parliament of England for Salisbury in 1559.
