= Granville Ryder (1833–1901) =

British Conservative Party politician

Granville Richard Ryder (22 September 1833 – 3 August 1901) was a British Conservative Party politician.

Ryder was the second son of the Hon. Granville Ryder, second son of Dudley Ryder, 1st Earl of Harrowby. His mother was Lady Georgiana Augusta, daughter of Henry Somerset, 6th Duke of Beaufort. He was educated at Christ Church, Oxford, where he matriculated in 1851. He was elected at the 1874 general election as Member of Parliament (MP) for Salisbury, having unsuccessfully contested the seat at a by-election in 1869. He retired from the House of Commons at the 1880 general election.

Ryder married Sibylla Sophia, daughter of Sir Robert Grant, in 1864. They had no children. In 1895, he bought Fisherton Delamere House from Laurence Birch. He died in August 1901, aged 67. His wife survived him by only two months and died in October 1901.

Parliament of the United Kingdom
Preceded by John Alfred Lush; Alfred Seymour	Member of Parliament for Salisbury; 1874 – 1880; With: John Alfred Lush	Succeeded by William Grenfell; John Passmore Edwards
