= Richard Spencer (died 1414) =

Member of the Parliament of England

Richard Spencer (died 1414) was the member of the Parliament of England for Salisbury for multiple parliaments from 1395 to 1411. He was also coroner and mayor of Salisbury.
