= Thomas Mompesson =

English politician

Thomas Mompesson (1630–1701), of Mompesson House, The Close, Salisbury and St Martin's Lane, Westminster, was an English politician. He entered Lincoln's Inn in 1648, and was called to the bar in 1654.

He was a Member (MP) of the Parliament of England for Wilton in 1661, for Salisbury in March 1679, October 1679, 1695 and the period 6 January – 11 June 1701, for Old Sarum in 1681, 1685 and 1690, and for Wiltshire in 1689.

As a Whig and a former Colonel in the Wiltshire Militia, as well as a member of the Honourable Artillery Company of London, he was re-appointed to command the Red Regiment of Wiltshire Militia after the Glorious Revolution.

He was buried in Salisbury Cathedral.
