= Edward Chaffyn =

16th-century English politician

Edward Chaffyn (fl. 1542) was an English politician.

Chaffyn's life remains obscure. He was a member (MP) of the parliament of England for Salisbury in 1542.
