= David Frank White =

American politician

D. Frank White
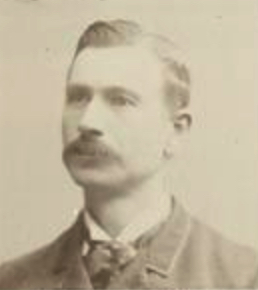

Member of the Virginia House of Delegates from Accomac County
- In office December 2, 1891 – December 6, 1893

Personal details
- Born: David Frank White; May 8, 1850
- Died: December 31, 1897 (aged 47)
- Party: Democratic
- Spouse: Medora Sara Melson

David Frank White (May 8, 1850 – December 31, 1897) was an American politician who served in the Virginia House of Delegates.
