= Giles Hutchens =

English politician

Giles Hutchens (before 1556 – 21 February 1624) was an English politician.

== Biography ==
Hutchens was mayor of Salisbury in 1592–1593. He was a member (MP) of the parliament of England for Salisbury in 1593 and 1597.
