= William Webb (cricketer, born 1898) =

English cricketer and civil servant

Personal information
- Full name: William Louis Taggart Webb
- Born: 6 February 1898; Camberwell, Surrey, England
- Died: 3 April 1969 (aged 71); Southport, Lancashire, England
- Batting: Right-handed

Career statistics
Competition	First-class
Matches	1
Runs scored	76
Batting average	38.00
100s/50s	0/1
Top score	59
Catches/stumpings	0/–
- Source: Cricinfo, 17 February 2019

William Louis Taggart Webb (6 February 1898 – 3 April 1969) was an English first-class cricketer and civil servant.

Webb was born at Camberwell. He first joined the Civil Service in August 1922 as a clerk in the Inland Revenue. He represented the Civil Service cricket team in its only appearance in first-class cricket against the touring New Zealanders at Chiswick in 1927. Batting twice during the match, he scored 59 runs in the Civil Service first-innings before being dismissed by Matt Henderson, while in their second-innings he was dismissed for 17 runs by Roger Blunt.

He later transferred to the Ministry of Labour in November 1929. He died at Southport in April 1969.
