= John Hethe =

Member of the Parliament of England

John Hethe was the member of the Parliament of England for Salisbury for the parliament of September 1388. He was also reeve and mayor of Salisbury.
