= David White (steamboat) =

Mississippi River steamboat, exploded 1867

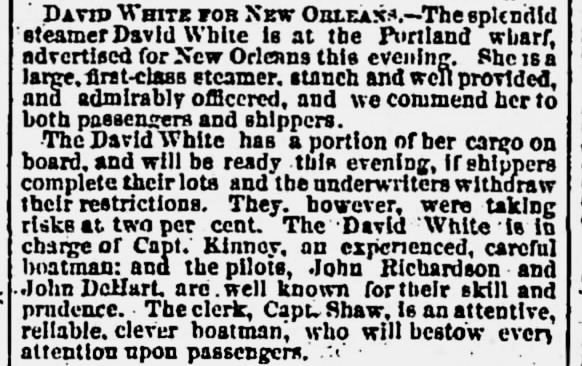
Louisville Daily Courier, January 28, 1867

David White was a Mississippi River steamboat that exploded her boilers opposite Point Chicot near Columbia, Arkansas (below Helena) on February 17, 1867. There were an estimated 50 to 65 fatalities. David White was racing Mollie Able at the time of the explosion.

David White was owned by H.G. Shaw, Charles Davis, and John Davis, who had been associated with the Coleman Scouts Confederate spy ring during the American Civil War; Shaw and John Davis were among those killed.

She may have been named for a prominent resident of Madison, Indiana, or a past owner based in St. Louis. David White was originally built as the John Raine. The John Raine was built in 1858 at New Albany, Indiana at the shipyard of Jacob Dowerman and Thomas Humphreys. Originally used for trade between Louisville and Wheeling, John Raine was later operated by the Lightning Line, running from Louisville to New Orleans. During the American Civil War she served in the Mississippi Marine Brigade and was worth about $45,000. After the war, John Raine was sold back into civilian use and was then renamed David White. This has led to confusion with a separate vessel known as David White, which was built in Madison, Indiana in 1853.

== See also ==
- List of boiler explosions
- Steamboats of the Mississippi
