= John Beckingham =

16th-century English politician

John Beckingham (by 1510 – 1566) was an English politician.

He was a member (MP) of the parliament of England for Salisbury in March 1553.
