= Thomas Chaffyn I =

16th-century English politician

Thomas Chaffyn (by 1498–1558), was an English politician.

He was a member (MP) of the parliament of England for Salisbury in 1529.

His son, Thomas Chaffyn, was also an MP for Salisbury and Heytesbury.
