= John Wallop (died 1405) =

Member of the Parliament of England

Parliament of England

Personal details
- Died: 1405
- Occupation: politician

John Wallop (died 1405) was a draper and the member of the Parliament of England for Salisbury for the parliaments of 1402 and October 1404. He was also mayor of Salisbury.
