= Bartholomew Tookie =

Bartholomew Tookie (c. 1568 – 1635), of Salisbury, Wiltshire, was a Member of Parliament for Salisbury in 1621 and Mayor of Salisbury in 1610.
