= David White (MP) =

Member of the Parliament of England

David White (fl. late 14th-century) was the member of the Parliament of England for Salisbury for multiple parliaments from 1378 to September 1388.
