= William Webbe (by 1499 – 1554) =

16th-century English politician

William Webbe (by 1499 – 1554), of Salisbury, Wiltshire, was an English politician.

He was a member (MP) of the parliament of England for Salisbury in 1529 and 1536.
