= Thomas Brodegate =

16th-century English politician

Thomas Brodegate (by 1485–1526) was an English politician.

Brodegate was mayor of Salisbury 1520–21. He was a member (MP) of the parliament of England for Salisbury in 1515.
