= Thomas Coke (MP for Salisbury) =

English politician, died 1523

Thomas Coke (by 1458 – 9 June 1523) was an English politician.

He was a member (MP) of the parliament of England for Salisbury in 1489, 1497, 1504, 1510, 1512 and 1515. He was Mayor of Salisbury in 1491–92 and 1510–11.
