= John Dove =

English parliamentary politician

John Dove (died 1664 or 1665) was a parliamentary politician during the English Civil War and Interregnum. He has sometimes been numbered amongst the regicides; however, although he sat as a Commissioner in the trial of Charles I at the Painted Chamber of the Palace of Westminster on the 12th, 13th, 19th, and 26 January (the last being the day that the sentence was agreed), Dove took no other part in the trial of Charles, did not sign the death warrant, and he was not punished at the Restoration.

Little is known about Dove's background, although his father, Henry, had been Mayor of Salisbury, Wiltshire in 1616. John was also a landowner and active in local politics, serving as Mayor of Salisbury in 1635. He and his brother Francis (Mayor of Salisbury in 1645 and 1650) were zealous parliamentarians, serving on a number of county committees from 1644, and he was elected to the Long Parliament for Salisbury in 1645 in the place of an ejected Royalist. He was made a colonel of the Wiltshire militia in 1650 and was commended in August 1651 by the Council of State for his zeal.

Dove's influence within the county and at Westminster enabled him to acquire a considerable fortune, with which he was able to purchase sequestered royalist and episcopal estates at Fountell in Hampshire, Blewbury in Berkshire, and Winterbourne Earls in Wiltshire. In 1655, whilst serving as Sheriff of Wiltshire, he was captured at Salisbury during the Penruddock uprising, narrowly escaping being hanged thanks to the intervention of some of the rebels. This clemency did not prevent Dove from having John Lucas, one of his saviours, executed. Another rebel, Hugh Grove, who was executed at Exeter, accused Dove of having given false witness against him. Grove's estate at Chisenbury Priory, near Enford, had been sequestered in 1650 and granted to Dove.

On 29 March 1655, Dove wrote to Secretary Thurloe that he had heard there was to be a commission of oyer and terminer for the trial of "rebels" (Royalists captured during and after the Penruddock uprising) in the west of England. He promised that there should be no juror chosen for either jury who could not be depended upon to be well disposed to the government of the day and recommended Thurloe to proceed capitally against the "chief actors that were commissionated, as they said, by Charles Stuart".

Dove was removed from the Salisbury corporation under its new charter of 1656, but was restored in 1659, when he also resumed his seat in the Rump Parliament. At the Restoration he made an abject submission and escaped punishment. He continued to act as an alderman in Salisbury until 1662, when he was removed by the Corporation Act. He retired to his estate at Ivychurch, near Alderbury, where he died some time before March 1665.
