= Maddington, Wiltshire =

Coordinates: 51.198°N 1.901°W

Maddington
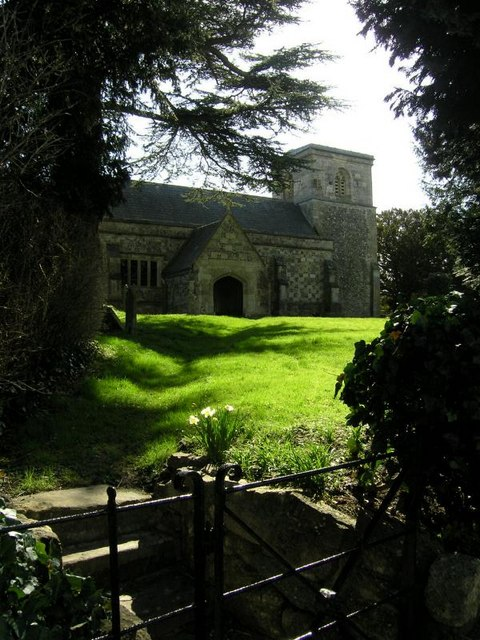
- St Mary's Church, Maddington

- Location within Wiltshire
- OS grid reference: SU070443
- Civil parish: Shrewton
- Unitary authority: Wiltshire
- Ceremonial county: Wiltshire
- Region: South West
- Country: England
- Sovereign state: United Kingdom
- Post town: SALISBURY
- Postcode district: SP3
- Dialling code: 01980
- Police: Wiltshire
- Fire: Dorset and Wiltshire
- Ambulance: South Western
- UK Parliament: East Wiltshire

Maddington is a small settlement and former civil parish, now in the parish of Shrewton, on Salisbury Plain in Wiltshire, England. It is on the River Till. Its nearest town is Amesbury, about 6 miles (10 km) to the southeast. In 1931 the parish had a population of 329.

At the time of the Domesday Book (1086), the manor was held by Amesbury Abbey. In 1825 the parish contained seventy-eight houses and had a population of 369. By 1841 the parish of Maddington extended east and south of the village.

For local government purposes, Maddington was added to the adjoining Shrewton parish on 1 April 1934. As Shrewton expanded during the 20th century, Maddington became an area of Shrewton.

St Mary's Church was built in the 13th century, then partly rebuilt in the 17th and 19th. It was declared redundant in 1975 and is now in the care of the Churches Conservation Trust.

Maddington Manor is a two-storey 18th-century house in brick, remodelled and extended at the front in the 1830s.

== See also ==
- Maddington Falls, Quebec, a small town in Canada which was named for this Maddington
