= William Webbe (died 1585) =

English politician

William Webbe (died 15 April 1585) was an English politician.

Webbe was Mayor of Salisbury from 1561 to 1562. He was a member (MP) of the parliament of England for Salisbury in 1559.
