= John Puxton =

English politician

John Puxton (died 1627) was an English politician.

He was a member (MP) of the parliament of England for Salisbury in 1601.
