= William Webbe alias Kellowe =

16th-century English politician

William Webbe alias Kellowe (by 1466 – 1523), of Salisbury, was an English politician.

He was a member (MP) of the parliament of England for Salisbury in 1504 and 1510.
