= Whaddon, Wiltshire =

Village in Wiltshire, England

Coordinates: 51.351°N 02.174°W

Whaddon
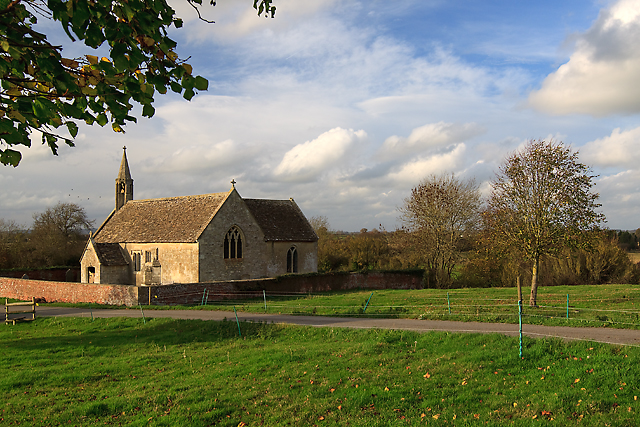
- Church of St Mary the Virgin

- Location within Wiltshire
- OS grid reference: ST880615
- Civil parish: Hilperton
- Unitary authority: Wiltshire
- Ceremonial county: Wiltshire
- Region: South West
- Country: England
- Sovereign state: United Kingdom
- Post town: TROWBRIDGE
- Postcode district: BA14
- Dialling code: 01225
- Police: Wiltshire
- Fire: Dorset and Wiltshire
- Ambulance: South Western
- UK Parliament: South West Wiltshire

Whaddon is a small village in the civil parish of Hilperton in Wiltshire, England.

== Location ==
The settlement is 2.5 miles (4.0 km) northeast of the county town of Trowbridge. By road, it is only accessible along Whaddon Lane, which connects it to the centre of Hilperton.

The River Avon and the Kennet and Avon Canal, half a mile apart, define the natural boundaries of the settlement. The river separates Whaddon from the village of Holt, and the canal separates it from Hilperton and Semington.

== History ==
Archaeological finds indicate occupation of Whaddon in the Iron Age, lasting into the time of Roman Britain. Under the name of Wadone, the village is mentioned in the Domesday Book of 1086, when it was held by a Saxon called Alvric and had two plough teams, with both meadow and pasture recorded. The Saxons used wood both for their buildings and their utensils, leaving little evidence of either in the archaeological record, but a possible fragment of late Saxon pottery has been found at Whaddon. The medieval manor of Whaddon included Paxcroft, now part of Hilperton; the total population would probably have been between 15 and 25.

It is likely that the village was severely affected by the plague of 1349, and thereafter was a small settlement, with new houses built further away from the church.

By 1428, the population of Whaddon counted ten householders; it rose to 36 in 1801 and further to 63 in 1821.

Sir Walter Long, 1st Baronet of Whaddon (1592–1672) was a notable 17th century resident landowner.

Whaddon Lane, running from Hilperton to Whaddon, in the past continued alongside the River Avon to Melksham, but is now a dead-end for motor vehicles. A footpath leads on to a packhorse bridge across the Avon which in the eighteenth century was repaired by the county. The village was larger then than now, and near the church there are hollows in the land where houses once stood.

In 1865, Whaddon was a parish in the hundred of Melksham and belonged to Walter Long, who lived at Hilperton. The church benefice was a rectory held by the Rector of Hilperton. It remained as a separate ecclesiastical and civil parish until 1894, when it was merged into Semington. In 1891 the parish had a population of 18. Since then, the population of Whaddon on its own has not been recorded. In the late 20th century it was transferred to become part of its more closely connected neighbour, Hilperton.

== St Mary's Church ==
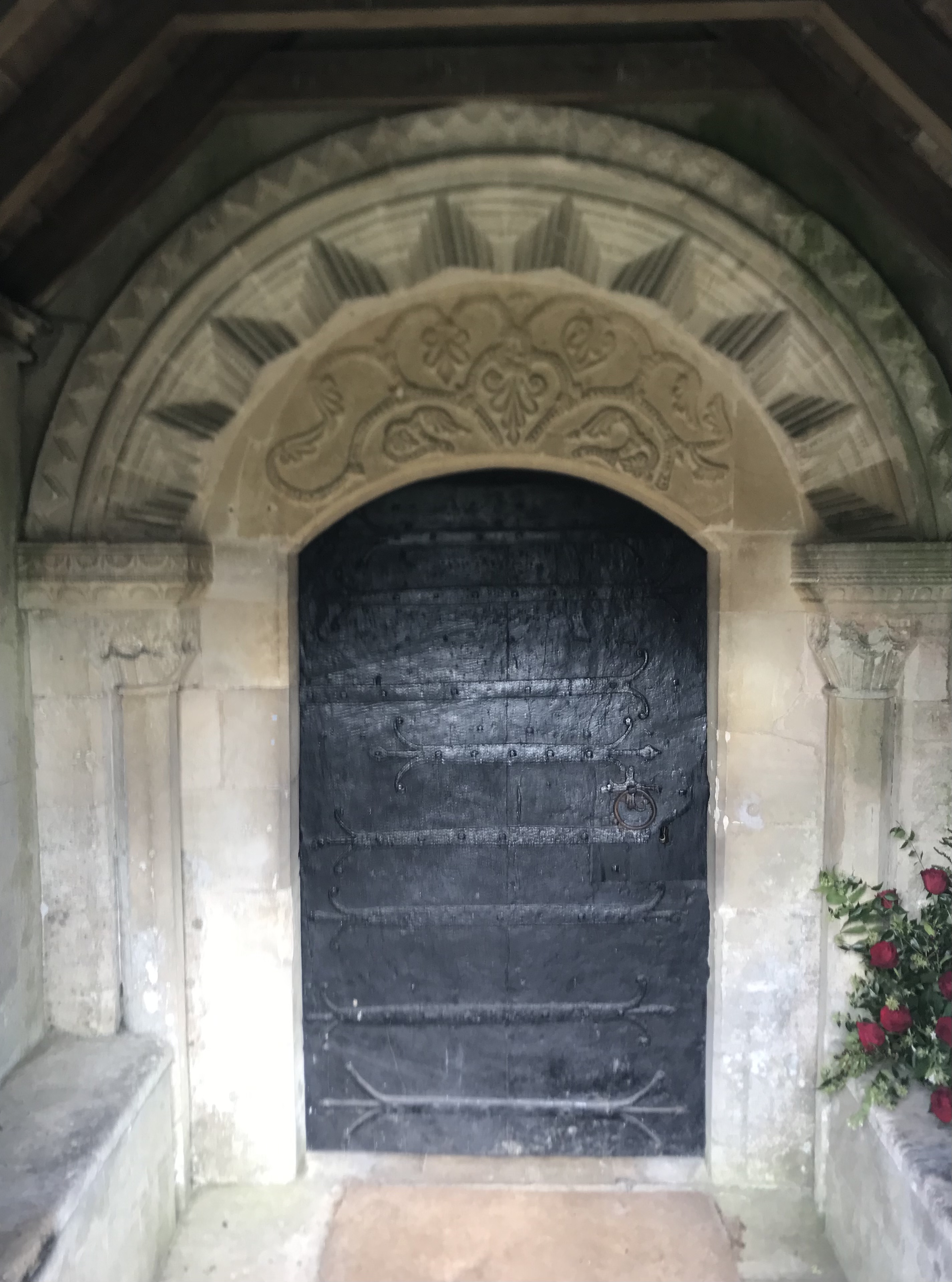
12th-century South door

The church of St. Mary the Virgin was built by the 12th century. It has a blocked 12th-century north doorway and a reconstructed 12th-century south doorway with a decorated tympanum. The south door is made of two 14th-century oak panels with heavy hinges. In 1676–8 the chancel was rebuilt and about 1778 was pulled down and rebuilt again. The present chancel was built in 1879 because damage to the foundations, caused by the work of 1778, had caused cracks in the walls and roof damage. The church was Grade II* listed in 1988.

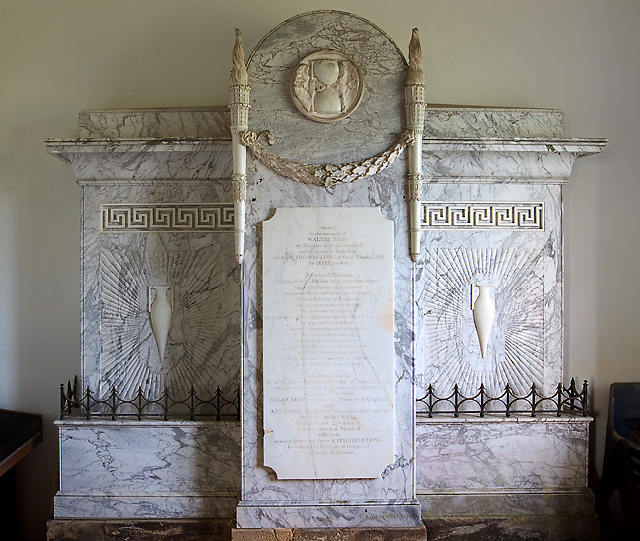
Monument to Walter Long

The surviving parish registers of baptisms, weddings, and burials begin in 1653. In 1656, during the Interregnum, the Rector was removed by the Puritans and was replaced by Martin Brunker, a public preacher, but after the Restoration of Charles II in 1660 the Rector returned.

In 1879, a bell cote was also built, at the initiative of W. P. Long, whose family had been lords of the manor since 1555. Long family tombs are in a small chapel north of the chantry and include an elaborate marble monument to Walter Long (died 1807).

The church was well attended in the early 20th century. So many people came to the harvest festival of 1907 that the service took place in the churchyard, outside, with the Rector standing on a tombstone.

== Whaddon House ==
Whaddon House, a manor house surrounded by parkland, was destroyed by fire in 1835. Whaddon Grove Farm now stands in its place. A 17th-century door in a moulded frame survives.
