= Roger Gauntlett =

English member of the Parliament of England

Roger Gauntlett (c. 1573 – 1627) of Bulhall House, Salisbury, Wiltshire was an English member of the Parliament of England for Salisbury between of 1614 and 1624.

He was the son of Richard Gauntlett of Salisbury, Mayor of Salisbury in 1594, and served as Mayor of Salisbury himself for 1607.

He was elected an MP to represent Salisbury in the parliaments of 1614, 1621, and 1624.

He married in 1600 Katherine, the daughter of Nicholas Huttoft, a merchant of Salisbury, and had 3 sons and 8 daughters.
