= List of people with surname Buckley =

This is a list of people with surname Buckley.

== Academia ==
- Ann Buckley (fl. from 1971), Irish musicologist
- Cheryl Buckley (born 1956), British design historian
- F. H. Buckley (born 1948), Canadian academic
- Francis Buckley (archaeologist) (1881–1948), British archaeologist
- Hallie Buckley (fl. from 2001), New Zealand bioarchaeologist
- Hannah Buckley (fl. from 2001), New Zealand ecologist
- John Buckley (historian) (born 1967), professor of military history at the University of Wolverhampton
- Jorunn Jacobsen Buckley (born 1944), Norwegian-American professor
- Lauren B. Buckley (fl. from 2000), American scientist
- Michael Buckley (professor) (fl. from 2009), professor at the University of Texas at Arlington
- Michael J. Buckley (1931–2019), theology professor at Santa Clara University
- Nicole Buckley (born 1960), Canadian biologist
- Patricia Buckley Ebrey (born 1947), American historian
- Peter Buckley (academic) (born 1949), British professor of multinational enterprise and international business
- Peter F. Buckley (fl. from 2000), American psychiatrist
- Rebecca Buckley (born 1933), American pediatrician and medical educator
- Ross P. Buckley (fl. from 2007), Australian academic and consultant
- Samuel Botsford Buckley (1809–1884), American botanist and naturalist
- Sonja Buckley (1918–2005), American virologist
- Suzanne Shelton Buckley (born 1946), American journalist and historian
- Theodore Alois Buckley (1825–1856), English classicist and translator
- Thomas Buckley (1942–2015), American anthropologist and Buddhist monastic
- Walter F. Buckley (1922–2006), American sociologist
- William Edward Buckley (1817–1892), Rawlinsonian Professor of Anglo-Saxon at the University of Oxford

== Arts and entertainment ==
=== Music ===
- Allie Crow Buckley fl. from 2017), American musician
- Barry Buckley (1938–2006), Australian musician
- Caroline Buckley (fl. from 1991), member of the British music duo Banderas
- David Buckley (born 1976), British composer of film and television scores
- Emerson Buckley (1916–1989), American conductor
- Frederick Buckley (1833–1864), minstrel show musician from the United States
- Jeff Buckley (1966–1997), American songwriter, son of Tim Buckley
- John Buckley (composer) (born 1951), Irish composer
- Jordan Buckley (fl. from 1998), guitarist for Every Time I Die and Better Lovers
- Jules Buckley (born 1980), English conductor
- Keith Buckley (born 1979), vocalist for Every Time I Die and The Damned Things
- Kyle Buckley (fl. from 2017), American musician
- Linda Buckley (born 1979), Irish composer and musician
- Mariel Buckley (fl. from 2012), Canadian singer–songwriter
- Olivia Buckley (1799–1847), English harpist, organist and composer
- R. J. Buckley (1847–1938), English music critic, composer and author
- Steve Buckley (musician) (fl. since 1985), British jazz musician
- T. Buckley (fl. from 2011), Canadian singer-songwriter
- Tim Buckley (1947–1975), American songwriter

=== Radio ===
- Bill Buckley (radio presenter) (born 1959), British radio presenter
- Dick Buckley (1925–2010), American radio presenter
- Jerry Buckley (journalist) (1891–1930), American radio commentator

=== Stage and screen ===
- A. J. Buckley (born 1978), American actor
- Andy Buckley (born 1965), American actor, screenwriter and stockbroker
- Anthony Buckley (born 1937), Australian film editor and producer
- Betty Buckley (born 1947), American actress
- Bryan Buckley (born 1963), American film and commercial director and screenwriter
- David Joss Buckley (born 1948), British screenwriter, playwright, author, actor, and musician
- Dillon Monroe Buckley (born 1993), American actress known as Maika Monroe
- Floyd Buckley (1877–1961), American actor
- Ginny Buckley (born 1970), British television presenter
- James Buckley (actor) (born 1987), English actor who stars in The Inbetweeners
- Jenny Buckley (born 1979), Irish television presenter
- Jessie Buckley (born 1989), Irish actress
- Keith Buckley (actor) (1941–2020), English actor
- Kenneth Buckley (1906–1982), British actor
- Kristen Buckley (born 1968), American screenwriter and author
- Lord Buckley (Richard Myrle Buckley, 1906–1960), American comedian
- Matthew Buckley (born c. 1988), British actor
- Michael Buckley (YouTuber) (born 1975), American Internet celebrity, comedian and vlogger
- Nicky Buckley (born 1965), Australian television presenter
- Norman Buckley (born 1955), American film director
- Priscilla Buckley (1921–2012), American journalist and author
- Robert Buckley (born 1981), American actor
- Sarah Jane Buckley (born 1968), British actress
- Sean Buckley (producer) (born c. 1967), Canadian producer and director

=== Visual arts ===
- Brad Buckley (born 1952), Australian artist
- Carmel Buckley (born 1956), British artist
- Jerry Buckley (cartoonist) (1932–2000), American cartoonist
- John Buckley (sculptor) (born 1945), English sculptor
- Laura Buckley (1977–2022), Irish artist
- Tim Buckley (comics) (born c. 1980), American webcomic artist

=== Other arts and entertainment ===
- Declan Buckley (fl. from 1997), Irish drag queen

== Writing ==
- Arabella Buckley (1840–1929), English writer and science educator
- Charles Burton Buckley (1844–1922), British journalist and newspaper editor in Singapore
- Christopher Buckley (journalist) (1905–1950), British journalist and historian
- Christopher Buckley (novelist) (born 1952), American author, son of William F. Buckley Jr.
- Christopher Buckley (poet) (born 1948), American poet
- Eunice Buckley, pen name of R. Allatini (1890–1980), Austrian-British novelist
- F. R. Buckley (1896–1976), English writer
- Fiona Buckley, pen name of Valerie Anand (1937–2024), English author
- Gail Lumet Buckley (1937–2024), American journalist and author
- Elsie Finnimore Buckley (1882–1959), English writer and translator
- Jonathan Buckley (writer) (born 1956), British author
- Leila Buckley (1917–2013), English poet, writer and translator
- Michael Buckley (author) (born 1969), American children's book author
- Patricia Buckley Bozell (1927–2008), American writer, sister of William F. and James L. Buckley
- Reid Buckley (1930–2014), American writer
- Richard Buckley (journalist) (1948–2021), American LGBT writer and journalist
- Roger Buckley (1937–2020), American historian, novelist, and Asian Americanist
- Steve Buckley (journalist) (born 1956), American sports journalist
- Veronica Buckley (born 1956), New Zealand–born biographer
- Vincent Buckley (1925–1988), Australian poet, teacher, editor, essayist, and critic
- Will Buckley (journalist) (born c. 1965), journalist and author

== Business ==
- Abel Buckley (1835–1908), British manufacturer
- Ann Buckley (industrialist) (1806–1872), English factory owner
- Buck Buckley (born 1960), American tech executive
- Dan Buckley (fl. from 1989), American comic books executive
- Francis Buckley (businessman) (1921–2016), Canadian businessman
- George W. Buckley (born 1947), British businessman
- Mortimer J. Buckley (born 1969), American financial executive
- Sean Buckley (entrepreneur) (fl. from 1994), Australian entrepreneur and racehorse owner

== Law ==
- Denys Buckley (1906–1998), English barrister and judge
- Henry Buckley, 1st Baron Wrenbury (1845–1935), British barrister and judge
- William F. Buckley Sr. (1881–1958), American lawyer and oil developer

== Medicine ==
- Ellen Buckley (1909–2009), American military nurse
- Winifred Buckley (1883–1959), Indian-born surgeon

== Military ==
- Alexander Buckley (1891–1918), Australian Victoria Cross recipient
- Cecil Buckley (1830–1872), Royal Navy officer, Victoria Cross recipient
- Denis Buckley (Medal of Honor) (c. 1844–1864), Canadian soldier who fought in the American Civil War
- Dennis J. Buckley Jr. (1920–1943), United States Navy sailor and Silver Star recipient
- Felix Buckley (1724–1823), British Army officer
- Howard Major Buckley (1863–1941), American soldier
- Jimmy Buckley (died 1943), British World War II pilot and POW
- John Buckley (VC) (1813–1876), British Victoria Cross recipient
- John C. Buckley (1842–1913), American Civil War soldier and Medal of Honor recipient
- Maurice Buckley (1891–1921), Australian Victoria Cross recipient
- Michael Buckley Jr. (1902–2006), United States Army officer

== Politics and government ==
=== Australia ===
- Arthur Buckley (1891–1974), trade union leader and member of the New South Wales Legislative Assembly
- Francis Buckley (politician) (1894–1971), trade union leader and member of the New South Wales Legislative Assembly
- George Buckley (Australian politician) (1881–1958), trade union leader and member of the New South Wales Legislative Assembly
- Henry Buckley (1813–1888), British-born member of the New South Wales Legislative Assembly
- Ray Buckley (Australian politician) (1912–1989), member of the Victorian Legislative Assembly

=== Canada ===
- John Buckley (Canadian politician) (1863–1942), member of the Legislative Assembly of Alberta
- John Francis Buckley (1891–1931), barrister, soldier, and federal politician

=== Ireland ===
- Daniel Buckley, birth name of Domhnall Ua Buachalla (1866–1963), politician and governor–general of the Irish Free State
- Margaret Buckley (1879–1962), Irish republican and Sinn Féin leader, president of Sinn Féin
- Pat Buckley (Irish politician) (born 1969), TD from Cork
- Seán Buckley (politician) (1873–1963), revolutionary and TD from Cork

=== New Zealand ===
- George Buckley (New Zealand politician) (1830–1895), farmer and politician from Canterbury
- Patrick Buckley (politician) (1841–1896), Irish New Zealand soldier, lawyer and politician

=== United Kingdom ===
- Albert Buckley (1877–1965), British Conservative politician
- Edmund Buckley (politician, born 1780) (1780–1867), British Conservative MP
- Sir Edmund Buckley, 1st Baronet (1834–1910), British Conservative MP
- Edward Pery Buckley (1796–1873), British Liberal and Whig politician
- George Buckley (British politician) (1935–1991), Labour MP
- Jonathan Buckley (born 1991), DUP politician
- Julia Buckley (fl. from 2017), Labour MP for Shrewsbury
- Michael Buckley (civil servant) (born 1939), former Parliamentary and Health Service Ombudsman
- Nathaniel Buckley (1821–1892), British Liberal politician
- Victor Buckley (1838–1882), British civil servant

=== United States ===
- Alice Buckley (born c. 1993)
- Anna Buckley (1924–2003)
- Barbara Buckley (born 1960), American attorney and Democratic Party politician
- Brad Buckley (politician) (born 1966), Texan politician
- C. W. Buckley (1835–1906)
- Caleb F. Buckley (1841–1879)
- Charles A. Buckley (1890–1967)
- Christopher Augustine Buckley (1845–1922), "Blind Boss" Buckley, 19th century political boss in San Francisco, California
- Constantine W. Buckley (1815–1865)
- E. Ross Buckley (1921–1992)
- Esther Buckley (1948–2013), American educator
- Gavin Buckley (born 1963), Australian-American Democratic politician
- Horace Lawson Buckley (born 1941)
- James L. Buckley (1923–2023), American politician, jurist, diplomat, author, and corporate director
- James R. Buckley (1870–1945), U.S. Representative from Illinois
- James V. Buckley (1894–1954), U.S. Representative from Illinois
- John Buckley (attorney) (1885–1959), Connecticut politician
- John Buckley (Virginia politician) (born 1953)
- John F. Buckley (1892–1965), Wisconsin politician
- John J. Buckley (mayor) (1915–1997), Massachusetts politician, mayor of Lawrence, Massachusetts
- John J. Buckley (sheriff) (1929–1994), Sheriff of Middlesex County, Massachusetts
- John L. Buckley (1900–after 1948), New York politician
- John R. Buckley (1932–2020), Massachusetts politician
- Peter J. Buckley (born 1957), Oregon politician
- Pola Buckley (born before 1978), American accountant and former Maine State Auditor
- Raymond Buckley (born 1959), American politician from New Hampshire
- T. Garry Buckley (1922–2012), American politician, active in Vermont
- Thomas H. Buckley (1897–1960), American politician who served as Massachusetts Auditor
- Thomas J. Buckley (1895–1964), American politician who served as Massachusetts Auditor
- Victoria Buckley (1949–1999)
- William F. Buckley Jr. (1925–2008), American writer and conservative leader

== Religion ==
- Eric Buckley (1868–1948), English clergyman
- James Buckley (bishop) (1770–1828), English Roman Catholic bishop of Geras
- James Buckley (priest) (1849–1924), Archdeacon of Llandaff
- James Monroe Buckley (1836–1920), American Methodist doctor, preacher, and editor
- John Buckley (bishop) (born 1939), Irish Catholic bishop
- John Buckley (c. 1530–1598), Welsh martyr also known as John Jones
- Pat Buckley (priest) (1952–2024), excommunicated Irish Catholic priest
- Sigebert Buckley (1520–1610), only monk of Westminster to survive the Reformation

== Sport ==
=== Association football ===
- Adam Buckley (born 1979), English professional footballer
- Alan Buckley (born 1951), British football manager
- Brandon Buckley (born 2000), English footballer
- Chris Buckley (footballer) (1886–1973), English footballer
- Delron Buckley (born 1977), South African footballer
- Frank Buckley (footballer) (1882–1964), English footballer
- Garry Buckley (born 1993), Irish footballer
- Gary Buckley (born 1961), English footballer
- Georges Buckley (born 1974), Peruvian football referee
- Graham Buckley (born 1963), Scottish footballer
- Jack Buckley (English footballer) (1903–1985)
- John Buckley (footballer, born 1962) (born 1962), Scottish football manager and former footballer
- John Buckley (footballer, born 1999) (born 1999), English footballer
- Keith Buckley (footballer) (born 1992), Irish footballer
- Liam Buckley (born 1960), Irish footballer
- Mick Buckley (English footballer) (1953–2013), English footballer
- Neil Buckley (born 1968), English footballer
- Paddy Buckley (1925–2008), Scottish footballer
- Pat Buckley (footballer) (born 1946), Scottish footballer
- Pru Buckley (born 1973), English footballer
- Steve Buckley (footballer) (born 1953), English footballer
- Steve Buckley (soccer) (born 1950), American soccer player
- Tara Buckley O'Sullivan (born 1962 as Tara Buckley)
- Walter Buckley (footballer) (1906–1985), English footballer
- Will Buckley (footballer) (born 1989), English footballer

=== Australian rules football ===
- Ben Buckley (born 1967), Australian businessman and footballer
- Bill Buckley (Australian rules footballer) (1896–1946)
- Brian Buckley (political advisor) (1935–2013), played for Footscray
- Brian Buckley (footballer, born 1935) (1935–2014), played for Carlton
- Dylan Buckley (born 1993)
- Ed Buckley (1889–1932)
- Jack Buckley (footballer, born 1907) (1907–1980)
- Jack Buckley (footballer, born 1997)
- Jim Buckley (born 1959)
- Mark Buckley (Australian footballer) (born 1962)
- Nathan Buckley (born 1972)
- Paul Buckley (1913–1988)
- Simon Buckley (born 1987)
- Stephen Buckley (born 1959)
- Ted Buckley (1912–1984)

=== Gridiron football ===
- Andrew Buckley (Canadian football) (born 1993), Canadian football quarterback
- Curtis Buckley (born 1970), football cornerback
- Eldra Buckley (born 1985)
- Hayden Buckley (1930–2013), American football player and coach
- Marcus Buckley (born 1971)
- Quayshawne Buckley (born 1991)
- Ralph Buckley (1907–1979)
- Terrell Buckley (born 1971), American football player and coach

=== Baseball ===
- Dick Buckley (baseball) (1858–1929), American Major League Baseball (MLB) player
- Jean Buckley (1931–2019), All-American Girls Professional Baseball League player
- John Buckley (baseball) (1869–1942), American baseball pitcher
- Kevin Buckley (born 1959), American MLB player
- Mathew Buckley (born 1973), Australian baseball player
- Troy Buckley (born 1968), American college baseball coach

=== Boxing ===
- Johnny Buckley (boxing manager) (died 1963), Irish boxing manager and promoter
- Peter Buckley (boxer) (born 1969), English journeyman welterweight boxer
- Regan Buckley (born 1997), Irish boxer

=== Cricket ===
- Alfred Buckley (1829–1900), English cricketer
- Cyril Buckley (1905–1974), English cricketer
- Duncombe Buckley (1831–1855), English cricketer and soldier
- G. B. Buckley (1885–1962), English surgeon and cricket historian
- George Buckley (cricketer, born 1889) (1889–1935), English cricketer
- John Buckley (cricketer) (born 1956), South African cricketer
- Ryan Buckley (born 1994), English cricketer

=== Gaelic football ===
- Bobby Buckley (1931–2013), Irish Gaelic footballer
- David Buckley (Gaelic footballer) (born 2001), Irish Gaelic footballer
- Donie Buckley (born early 1960s), Irish Gaelic footballer and coach
- Johnny Buckley (Gaelic footballer) (born 1989), Irish Gaelic footballer
- Mark Buckley (Gaelic footballer) (born 1998), Irish Gaelic footballer
- Mick Buckley (Sarsfields Gaelic footballer) (born 1944)
- Paul John Buckley (born c. 1956), Irish Gaelic footballer
- Rena Buckley (born c. 1987), Irish Gaelic football and camogie player

=== Hurling and camogie ===
- Andy Buckley (hurler) (fl. 1884–1916), Irish hurler
- Austin Buckley (born 1960), Irish hurler
- Cillian Buckley (born 1992), Irish hurler
- Connie Buckley (1915–2009), Irish hurler
- Danny Buckley (born 1957), Irish hurler
- Din Joe Buckley (1919–2009), Irish hurler
- Éamonn Buckley (born 1982), Irish hurler
- John Buckley (Aghabullogue hurler) (1863–1935), Irish hurler
- John Buckley (Glen Rovers hurler) (born 1958), Irish hurler
- John Buckley (Newtownshandrum hurler) (born 1953), Irish hurler
- Kathleen Buckley (fl. 1934–1940), Irish camogie player
- Pat Buckley (Aghabullogue hurler) (fl. 1890–1892), Irish hurler
- Pat Buckley (Cork hurler) (born 1965), Irish hurler
- Seán Buckley (hurler) (born 1938), Irish hurler
- William Buckley (hurler) (born 2004), Irish hurler

=== Rugby league football ===
- Alan Buckley (rugby league) (1948–2008), British rugby league footballer
- Bill Buckley (rugby league) (1906–1973), Australian rugby league footballer
- David Buckley (rugby league) (fl. 2000s), Irish rugby league footballer
- Dawson Buckley (1917–1993), Australian rugby league footballer
- Owen Buckley (born 1998), English rugby league footballer

=== Rugby union football ===
- Denis Buckley (born 1990), rugby union footballer from Ireland
- Jim Buckley (rugby union) (fl. from 1973), Irish rugby union footballer
- Rhys Buckley (born 1989), Welsh rugby union footballer
- Scott Buckley (born 2000), Irish rugby union footballer
- Shane Buckley (born 1992), Irish rugby union footballer
- Tony Buckley (born 1980), Irish rugby union footballer

=== Other sports ===
- Alice Buckley (born 2007), Australian racing driver
- Andrew Buckley (field hockey) (born 1973), New Zealand field hockey player
- Brendan Buckley (born 1977), American ice hockey player
- Bridget Buckley (born 1955), British rower
- Fred Buckley (1883–1965), British middle-distance runner
- Hayden Buckley (golfer) (born 1996), American golfer
- Joaquin Buckley (born 1994), American mixed martial artist
- Mark Buckley (tennis) (born 1960), American tennis player
- Markino Buckley (born 1986), Jamaican hurdler
- Mike Buckley (born 1963), American stock car racing driver
- Pat Buckley (bobsleigh) (fl. late 1940s), American bobsleigher
- Peter Buckley (cyclist) (1944–1969), British professional racing cyclist
- Ronnie Buckley (born 1986), Australian discus thrower
- Roy Buckley (1946–2021), American ten–pin bowler
- Tim Buckley (basketball) (born 1963), American college basketball coach

== Other fields ==
- Bryan Burton Buckley, 2nd Baron Wrenbury (1890–1940)
- Carol Buckley (born 1954), American elephant caregiver
- Christine Buckley (1946–2014), Irish activist
- Daniel Buckley (1890–1918), one of the survivors of the sinking of the RMS Titanic
- Declan Buckley (designer) (fl. from 1999), British landscape designer
- Sir Edmund Buckley, 2nd Baronet (1861–1919)
- Eliza Buckley Ingalls (1848–1918), American temperance activist
- George Buckley (explorer) (1866–1937), New Zealand soldier and adventurer
- Harold Robert Buckley (1896–1958), American World War I flying ace
- Jay C. Buckey (born 1956), American astronaut
- Karen Buckley (1991–2015), Scottish murder victim
- Oliver Ellsworth Buckley (1887–1959), American electrical engineer
- Melanie Buckley (born 1982), English chess master
- Nick Buckley (born 1968), British charity worker
- Pamela Buckley (1951–1976), American murder victim
- Patricia Buckley (1926–2007), American socialite, wife of William F. Buckley Jr.
- Richard Buckley (courtier) (1928–2022), Royal Navy officer and courtier
- Richard Buckley (fl. 1930s), New Zealand farmer whose trousers exploded
- St. John McLean Buckley (1869–1915), New Zealand farmer
- William Buckley (convict) (1776–1856), Australian convict
- William Francis Buckley (1928–1985), CIA station chief captured by Hezbollah and killed

== See also ==
- Senator Buckley (disambiguation)
