= Michael Buckley =

Michael Buckley may refer to:

- Michael Buckley (author) (born 1969), children's book author
- Michael Buckley (civil servant) (born 1939), former Parliamentary and Health Service Ombudsman
- Michael Buckley (YouTuber) (born 1975), American Internet celebrity, comedian and vlogger
- Michael Buckley (professor), clinical professor at the University of Texas at Arlington
- Mick Buckley (English footballer) (1953–2013), English footballer
- Mick Buckley (Sarsfields Gaelic footballer) (born 1944)
- Mick Buckley (Caragh Gaelic footballer), played in the 1919 All-Ireland Senior Football Championship final
- Michael J. Buckley (1931–2019), Jesuit professor of theology at Santa Clara University
- Michael Buckley Jr. (1902–2006), U.S. Army officer
- Mike Buckley, American stock car racing driver
- 146921 Michaelbuckley, an asteroid
