= Rubus conanicutensis =

Scientific classification
- Kingdom: Plantae
- Clade: Tracheophytes
- Clade: Angiosperms
- Clade: Eudicots
- Clade: Rosids
- Order: Rosales
- Family: Rosaceae
- Genus: Rubus
- Species: R. conanicutensis

Binomial name
- Rubus conanicutensis L.H.Bailey 1945

Berry and plant

Rubus conanicutensis called the Conanicut Island blackberry, is a rare North American species of flowering plant in the rose family. It has been found only in the State of Rhode Island in the northeastern United States; particularly, on its namesake island, Conanicut Island] in Narragansett Bay, which is part of the town of Jamestown, Rhode Island.

The genetics of Rubus is extremely complex, so that it is difficult to decide on which groups should be recognized as species. There are many rare species with limited ranges such as this. Further study is suggested to clarify the taxonomy.
