= Thomas Francis Prendergast =

- Born: April 2, 1871; Waterford, Ireland
- Died: April 26, 1913 (aged 42); Philadelphia, Pennsylvania
- Burial place: Greenwood Cemetery, Philadelphia
- Military career
- Allegiance: United States of America
- Branch: United States Marine Corps
- Service years: 1893 - 1907
- Rank: Sergeant
- Unit: Eighth Army Corps (temporary attachment)
- Conflicts: Philippine–American War
- Awards: Medal of Honor

Thomas Francis Prendergast or Pendegrast (2 April 1871, Waterford, Ireland – 26 April 1913, Philadelphia, Pennsylvania) was a recipient of the Medal of Honor for his United States Marine Corps service in the Philippine–American War.

== Military service ==
Prendergast joined the Marine Corps from Boston in May 1893, and was honorably discharged in July 1907.

While a corporal, Prendergast was one of three Marines attached to the Eighth Army Corps, involved in the jungle fighting against the insurgent forces of Emilio Aguinaldo. In his Medal of Honor citation, he was cited for "distinguished conduct in the presence of the enemy in battle" for actions on March 25, 27, and 29 and April 5, 1899. In this period, American forces cleared the insurgents from the vicinity of Manila and captured the rebel capital of Malolos, forcing Aguinaldo's command northward into the mountains. His Medal of Honor was awarded on July 19, 1901.

The other men awarded Medals of Honor for these actions were Private Howard Major Buckley and Private Joseph Leonard.

Prendergast is buried in Greenwood Cemetery, Philadelphia. His grave, which had long been unmarked, received a gravestone in 2004, with military honors.

== Medal of Honor citation ==
Rank and organization: Corporal, U.S. Marine Corps. Born: April 2, 1871, Waterford, Ireland. Accredited to: Massachusetts. G.O. No.: 55 July 19, 1901.

Citation:

For distinguished conduct in the presence of the enemy in battle while with the Eighth Army Corps, 25, 27, March 29, and April 5, 1899.

== See also ==
- List of Medal of Honor recipients
- List of Philippine–American War Medal of Honor recipients
