= Steve Buckley =

Steve Buckley may refer to:

- Steve Buckley (footballer) (born 1953), English footballer
- Steve Buckley (journalist) (born 1956), Irish American journalist
- Steve Buckley (musician), British jazz musician
- Steve Buckley (soccer) (born 1950), American soccer player
