= Brian Buckley =

Brian Buckley may refer to:

- Brian Buckley (footballer, born 1935) (1935–2014), Australian rules footballer for Carlton and Port Melbourne
- Brian Buckley (political advisor) (1935–2013), Australian rules footballer for Footscray, journalist and political advisor
