= Frank Buckley =

Frank or Francis Buckley may refer to:

- Frank Buckley (athlete) (1883–1965), British Olympic athlete
- Francis Buckley (businessman) (1921–2016), known as Frank, Canadian businessman
- Frank Buckley (footballer) (1882–1964), English football player and manager
- F.H. Buckley (born 1948), Canadian-American professor of law and speechwriter
- Francis Buckley (archaeologist) (1881–1948), British Army officer and archaeologist
- Francis Buckley (politician) (1894–1971), Australian politician
