= Baron Wrenbury =

Barony in the Peerage of the United Kingdom

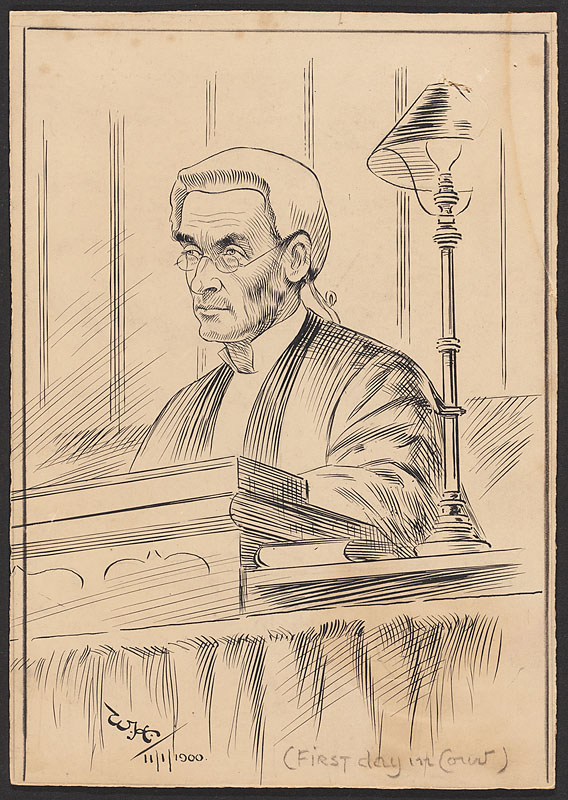
Henry Buckley, 1st Baron Wrenbury

Baron Wrenbury, of Old Castle, Dallington in the County of Sussex, is a title in the Peerage of the United Kingdom. It was created in 1915 for the barrister and judge Sir Henry Buckley. He served as a Judge of the High Court of Justice and as a Lord Justice of Appeal. As of 2014 the title is held by his great-grandson, the fourth Baron, who succeeded his father in 2014. The Hon. Sir Denys Buckley, younger son of the first Baron, was also a Judge of the High Court of Justice and Lord Justice of Appeal.

== Barons Wrenbury (1915) ==
- Henry Burton Buckley, 1st Baron Wrenbury (1845–1935)
- Bryan Burton Buckley, 2nd Baron Wrenbury (1890–1940)
- John Burton Buckley, 3rd Baron Wrenbury (1927–2014)
- William Edward Buckley, 4th Baron Wrenbury (b. 1966)

The heir presumptive is the present holder's second cousin Arthur Burton Buckley (b. 1967), whose heir is his son Adam Burton Buckley (b. 1997)

Coat of arms of Baron Wrenbury
Crest On a mount Vert a demi-stag at gaze Gules attired and gorged with a collar a chain attached reflexed over the back Or supporting a garb of the last. Escutcheon Azure a chevron cottised between two stags' heads cabossed in chief and a garb in base all Or on a chief engrailed Ermine a buckle between two crosses pattée fitchée Gules. Supporters On either side a buck at gaze Gules collared attired and chained Or. Motto To My Utmost
