= Senator Buckley (disambiguation) =

James L. Buckley (1923–2023) was an American judge and politician.

Senator Buckley may also refer to:

- Anna Buckley (1924–2003), Massachusetts State Senate
- John L. Buckley (1900–after 1948), New York State Senate
- T. Garry Buckley (1922–2012), Vermont State Senate
