= Minstead Lodge =

Building in Hampshire, England

Coordinates: 50°54′01″N 1°35′41″W

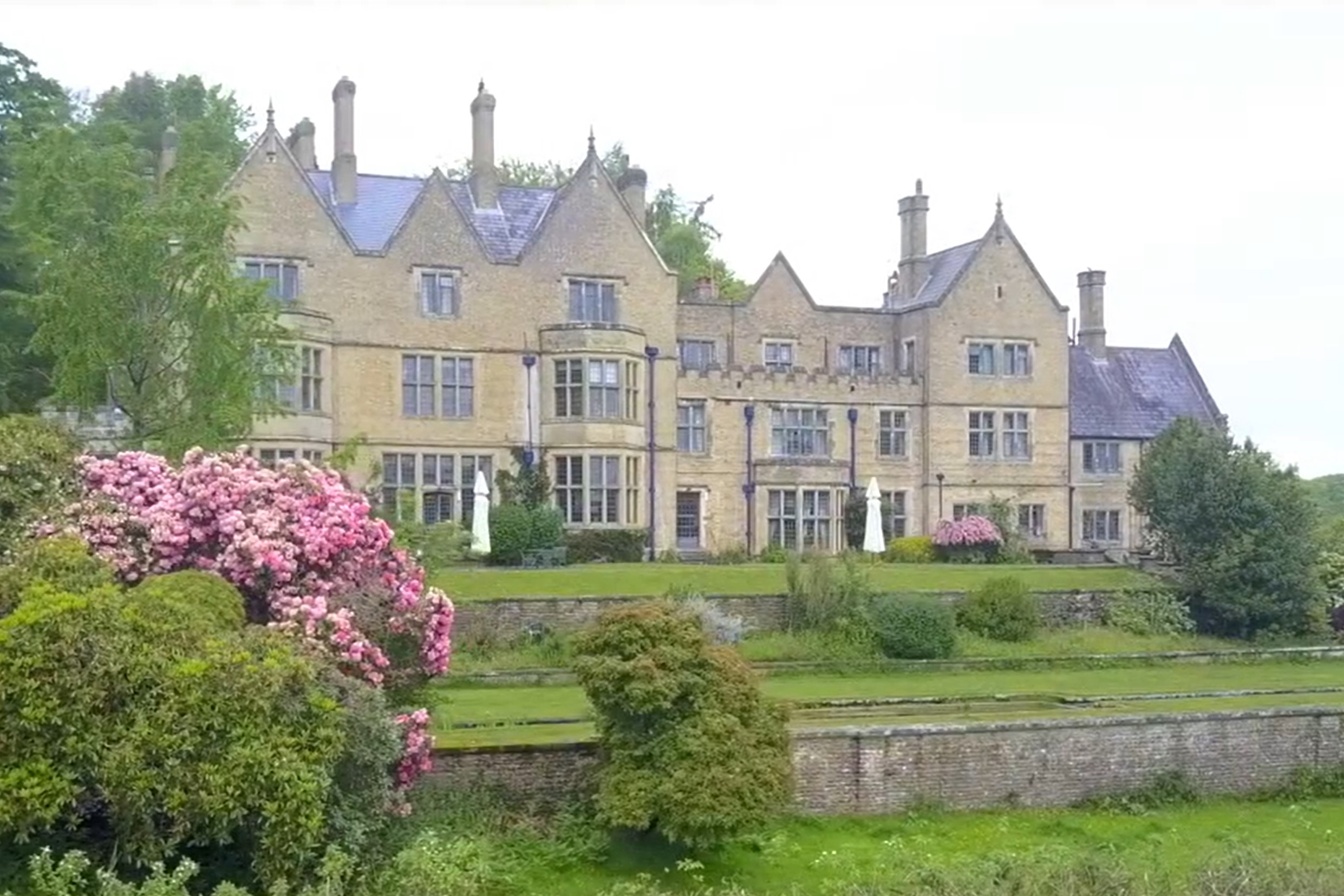
Minstead Lodge

Minstead Lodge in Hampshire is a building of historical significance built in about 1830 and is Grade II listed on the English Heritage Register. Today it is owned by the Minstead Trust.

== Residents ==
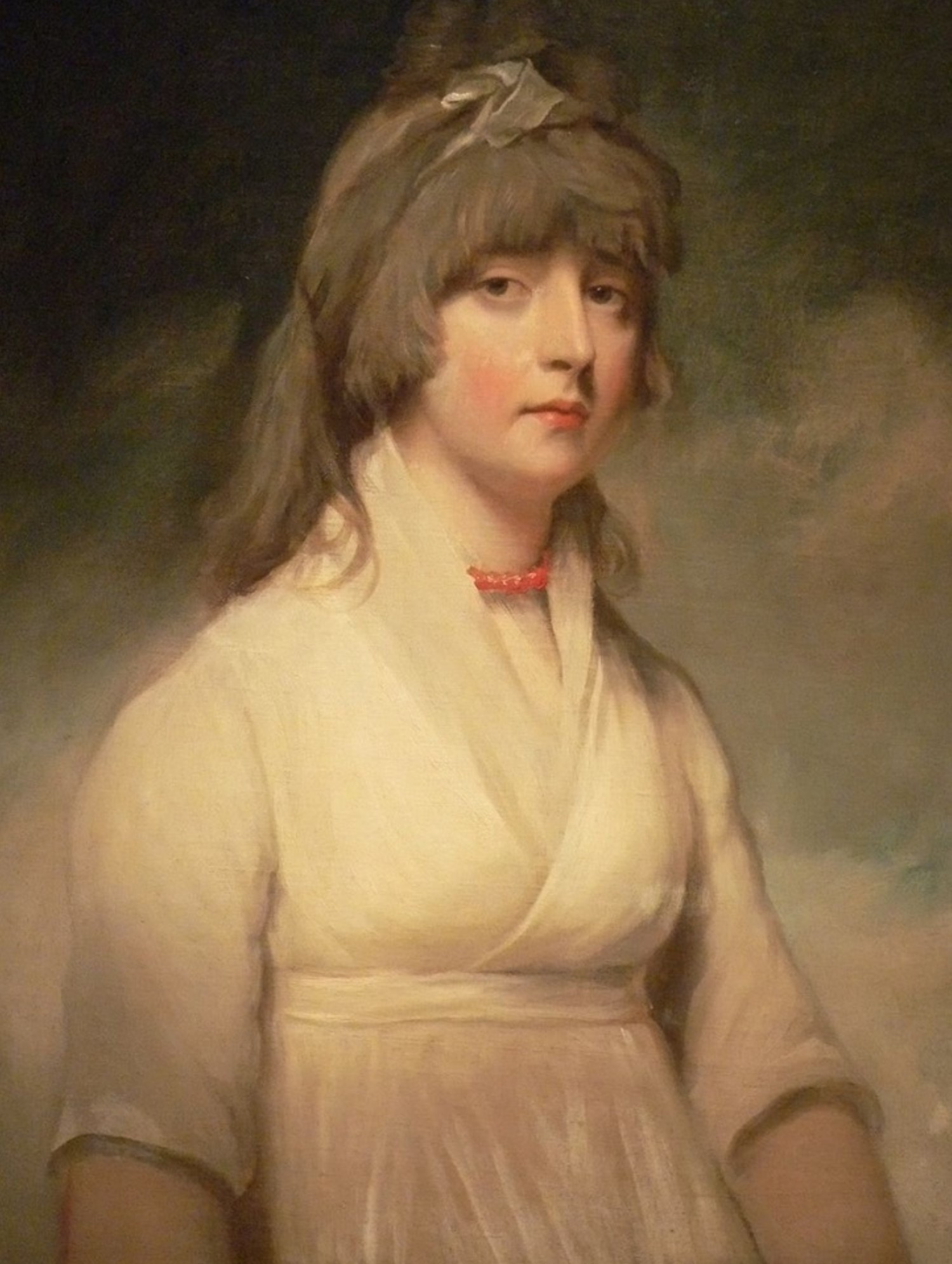
Lady Georgina Buckley wife of the originator of Minstead Lodge Lieutenant Colonel Edward Pery Buckley

Lieutenant Colonel Edward Pery Buckley (1760-1840) built Minstead Lodge in about 1830. In 1782 he married Lady Georgina West (1766-1832) who was the daughter of John West, 2nd Earl De La Warr. When Edward died in 1840, his eldest son, Edward Pery Buckley, who sold the Lodge in 1852 to William Robert Preston, a landowner and partner in the engineering firm Fawcett, Preston and Co in Liverpool. By the late 1880s the Preston family rented the house to wealthy tenants, the first being Archibald Acheson, 4th Earl of Gosford. For a few years William Deane Preston, the eldest son of Major William Berthon Preston lived at the house and then it was sold to Jane Hart Matthews Duncan, widow of physician James Matthews Duncan. She lived at the Lodge until her death in 1915.

The next residents were David John Carnegie, the 10th Earl of Northesk, succeeded at his death in 1921 by his son David Carnegie, 11th Earl of Northesk. In 1924 he sold the house to the 6th Lord Congleton, director of a manufacturing company. At his death in 1932, his widow remained at Minstead Lodge with their children. Her son William, 7th Lord Congleton, inherited Minstead Lodge on coming of age in 1946; and his mother bought and removed to the Island of Ulva, in Scotland. The 7th Baron Congleton, a Lieutenant in the Royal Navy and a bachelor, lived at Minstead Lodge until his death in a car accident in 1967. The house was subsequently sold to the Ward family and in 1974 was purchased by Tim Selwood, an Anglican priest who used the property as a community house. In 1986 the Minstead Trust charity was established and took control of the estate. It provided training in hospitality and catering for people with learning disabilities. The Trusts supports more than 200 people. In the last few years, the Lodge has begun hosting weddings, conferences and events. The income from these events supports the Trust’s work to help more people with learning disabilities live independent and fulfilled lives.
