= Greenwood Cemetery (Philadelphia) =

Historic cemetery in Philadelphia

Greenwood (Knights of Pythias) Cemetery
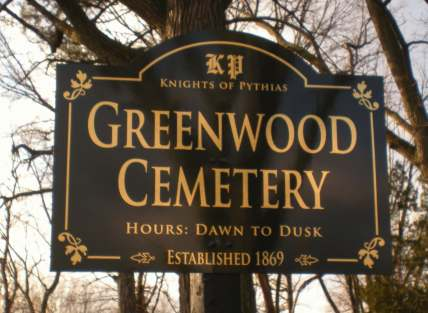
- Interactive map of Greenwood (Knights of Pythias) Cemetery

Details
- Established: December 9, 1869
- Location: 930 Adams Avenue; Philadelphia, Pennsylvania
- Country: United States
- Coordinates: 40.022°N 75.097°W
- Type: private
- Owned by: Greenwood Holdings, LLC
- Size: 43 acres (170,000 m^{2})
- No. of graves: 20,000
- Website: Greenwood Cemetery
- Find a Grave: Greenwood (Knights of Pythias) Cemetery

Philadelphia Register of Historic Places
- Designated: August 9, 2000

Greenwood (Knights of Pythias) Cemetery is a historic cemetery in the Frankford neighborhood of Philadelphia, Pennsylvania, United States. It was established in 1869, is 43 acres in size and contains approximately 20,000 graves.

It was established by the Knights of Pythias to provide burials for their members. Over time, the cemetery suffered from abandonment and vandalism. The cemetery became a site for illegal dumping and the rear portion of the property became wildly overgrown. In August 2000, the cemetery was added to the list of Philadelphia Register of Historic Places.

The Friends of Greenwood Cemetery and Greenwood Holdings have been successful in cleaning up the cemetery and renovating the house on the property. In 2008, approximately 1,500 bodies were reinterred from the rear portion of the cemetery to a mass grave near the front of the property to allow construction of a parking lot for the adjacent Cancer Treatment Centers of America.

== History ==
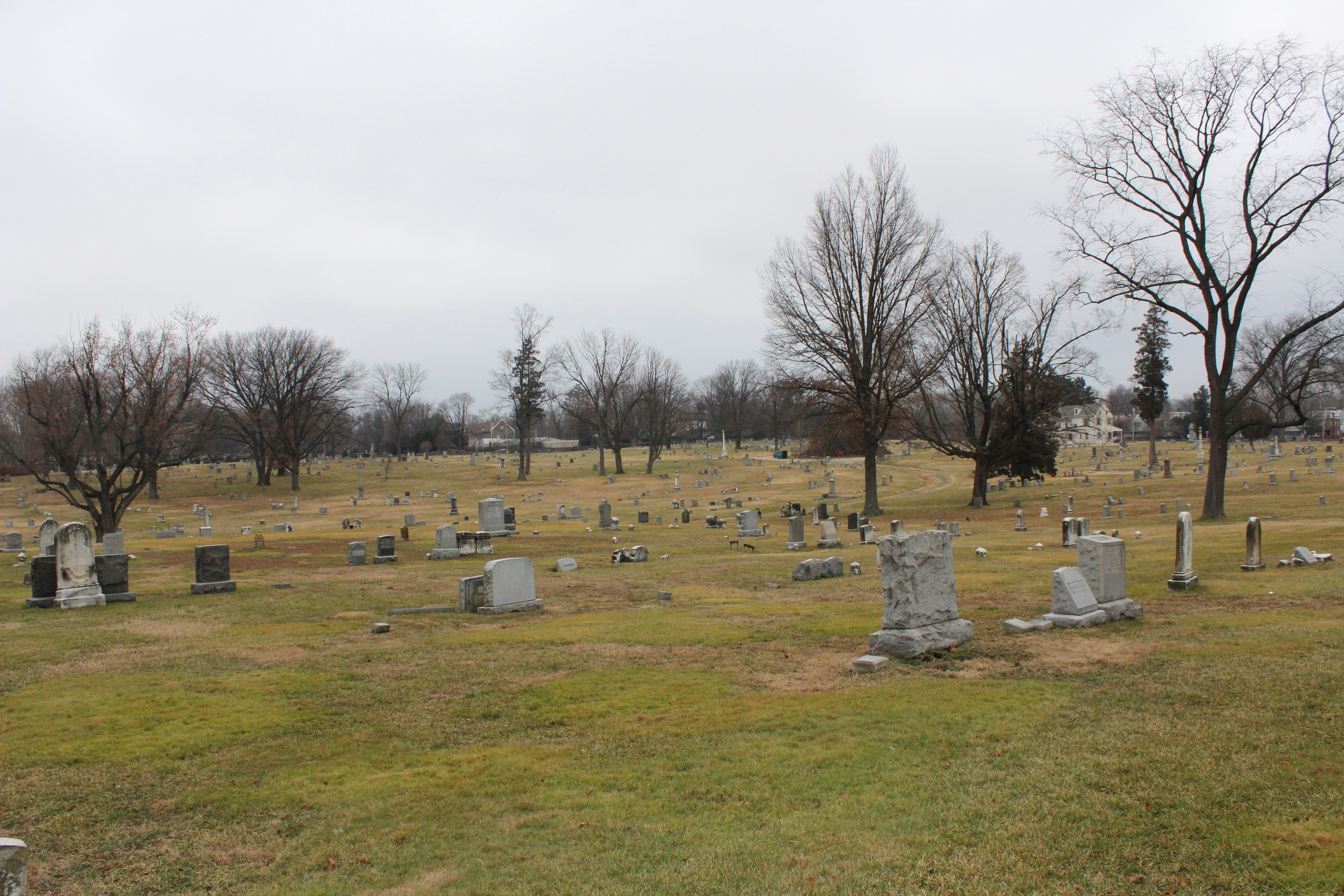
Greenwood Cemetery

The cemetery was established on December 9, 1869 on 43 acres (170,000 m^{2}) on the estate of Commodore Stephen Decatur, Sr. known as "Mount Airy". The cemetery was founded by George Chandler Paul of the fraternal organization, Knights of Pythias, for the interment of its members and others. It was originally chartered as "The Greenwood Cemetery Company of Philadelphia", but the charter was changed to the "Knights of Pythias Greenwood Cemetery Company of Philadelphia" on March 18, 1870.

Portions of the historic house at the entrance date back to 1750–1775. Dr. Benjamin Rush, a signer of the Declaration of Independence, lived on the farm in the late 18th century. In the early 19th century, a major addition to the house gave it the appearance of a vernacular federal structure. Recent evidence, however, dates the construction of the house to the 1830s or later.

Greenwood Cemetery was modeled after cemetery designs created for the United States National Cemetery System established to bury soldiers from the American Civil War. Designed by architect Thomas S. Levy, the plans for the cemetery were very grand with rolling hills, naturalistic plantings, pathways arranged in a spoke-and-circle pattern, an artificial lake and a large gatehouse. The gatehouse and lake were never realized. Behind the house is a receiving vault emblazoned with Knights of Pythias insignia and inscribed with a date of 1870.

The cemetery contains about 20,000 graves. The oldest grave is unknown, as there were many burials before the cemetery was chartered in 1869, and early records have been lost, but it is believed that it holds the remains of veterans of the Revolutionary War.

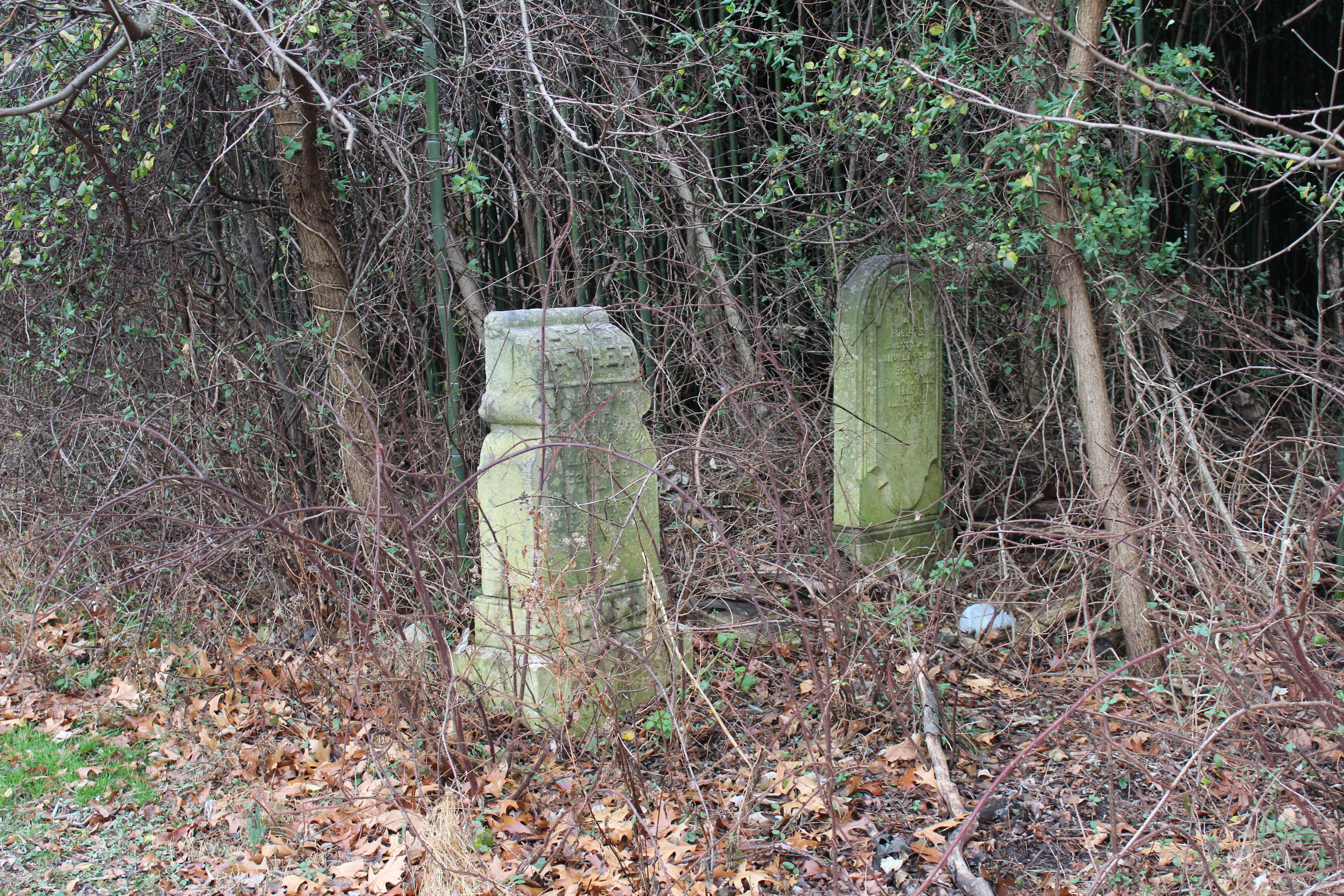
Cemetery clean-up progress has been made, but many gravestones remain in an overgrown, wooded section of the Cemetery

Over the years, the cemetery suffered from abandonment and vandalism. Millions of tons of industrial waste were dumped at the cemetery which buried some plots under 20 feet of debris. Many of the graves were damaged by vandalism, the cemetery became littered with abandoned cars and the rear of the cemetery became overgrown and reverted to woods. The Knights of Pythias attempted to have their name removed due to the poor condition of the cemetery but they were unsuccessful.

On August 9, 2000, Greenwood was listed by the Philadelphia Historical Commission on the Philadelphia Register of Historic Places.

In 2000, the cemetery came under the management of Willow Ridge Ltd., a private company. There was considerable local controversy over the company's plan to raze the historic home and build new structures, including a funeral parlor and crematorium. In 2000, Philadelphia's Zoning Board of Adjustment granted permission for the funeral parlor and crematorium. Several local residents sued in Philadelphia Common Pleas Court to overturn the Board's decision. The court upheld the decision of the Board, and the residents appealed to Pennsylvania Commonwealth Court. On February 8, 2007, Commonwealth Court overturned the decision of the trial court. The cemetery owners then appealed to the Pennsylvania Supreme Court, but their appeal was denied on October 18, 2007.

The Friends of Greenwood Cemetery, a nonprofit organization established in 2003, dedicated to preserving the records, tombstones, and grounds of the cemetery, made some progress in cleaning it up, mowing the lawns and clearing some of the woods.

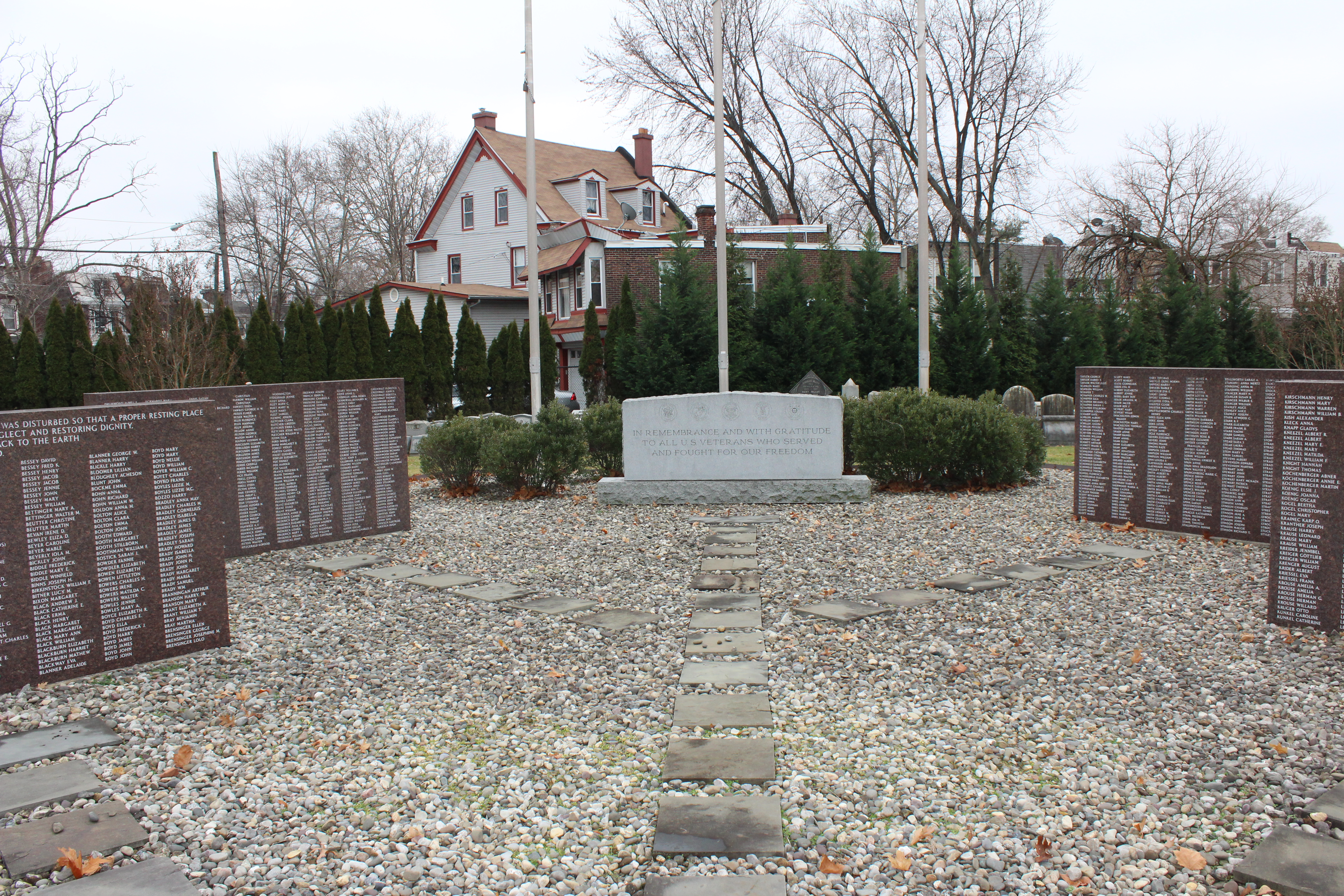
Veterans Memorial and memorial for the mass grave of 1,500 bodies moved for the Cancer Treatment Centers of America parking lot

In 2008, an adjacent hospital, Cancer Treatment Centers of America (CTCA) at Eastern Regional Medical Center, through their sister company Greenwood Holdings, paid $1.2 million for the nine acre property and acquired a majority share of the cemetery. Greenwood Holdings has begun revitalizing the cemetery. Headstones have been righted; abandoned cars and appliances have been removed. In addition, more than 1,500 graves were moved from a wooded section to allow for construction of a 200 space parking lot as part of CTCA's expansion. The cost of the reinterments totaled over $3 million. The bodies were reinterred in new concrete vaults and a new memorial was placed atop the mass grave. More than $1 million has been spent on renovations of the historic house including restoration of the windows, floors, fireplaces, roofs, ceilings and walls.

== Notable interments ==
- George Creamer (1855–1886), born George Triebel, an American Major League Baseball second baseman.
- James and Kate Dukenfield, the parents of W. C. Fields.
- Cpl. Thomas Francis Prendergast, USMC (April 2, 1871 – April 26, 1913), Medal of Honor recipient.
- Several children of Marie Noe, who initially attributed their deaths to natural causes but later pleaded guilty to their murders.
