= Victor Buckley =

Victor Buckley (1838-1882) was a British Foreign Office official, suspected of being an agent for the Confederate cause during the American Civil War.

== Family background ==
He was born at Minstead Lodge in the New Forest on 28 April 1838 - the fifth and youngest son of Captain (later General) Edward Pery Buckley. The General, a Waterloo veteran, was for over twenty years an equerry to Queen Victoria, and appears in her early diary entries. The Queen was Buckley's godmother - the first child to receive this honour after her accession. His grandfather, Lord Radnor, had been a leader of the Radical Whigs at the beginning of the century. Buckley was brought up at New Hall, Bodenham, Wiltshire, which his father inherited from a cousin a few years after he was born.

== Entry into the Foreign Office ==
In December 1856, after leaving Eton, Buckley took the examination before the Civil Service Commissioners, and on 12 January 1857 was appointed Junior (4th Class) Clerk. He was the first of the clerks to be appointed under the new system whereby all prospective clerks were required to pass an examination. Buckley was assigned to the department that had responsibility for matters relating to the United States. The American Civil War broke out in the spring of 1861.

== The accusation ==
In 1911, Henry Brooks Adams, one of Charles Francis Adams's sons, delivered a paper to the Massachusetts Historical Society, titled The Seizure of the Laird Rams. He had acted as his father's unofficial private secretary during his term as the North's minister in London in 1861–68. His father had struggled to get the British government, as a neutral state, to recognise that the building of ships in British dockyards that would be used against the North was against the spirit, if not the letter, of the existing law. In July 1862, his father finally persuaded Lord Russell, the Foreign Secretary, to order the seizure of CSS Alabama, the most powerful warship ever built in British dockyards. However, as the telegram ordering its seizure was on its way, the ship escaped. Adams suspected that its crew had been warned. The Alabama went on to inflict enormous damage on Northern merchant shipping.

Brooks Adams quotes his father's diary for 22 December 1865, "Incidentally he (Mr Moran, Secretary of Legation) told me that he had been able to trace the source of the betrayal of the decision of the Government which prompted the sudden escape of the Alabama. He showed me what purported to be a copy of a short note signed by V. Buckley and addressed to Mr (Caleb) Huse, the rebel agent, warning him that what he called his “protegé” was in danger. This Victor Buckley is a young clerk in the Foreign Office".

C.F. Adams was the American representative at the arbitration commission in Geneva in 1871, when part of the American submission included the claim that 'the departure of the 290 - CSS Alabama - from Birkenhead was probably, it may be said certainly, hastened by the illicit receipt of the intelligence of the decision of the Government to detain her.' Buckley was not named in the submission, but it was clear who the source of the 'illicit receipt' was in Adams' mind. More than half the $15,500,000 that had to be paid by Britain to the US, in reparations related to the damage done by CSS Alabama.

== Later historians ==
Brooks Adams’ paper, with its accusation, was little noticed until the publication in 1925 of Great Britain and the American Civil War, by Ephraim D. Adams. In it he quoted C.F. Adams’ diary entry, as it was reported in H.B. Adams’ paper, and observed ‘The question of advance warning to Bulloch [the Confederate agent responsible for commissioning the ship] or the Lairds who built the Alabama was not one which was likely to be put forward officially'.

In 2004, The Alabama, British Neutrality, and the American Civil War by Frank J.Merli was published posthumously. In the book, Merli wanted to exonerate Lord Palmerston and Lord Russell from the charge of complicity in the Alabama’s escape. He wrote, ‘As he admitted in his memoir, Bulloch had sympathetic Englishmen who were willing to apprise him of governmental intentions. To date, their identities remain shrouded in mystery…. But before Queen Victoria's prime minister or foreign secretary is condemned for connivance in the 1862 escape of a Confederate cruiser, more convincing evidence than we now have is needed. As of the time that I write, no one has produced any solid evidence to support these allegations.'

== Renata Eley Long ==
In 2015, Mrs Renata Eley Long published In the Shadow of the Alabama: The British Foreign Office and the American Civil War. Mrs Long is an English scholar, who worked with Frank Merli. She looked more closely at the accusation against Victor Buckley and unearthed some of the 'solid evidence' that Merli was looking for. From this, she believes that C.F. Adams’ suspicions could have been well founded. It seems to her possible that Buckley was indeed a Confederate agent, that he had been since near the beginning of the war, and that he was paid for his work. She also believes that an aristocratic cloak – even a masonic cloak – was thrown over him, and that his betrayal was covered up by a still powerful aristocratic establishment who had no desire for one of their own to be exposed.

== Conclusion ==
Mrs Long found nothing to link Buckley's possible activity with the Foreign Office, let alone with Lord Russell or Lord Palmerston, which is why she suggests that Buckley was working on his own. There remains however the possibility that Buckley was working on behalf of the government - a possibility which, as E.D. Adams suggested, would be difficult to prove.

== Buckley's later career ==
At the time of the Alabama crisis, Buckley was a Junior Clerk (1st class) and he continued his rise through the various levels of seniority in the Foreign Office. In February 1872, he was promoted Acting Assistant Clerk. In June 1873, he was appointed to a Commission of Enquiry into Consular Establishments at the Ports of North Germany and the Baltic. The various F.O.postings needed reorganisation after the defeat of Austria in 1866 and the move towards German unification under Prussian leadership. When he returned, he was confirmed in his position as Assistant Clerk. In December 1875, he was appointed Acting Secretary of Legation on Stephen Cave's Special Mission to Egypt. Cave was a barrister, Paymaster General in Disraeli's administration. The result of the report that Cave signed off on his return was the establishment of an Anglo-French oversight of the Egyptian government. As Acting Secretary of Legation, Buckley was the senior Foreign Office representative on the Mission.

Shortly before his early death in June 1882 of rheumatic fever, Buckley was appointed Senior Clerk and Head of the Consular Department at the Foreign Office - the youngest Head of department at that time.

== Personal life ==
Before the end of 1863, Buckley was engaged to Mary Stirling, eldest daughter of Admiral Sir James Stirling, founder and first governor of Western Australia. An uncle was William Stirling, whose firm, Stirling & Beckton, was one of the largest cotton manufacturing businesses in Manchester. It suffered badly during the war and Mary's cousin, Thomas Mayne Stirling, sold up in 1865. Thomas' mother and Mary's great-grandmother were both members of the prominent Willing family of Philadelphia, in the U.S.A. Victor and Mary were married in London in 1866 and had four children.

Kathleen Mary, Mother Magdalen of Jesus, b. 1867, entered the Carmelite Community in Notting Hill in 1896, and in 1907 became the founding prioress of the community in Liverpool. She died there in 1951.

Wilfred Stirling, b. 1868, was interned in the Ruhleben Camp in Germany in 1914. He was repatriated in 1917, having suffered a breakdown, and spent the rest of his life at New Saughton Hall (Mavisbank House), near Loanhead, Midlothian. He died in 1944.

Dorothy Mildmay, b. 1869, m. 1892 Ernest Raleigh King, of Chadshunt, Warwickshire and died of meningitis in 1915 while nursing at an officers' hospital in Winchester, leaving an only son.

Basil Thorold, Brig.Gen., C.B., C.M.G., C.V.O., Northumberland Fusiliers, b. 1874, m. 1904, Emmeline Edwards and d. in 1954, leaving an only son. He was a member of the Honourable Corps of Gentlemen at Arms and its Standard Bearer in 1942–44. He was also one of the founders of British Military Intelligence in Section C of MO2. In 1916, he was appointed head of MI2, which was responsible for intelligence concerning Germany and Austria-Hungary. In early 1918, he was appointed head of Middle Eastern Intelligence.
