= Duncombe Buckley =

English cricketer and British Army officer

Personal information
- Full name: Duncombe Frederick Buckley
- Born: 14 July 1831; Bodenham, Wiltshire, England
- Died: 6 September 1855 (aged 24); Sevastopol, Russian Empire
- Batting: Unknown
- Relatives: Alfred Buckley (brother); Cyril Buckley (great-nephew)

Domestic team information
- Years: Team
- 1851–1852: Marylebone Cricket Club

Career statistics
Competition	First-class
Matches	2
Runs scored	9
Batting average	3.00
100s/50s	–/–
Top score	4
Catches/stumpings	–/–
- Source: Cricinfo, 17 April 2021

Duncombe Frederick Buckley (14 July 1831 – 6 September 1855) was an English first-class cricketer and British Army officer.

The son of the politician Edward Pery Buckley, he was born in October 1829 at the family home New Hall at Bodenham, Wiltshire. He was educated at Eton College. Buckley played first-class cricket for the Marylebone Cricket Club on two occasions, playing against Cambridge University on both occasions at Fenner's and Lord's in 1851 and 1852, respectively, though without success as he scored just 9 runs across his two matches. He played alongside his brother, Alfred, in both matches. Buckley served in the British Army during the Crimean War, purchasing the ranks of lieutenant and captain in Royal Scots Fusiliers in October 1853. He was severely wounded at the Battle of the Alma in September 1854, but later returned to his regiment. Buckley was killed in action the following September while posting sentries in the trenches at the Siege of Sevastopol.
