= Philipp Blom =

German historian, novelist, journalist and translator

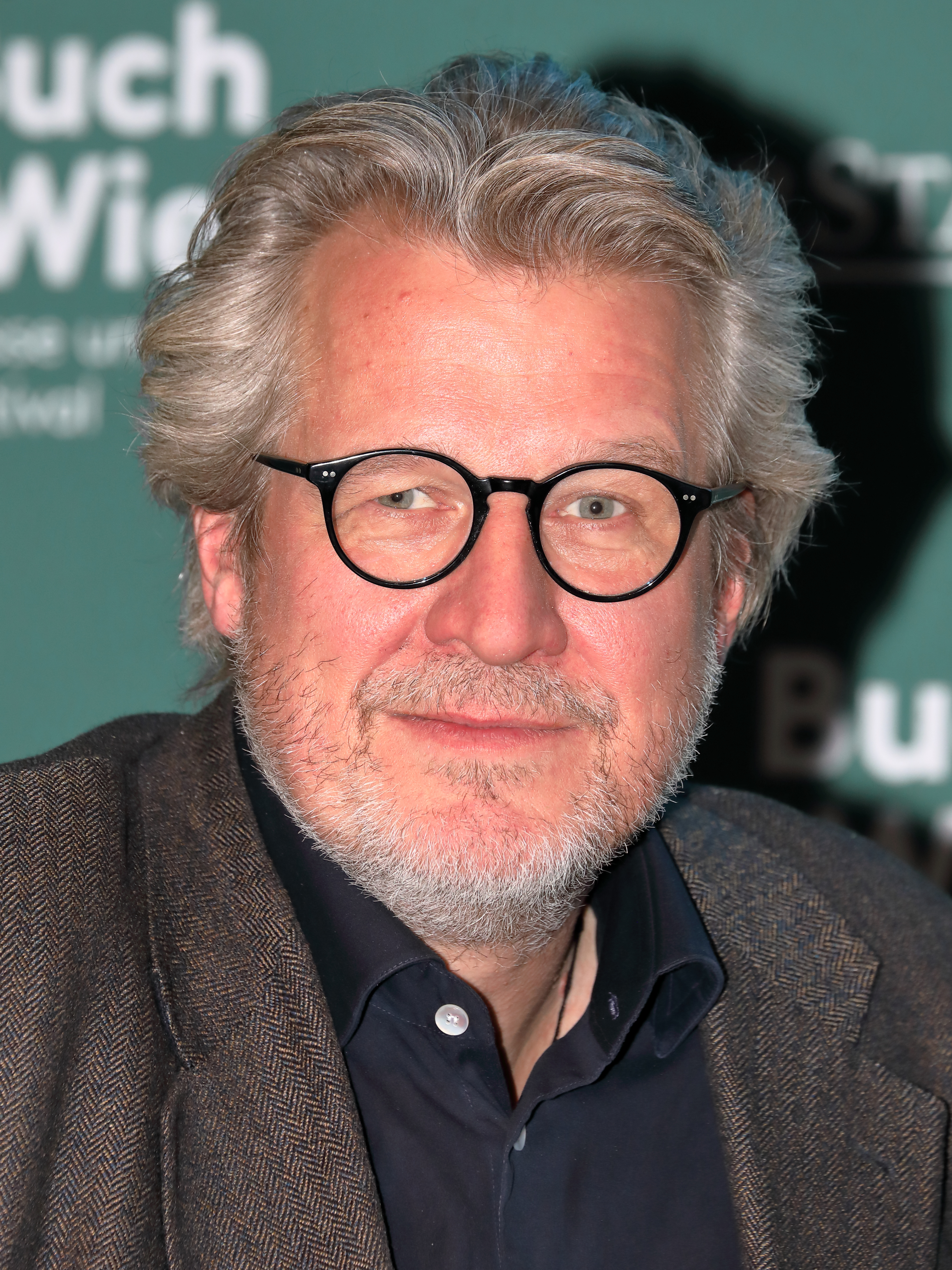
Blom in 2024

Philipp Blom (born 1970) is a German historian, novelist, journalist and translator.

== Biography ==
Blom was born in Hamburg, Germany, grew up in Detmold, and studied in Vienna and Oxford. He holds a DPhil in Modern History from Oxford University. After living and working in London, Paris and Vienna he now lives in Vienna with his wife Veronica Buckley.

His historical works include To Have and To Hold, a history of collectors and collecting, and Encyclopédie (US edition: Enlightening the World), a history of the Encyclopaedia by Diderot and d'Alembert that sparked the Enlightenment in France. In The Vertigo Years, Blom argues that the break with the past that is often associated with the trauma of World War I actually had its roots in the years before the war from 1900–1914. Blom followed this with Fracture: Life and Culture in the West, 1918–1938, a cultural history of the interwar years.

Blom has published two novels: The Simmons Papers and Luxor (in German).

He has also published a guide to Austrian wines, The Wines of Austria, and an English translation of Geert Mak's Amsterdam (1999) (Blom has a Dutch mother and speaks the language as well).

As a journalist, Blom has written for the Times Literary Supplement, The Financial Times, The Independent, The Guardian, and the Sunday Telegraph in Britain, for various German-language publications (Neue Zürcher Zeitung, Frankfurter Allgemeine Zeitung, Die Zeit, Süddeutsche Zeitung, Financial Times Deutschland, Berliner Zeitung, Der Standard, Die Tageszeitung), and for Vrij Nederland in the Netherlands, as well as for other magazines and journals, the BBC, and German radio stations. He had hosts a live cultural programme, "Von Tag zu Tag" and it´s successor "Punkt eins" on national radio station Ö1 on Austrian Public Radio (ORF).

2011 Blom has written the libretto for an opera, Soliman, a project with the composer Joost van Kerkhooven, and has provided translations for stage productions (The Producers for the Établissement Ronacher, and La Colombe for the Schönbrunn Theatre, Vienna).

== Works ==
In English

- Blom, Philipp (1995). The Simmons papers. London: Faber and Faber. ISBN 0-571-17315-2. OCLC 60042278.
- Blom, Philipp (2000). The wines of Austria. London: Faber and Faber. ISBN 0-571-19533-4. OCLC 59452635.
- Blom, Philipp (2003). To have and to hold : an intimate history of collectors and collecting. Woodstock, NY: Overlook Press. ISBN 1-58567-377-3. OCLC 50480178.
- Blom, Philipp (2005). Enlightening the world : Encyclopédie, the book that changed the course of history. New York: Palgrave Macmillan. ISBN 1-4039-6895-0. OCLC 57669780.
- Blom, Philipp (2008). The vertigo years : Europe, 1900-1914. New York: Basic Books. ISBN 978-0-465-01116-2. OCLC 262616681.
- Blom, Philipp (2010). A wicked company : the forgotten radicalism of the European Enlightenment. New York: Basic Books. ISBN 978-0-465-02278-6. OCLC 701109126.
- Blom, Philipp (2015). Fracture : life & culture in the West, 1918-1938. New York. ISBN 978-0-465-02249-6. OCLC 884814402.
- Blom, Philipp (2019). Nature's mutiny : how the little Ice Age of the long seventeenth century transformed the West and shaped the present. New York, NY. ISBN 978-1-63149-404-8. OCLC 1037807373.

In other languages

- Simmons, Paul E. H.; Blom, Philipp (1997). Die Simmons-Papiere (in German). Berlin. ISBN 978-3-8270-0234-1. OCLC 75930794.
- Blom, Philipp (2010). Une histoire intime des collectionneurs (in French). Paris: Payot. ISBN 978-2-228-90543-5. OCLC 685176034.
- Blom, Philipp (2009). Der taumelnde Kontinent : Europa 1900-1914 (in German). München: Hanser. ISBN 978-3-446-23292-1. OCLC 441177406.
- Blom, Philipp (2007). Encyclopédie : el triunfo de la razón en tiempos irracionales (in Spanish). Barcelona: Editorial Anagrama. ISBN 978-84-339-6254-6. OCLC 123941132.
- Blom, Philipp (2011). Böse Philosophen ein Salon in Paris und das vergessene Erbe der Aufklärung (in German). München. ISBN 978-3-446-23648-6. OCLC 707711126.
- Blom, Philipp (2005). Das vernünftige Ungeheuer Diderot, d'Alembert, de Jaucourt und die Große Enzyklopädie (in German). Frankfurt am Main. ISBN 978-3-8218-4553-1. OCLC 76546784.
- Blom, Philipp (2004). Sammelwunder, Sammelwahn : Szenen aus der Geschichte einer Leidenschaft (in German). Frankfurt am Main: Eichborn. ISBN 3-8218-4537-6. OCLC 66739374.
- Blom, Philipp (2006). Luxor (in German). Köln: Tisch 7. ISBN 3-938476-11-7. OCLC 70582735.
