= Howard Major Buckley =

- Born: January 23, 1863; Croton Falls, New York, U.S.
- Died: July 2, 1941 (aged 79); Bath, New York, U.S.
- Burial place: Wheeler Cemetery, Wheeler, New York, U.S.
- Military career
- Allegiance: United States
- Branch: United States Marine Corps
- Service years: 1896 - 1913
- Rank: Gunnery Sergeant
- Unit: Eighth Army Corps (temporary attachment)
- Conflicts: Philippine–American War
- Awards: Medal of Honor

Howard Major Buckley (January 23, 1863 – July 2, 1941), was a United States Marine private who received the Medal of Honor for actions during the Philippine–American War. He was one of three marines (along with Thomas Francis Prendergast and Joseph Leonard) attached to the Eighth Army Corps for the war. Buckley was awarded the medal for actions on March 25, 27, and 29 and April 4, 1899.

Buckley joined the Marine Corps from Brooklyn in July 1896, and received a bad conduct discharge in June 1913.

== Medal of Honor citation ==
Rank and organization: Private, U.S. Marine Corps. Born: January 23, 1868, Croton Falls, N.Y. Accredited to: New York. G.O. No.: 55, July 19, 1901.

Citation:

For distinguished conduct in the presence of the Enemy in battle while with the Eighth Army Corps on 25, 27, March 29, and April 4, 1899.

== See also ==
- List of Medal of Honor recipients
- List of Philippine–American War Medal of Honor recipients
