= Veronica Buckley =

British biographer

- Born: 1956 (age 69–70); Christchurch, New Zealand
- Education: University of Canterbury; University of London; Oxford University
- Occupation: Writer

Veronica Buckley (born 1956) is a writer and biographer. She was born in Christchurch, New Zealand. In 1979 she graduated from the University of Canterbury with first class honours in French with philosophy, and was awarded a postgraduate scholarship in cultural and social history at the University of London. Before embarking on her writing career she worked as a musician, and as a technical writer and information management specialist in the IT industry.

Following doctoral research in Modern History at Oxford University, Buckley wrote her first scholarly biography, about Queen Christina. Christina, Queen of Sweden: The Restless Life of a European Eccentric, was published in 2004, and translated into eight languages. It was rated one of the 20 best non-fiction books of the year by The Telegraph.

Buckley's second book, Madame de Maintenon: The Secret Wife of Louis XIV, was published by Bloomsbury in July 2008. It is a biography of Françoise d'Aubigné, Marquise de Maintenon, who rose from the humblest of beginnings to become the morganatic wife of the Sun King, and highly influential at his Court. In April 2008, the first edition was recalled and reprinted because of erroneous references to a literary work. A press article in The Guardian "exposed" the error, despite the fact that it had already been corrected. The book went on to win a broadly positive critical reception though Buckley was criticised by some reviewers for her interpretation of her subject's religious views.

Buckley lived in Paris and Vienna, but currently lives in Los Angeles. She is married to the writer Philipp Blom.

== Publications and editions ==
- Buckley, Veronica. Christina, Queen of Sweden: The Restless Life of a European Eccentric. Fourth Estate, London, 2004
- Buckley, Veronica. Christina, Queen of Sweden. Harper Perennial, London, 2005. ISBN 1-84115-736-8 pbk
- Buckley, Veronica. Madame de Maintenon: The Secret Wife of Louis XIV. Bloomsbury, London, 2008. ISBN 978-0-7475-8098-0 hbk
- Buckley, Veronica. The Secret Wife of Louis XIV: Françoise d’Aubigné, Madame de Maintenon, Farrar, Straus & Giroux, New York, 2009

As contributor

- Leo Hollis, (Ed.), Historic Paris Walks, Cardogan, London, 2006
- Rainer Wieland (Ed.), Frauen schön und stark: Frauen von heute über die Schönen der Kunst, Knesebeck, Munich, 2009 (in German)
- Philipp Blom and Veronica Buckley Die Welt von Gestern: Berlin, Brandstätter, Vienna, 2011
- Philipp Blom (Ed.), Angelo Soliman - Ein Afrikaner in Wien, exhibition catalogue, Brandstätter, Vienna, 2011 (in German)

== Reviews and external links ==
- Review of Christina, Queen of Sweden, The Sunday Times 11 April 2004
- Review of Christina, Queen of Sweden, Frances Wilson, The Guardian 10 April 2004
- Review of Christina, Queen of Sweden, Harriet Lane, The Observer 2 May 2004
- Review of Madame de Maintenon, The Economist, 24 July 2008
- Review of Madame de Maintenon, Professor Munro Price, The Telegraph. 3 August 2008
- Veronica Buckley's website
