= Quayshawne Buckley =

American football player (born 1991)

Profile
- Position: Defensive tackle

Personal information
- Born: August 25, 1991 (age 35); Jackson, Mississippi
- Listed height: 6 ft 3 in (1.91 m)
- Listed weight: 305 lb (138 kg)

Career information
- College: Idaho
- NFL draft: 2015: undrafted

Career history
- Tampa Bay Buccaneers (2015); Calgary Stampeders (2016)*
- * Offseason or practice squad member only

Quayshawne Buckley (born August 25, 1991) is an American football defensive tackle who is currently a free agent. He played college football at Idaho.

== Tampa Bay Buccaneers ==
Buckley was signed as an undrafted rookie on May 5, 2015.

== Calgary Stampeders ==
Buckley was released on June 13, 2016.
