= Owen Buckley =

English rugby league footballer

Personal information
- Born: 15 November 1998 (age 27) Runcorn, Cheshire, England
- Height: 6 ft 4 in (1.92 m)
- Weight: 14 st 7 lb (92 kg)

Playing information
- Position: Wing
Club
Years	Team	Pld	T	G	FG	P
2018–21	Widnes Vikings	20	11	0	0	44
2018(loan)	→ N Wales Crusaders	1	1	0	0	4
2021(loan)	→Swinton Lions	4	1	0	0	4
	Total	25	13	0	0	52
- Source: As of 28 October 2022

Owen Buckley (born 15 November 1998) is an English professional rugby league footballer who last played as a winger for Widnes Vikings in the Championship.

== Background ==
A former pupil at Sts Peter and Paul RC High School Owen played his junior rugby with local clubs West Bank Bears and Halton Farnworth Hornets before joining the Vikings’ Scholarship programme at the age of 15.

== Playing career ==
=== Widnes Vikings ===
He made his début for Widnes against Hull F.C. in 2018, scoring a try on his debut.

=== Swinton Lions (loan) ===
On 8 Jul 2021 it was reported that he had signed for Swinton Lions in the RFL Championship on a short-term 2-week loan, which was then later extended to a rolling week-by-week agreement
