= Arabella Buckley =

English writer and science educator

- Born: October 24, 1840; Brighton, England
- Died: February 9, 1929 (aged 88); Sidmouth, Devon
- Occupations: Writer, science educator, assistant to Charles Lyell
- Notable work: The Fairyland of Science (1879), A History of England for Beginners (1887), Life and Her Children (1880), Moral Teachings of Science (1892)
- Spouse: Charles Fisher (1884–1929)

Arabella Burton Buckley (24 October 1840 – 9 February 1929) was an English writer and science educator. She championed Darwinian evolution with particular emphasis on the mind and morals, in contrast to the prevailing emphasis on competition and physical survival. Charles Darwin described her as being able to "treat evolution with much dexterity and truthfulness".

== Biography ==
Buckley was born in Brighton, England. Her brother was Henry Buckley, 1st Baron Wrenbury. At the age of 24, she went to work as secretary to Charles Lyell, and remained with him until his death in 1875, on which Charles Darwin wrote to her to commiserate with her. After that, she began lecturing and writing on science.

Being Charles Lyell's assistant and a woman put her in good standing to educate youth. One of Buckley's earlier pieces, The Fairy-Land of Science, puts her views of science in a children's book setting, much like a mother educating her child. Her work was labelled as lectures rather than chapters, mirroring how she would teach young people. One of her lectures, "The Two Great Sculptors – Water and Ice" emphasizes how water and ice create hills, crevasses and valleys much as a sculptor will create a statue using a chisel. It also describes how water always needs somewhere to go and often takes part of the land with it, causing cliffs to fall apart leaving faults and intrusions behind. She saw no contradiction in using fancy to present fact, writing of the natural world: "Can any magic tale be more marvellous, or any thought grander, or more sublime than this?"

Buckley married Charles Fisher in early 1884 at the age of 44, but continued publishing under her maiden name. Although, one of the later editions of Eyes and No Eyes gives her married name (Mrs Fisher). She also edited two other publications: Mary Somerville's Connexion of the Physical Sciences (1877) and Heinrich Leutemann's Animals from Life (1887). Her books were translated into Japanese, Polish and Swedish in her lifetime.

In Buckley's time, male scientists often had female assistants and included some of their findings in the lead scientists' work. The women themselves generally would not be labelled scientists, and so did not receive any acknowledgement.

Arabella Buckley died of influenza at her home, 3 Boburg Terrace, Sidmouth, Devon, on 9 February 1929.

== Writing ==
Arabella Buckley's writing was predominantly aimed at children and young people, but was popular and greatly respected by all ages. She communicated science through enchantment and metaphorical language that was attractive to younger readers. Like many writers in her time, she was trying to distance science from the mechanistic and materialistic philosophies it was sometimes connected to, and promoted it in moralistic terms: learning is presented as a means to become not only knowledgeable, but morally good. This places it in the tradition of books such as Charles Kingsley's Glaucus or the Wonders of the Shore (1855) which ignited the Victorian craze for the popular pursuit of the natural world, seen in a framework of what has been called Muscular Christianity. Buckley was known for her theistic perspective on morality in nature. In her 1883 work, Winners in Life's Race, she argued that morality was "not a special gift to human beings, as Christians might like to believe, but a gradual development through the animal world."

However, Buckley veered away from this hyper-masculinised narrative of nature and science. She tended to avoid technical language, such as the mechanisms of natural selection, and instead use narrative and metaphor to reach a more inclusive, wider audience, than ever before witnessed in the field. This made her work "barrier-crossing", as it became accessible to children, professionals in sciences and spiritualists alike.

== Works ==
- A short history of natural science and of the progress of discovery from the time of the Greeks to the present day. For the use of schools and young persons (1876)
- Botanical Tables for the use of Junior Students (1877)
- The Fairy-Land of Science (1879)
- Life and Her Children (1880) with illustrations by John James Wild
- Winners in Life's Race or the Great Backboned Family (1883)
- History of England for Beginners (1887)
- Through magic glasses and other lectures : a sequel to The fairyland of science (1890)
- High School History of England (1891) co-authored by W.J. Robertson.
- Moral Teachings of Science (1892)
- Insect Life (1901)
- Birds of the Air (1901)
- By Pond and River (1901)
- Wild Life in Woods and Field (1901)
- Trees and Shrubs (1901)
- Plant Life in Field and Garden (1901)
- Eyes and No Eyes (1903)
