= Bill Buckley (Australian rules footballer) =

Australian rules footballer

Personal information
- Full name: William Leonard Buckley
- Born: 6 April 1896; Foster, Victoria
- Died: 3 May 1946 (aged 50); Yarram, Victoria
- Original team: Buffalo
- Height: 183 cm (6 ft 0 in)
- Weight: 81 kg (179 lb)

Playing career^{1}
Years	Club	Games (Goals)
1924	Collingwood	2 (0)
- ^{1} Playing statistics correct to the end of 1924.

William Leonard Buckley (6 April 1896 – 3 May 1946) was an Australian rules footballer who played with Collingwood in the Victorian Football League (VFL).
