= Alfred Buckley =

English cricketer

Personal information
- Full name: Alfred Buckley
- Born: 13 October 1829; Bodenham, Wiltshire, England
- Died: 15 December 1900 (aged 71); Bodenham, Wiltshire, England
- Batting: Unknown
- Relatives: Duncombe Buckley (brother); Cyril Buckley (great-nephew)

Domestic team information
- Years: Team
- 1851–1852: Marylebone Cricket Club

Career statistics
Competition	First-class
Matches	2
Runs scored	11
Batting average	3.66
100s/50s	–/–
Top score	6
Catches/stumpings	–/–
- Source: Cricinfo, 17 April 2021

Alfred Buckley DL JP (13 October 1829 – 15 December 1900) was an English first-class cricketer.

The son of the politician Edward Pery Buckley, he was born in October 1829 at the family home New Hall at Bodenham, Wiltshire. He was educated at Eton College, before going to Trinity College, Cambridge. Buckley played first-class cricket for the Marylebone Cricket Club on two occasions, playing against Cambridge University on both occasions at Fenner's and Lord's in 1851 and 1852 respectively, though without success as he scored just 11 runs across his two matches. He played alongside his brother, Duncombe, in both matches. He was appointed a deputy lieutenant for Wiltshire in April 1867. Buckley was employed in The Admiralty and served as the secretary to the Duke of Somerset. Other positions included his roles as chairman of the Salisbury Infirmary for 13 years and chairman of the Wilts and Dorset Banking Company from 1888. He was also a justice of the peace for Wiltshire. Buckley died at New Hall in December 1900, following a serious illness which had afflicted him for three months prior. He was survived by his wife.
