= Carmel Buckley =

British artist

- Born: 1956 (age 69–70)

Carmel Buckley (born 1956) is a British artist.

Her work is included in collections of the Museum of Fine Arts Houston and the National Gallery of Art, Washington.
