= Henry Buckley, 1st Baron Wrenbury =

British barrister and judge

The Right Honourable The Lord Wrenbury PC
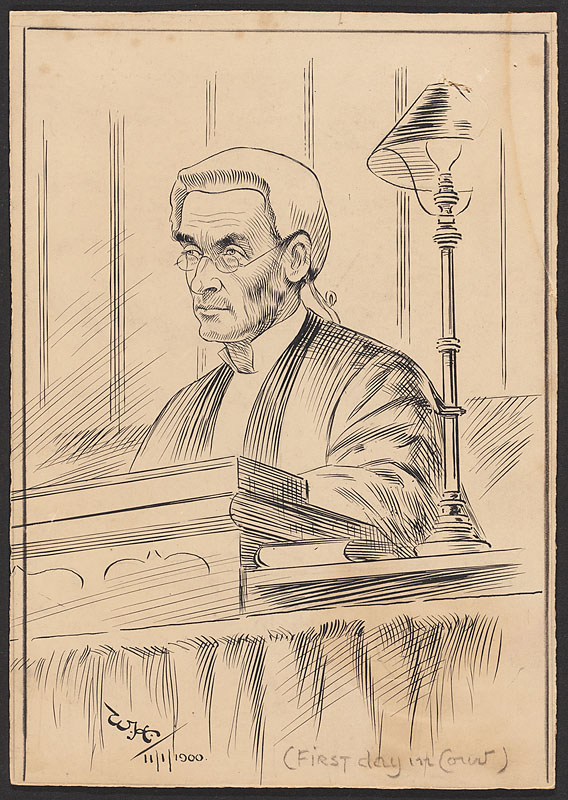
- Mr Justice Buckley in 1900

Lord Justice of Appeal
- In office 24 October 1906 – 7 April 1915
- Preceded by: Sir Robert Romer

Justice of the High Court
- In office 10 January 1900 – 24 October 1906
- Succeeded by: Sir Robert Parker

Personal details
- Born: Henry Burton Buckley; 15 September 1845 London, England
- Died: 27 October 1935 (aged 90) London
- Spouse: Bertha Margaretta Jones (m. 1887)
- Children: 8
- Education: Christ's College, Cambridge

Henry Burton Buckley, 1st Baron Wrenbury, PC (15 September 1845 – 27 October 1935), was a British barrister and judge.

== Career ==
Buckley was the fourth son of Reverend John Wall Buckley and his wife Elizabeth Burton, daughter of Thomas Burton; his elder sister Arabella was a writer and science educator. He was educated at Merchant Taylors' School and at Christ's College, Cambridge. He was Tancred law student from 1866 to 1872.

Buckley was called to the bar at Lincoln's Inn in 1869, and became a Queen's Counsel in 1886. He was a member of the Bar Committee and of the Bar Council from 1882 to 1898. In January 1900 he was appointed a judge of the High Court of Justice of England and Wales, and he received the customary knighthood from Queen Victoria at Windsor Castle on 3 March 1900. He became a Lord Justice of Appeal and was admitted to the Privy Council in 1906, and on his retirement in 1915 he was raised to the peerage as Baron Wrenbury, of Old Castle in the County of East Sussex.

In May 1901 he was elected an Honorary Fellow of Christ's College, Cambridge.

== Family ==
Lord Wrenbury married Bertha Margaretta Jones (1866–1960), daughter of Charles Edward Jones, in 1887. They had four sons and four daughters:

- Hon. Joyce Burton Buckley (b. 1889)
- Hon. Bryan Burton Buckley, 2nd Baron Wrenbury (1890–1940), married Helen Malise Graham
- Guy Burton Buckley (b. 1892)
- Hon. Muriel Burton Buckley (1894–1976), married Bernard Warren Williams
- Hon. Olive Burton Buckley (b. 1896), married Stephen Romney Maurice Gill
- Hon. Ruth Burton Buckley (1898–1986)
- Hon. Colin Burton Buckley (1899–1981), married Evelyn Joyce Webster
- Hon. Sir Denys Burton Buckley (1906–1998), married Gwendolen Jane Armstrong-Jones

He died at his home in Melbury Road, London, in October 1935, aged 90, and was cremated at Golders Green Crematorium. He was succeeded in the barony by his eldest son Bryan Burton Buckley, 2nd Baron Wrenbury. His younger son Sir Denys Burton Buckley also became a judge of the High Court of Justice of England and Wales and a Lord Justice of Appeal.

== Arms ==
Coat of arms of Henry Buckley, 1st Baron Wrenbury
Crest On a mount Vert a demi-stag at gaze Gules attired and gorged with a collar a chain attached reflexed over the back Or supporting a garb of the last. Escutcheon Azure a chevron cottised between two stags' heads cabossed in chief and a garb in base all Or on a chief engrailed Ermine a buckle between two crosses pattée fitchée Gules. Supporters On either side a buck at gaze Gules collared attired and chained Or. Motto To My Utmost

== See also ==
- Mr Justice Buckley Company law (Vanity Fair 1900)
- Daimler Co Ltd v Continental Tyre and Rubber Co (Great Britain) Ltd [1915] 1 KB 893
- Wrenbury Committee (27 February 1918)

Peerage of the United Kingdom
New creation	Baron Wrenbury; 1915–1935	Succeeded by Bryan Burton Buckley
