= Bryan Burton Buckley, 2nd Baron Wrenbury =

British lawyer (1890–1940)

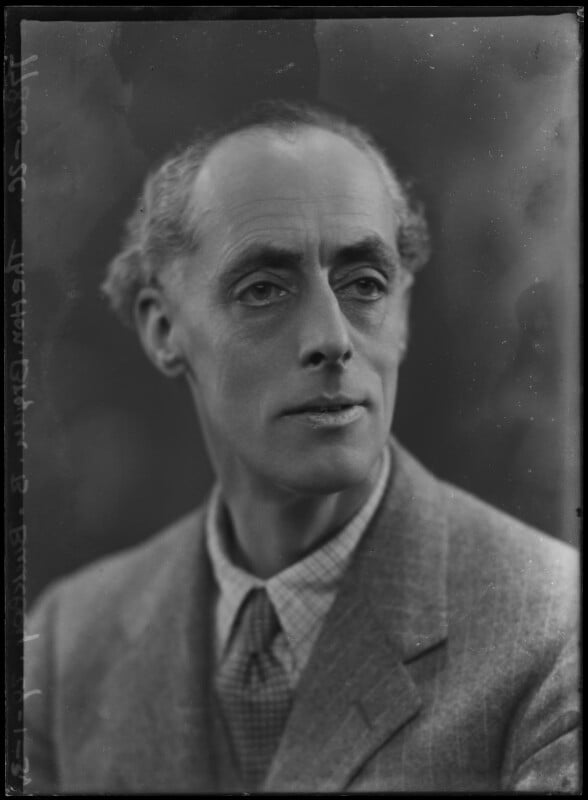
Buckley in 1934

Bryan Burton Buckley, 2nd Baron Wrenbury (24 May 1890 – 29 May 1940) was a British peer.

The son of Henry Buckley, 1st Baron Wrenbury he was born on 24 May 1890 and educated at Eton and King's College, Cambridge. He was called to the bar in 1913. During World War One he served with the London Regiment. In 1925 he married Helen Malise Graham; they had one son, his heir John Burton Buckley, and one daughter Mary Graham Buckley.

Peerage of the United Kingdom
Preceded by Henry Buckley	Baron Wrenbury; 1935–1940	Succeeded by John Burton Buckley
