= Ann Buckley (industrialist) =

Ann Buckley (1806-1872), was an English factory owner and industrialist.

She was married to John Buckley, founder of the clothing firm Cap Manufacturers and Clothiers in Leeds in Yorkshire in 1834. She took over the company when she was widowed in 1850 and was its managing director until her death. She included her sons Joshua and John as her partners in 1856 but maintained her active post as managing director of 'Ann Buckley and Sons'. Her business company belonged to the substantial ones in the major industrial city of Leeds during the Victorian industrial revolution and she was as such one of its significant figure, with hundreds in her employ. She left a fortune of £ 14,000.
