= Lauren B. Buckley =

American scientist

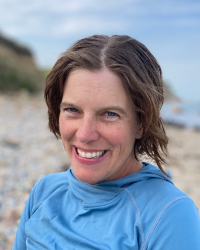
- Education: Williams College (BA); Stanford University (PhD)
- Scientific career
- Fields: Evolutionary ecology Climate change
- Workplaces: Santa Fe Institute; National Center for Ecological Analysis and Synthesis (NCEAS); University of North Carolina Chapel Hill; University of Washington
- Website: www.biology.washington.edu/people/profile/lauren-buckley/

Lauren B. Buckley is an evolutionary ecologist and professor of biology at the University of Washington. She researches the relationship between organismal physiological and life history features and response to global climate change.

== Early life and education ==
Lauren Buckley grew up on Conanicut Island, Rhode Island. She developed an early interest in biology while exploring her home island with her parents, both marine biologists.

Buckley earned her Bachelor of Arts in biology and mathematics (honors) at Williams College in 2000. She conducted research as a graduate student at Stanford University, where she earned her PhD in 2005. Following her time at Stanford, Buckley pursued postdoctoral fellowships at the National Center for Ecological Analysis and Synthesis (NCEAS) and the Santa Fe Institute. Buckley became an assistant professor at the University of North Carolina Chapel Hill, a position she held from 2009 to 2013. In 2013, she joined the faculty at the University of Washington Department of Biology, and has been a professor from 2019 onward. Her lab, Buckley Lab, is affiliated with the University of Washington, and conducts research on the adaptive and ecological responses of organisms to global climate change.

== Research ==
=== Climate change modeling ===
Buckley's work has focused on improving the modeling and forecasting of organismal responses to climate change by integrating field and experimental data. She has demonstrated that the most commonly used models in climate change research are insufficient predictors of species and population behavior, as they neglect essential features such as thermal physiology, behavior, size, and abiotic constraints, all of which factor into species fitness and performance. The mechanistic species distribution models she has developed incorporate essential aspects of species biology to improve predictions and assess the generalizability of certain phenotypes to other systems. Another central concern these modeling improvements seek to address is how much organisms will be able to move to adapt to changing climate patterns, and how this ability changes given an array of biotic and abiotic variables.

=== Ectotherm studies ===
Buckley has utilized a variety of systems to study the responses of ectotherms to climate and weather patterns. Beginning with her dissertation, Buckley’s early research focused heavily on insular lizard population dynamics. Through the study of island lizard populations, she has documented the impact of energy constraints as key limiting factors to the density, abundance, and community structure of ectotherm populations. She has also studied and described the importance of incorporating physiological and life history features into models when predicting the range constraints and shifts of species.

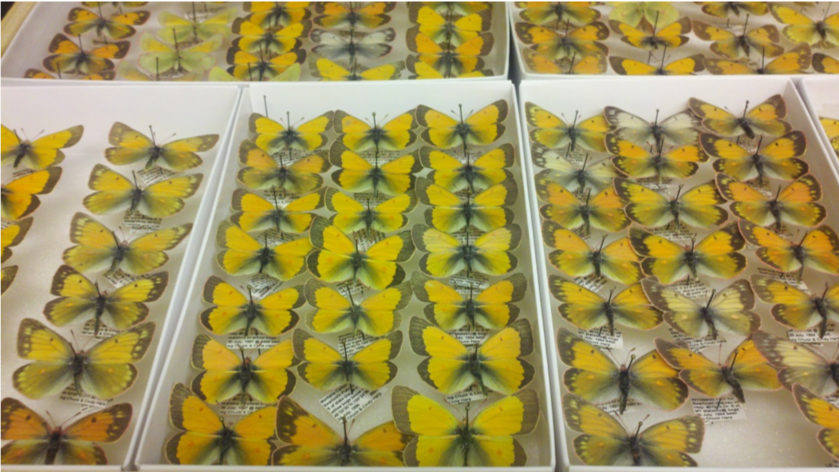
Museum specimens of Colias meadii reveal the effects of climate change through changes in pigmentation

Her more recent research has focused insect systems where historical data can be used to test predictions of responses to climate change. In particular, she focuses on the fitness implications of climate change for a species, given its biological and ecological features, which are often-overlooked components of climate change research. Her work has been instrumental in clarifying the performance and fitness consequences of thermal stress for ectotherm species, and brought attention to the particular vulnerability of mid-latitude species to climate change. Buckley has also analyzed the influence of a number of variables on a given species' ability to respond to climate change, especially thermal developmental plasticity. Further, she has drawn important connections between developmental plasticity and maladaptive phenological shifts that may reduce fitness and disrupt ecological interactions, as well as the role of plasticity in attenuating climate change impacts. Her primary insect study systems are Colias butterflies and grasshopper communities in Colorado.

=== Teaching ===
Buckley teaches undergraduate biology courses at the University of Washington, including BIOL 315: Biological Impacts of Climate Change and BIOL 421: Ecological and Evolutionary Physiology of Animals. Her classes align with her research, emphasizing the interactions between biology and climate change.

== Public outreach and TrEnCh Project ==
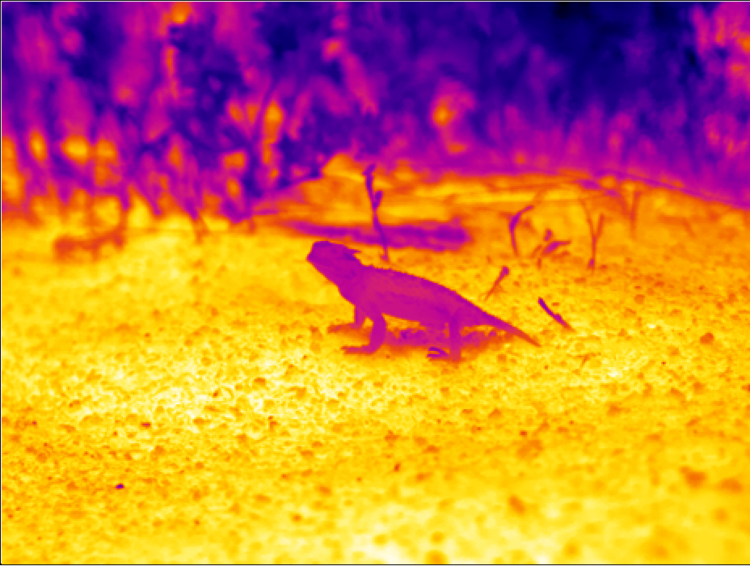
IR imaging is one of the tools used by the TrEnCh project

Buckley received an NSF CAREER grant to pursue the development of the Translating Environmental Change (TrEnCh) project. The goal of the TrEnCh project is to develop tools for visualizing the impact and response of environmental and climate change on organisms. It offers open-source, high-resolution data for sophisticated modeling and forecasting with greater detail and accuracy than traditional models that use general parameters. The project integrates a variety of open-source historical and observational data to promote dissemination of the material, and to connect the public to accessible means of understanding climate effects. One of the tools available through the project is TrenchR, a package for organismal energy modeling using the R programming language. The TrEnCh project also uses infrared imaging to better collect data on the thermal conditions of ectotherms, and elucidate the possible resulting climate change impacts on thermally-sensitive processes.

The TrEnCh-ed portion of the project is designed to allow students to interact with data and observe climate-related correlations in organismal responses.

== Honors and awards ==
Year	Award Title
2021	The Reuters Hot List (top 1000 most influential climate scientists)
2021	Expertscape World Expert in Climatic Processes
2021	Clarivate Highly Cited Researcher in Environment and Ecology
2014–2019	NSF CAREER awardee
2015	Future leader, Science and Technology in Society (STS) Forum
2011, 2013	National Academy of Sciences Kavli Frontiers of Science Fellow
2005–2007	Santa Fe Institute Omidyar Postdoctoral Fellowship

== Select publications ==
- Buckley, L. B., Cannistra, A. F., & John, A. (2018). Leveraging organismal biology to forecast the effects of climate change. Integrative and comparative biology, 58(1), 38–51.
- Buckley, L. B., & Kingsolver, J. G. (2012). Functional and phylogenetic approaches to forecasting species' responses to climate change. Annual Review of Ecology, Evolution, and Systematics, 43, 205–226.
- Burrows, M. T., Schoeman, D. S., Buckley, L. B., Moore, P., Poloczanska, E. S., Brander, K. M., ... & Richardson, A. J. (2011). The pace of shifting climate in marine and terrestrial ecosystems. Science, 334(6056), 652–655.
- Buckley, L. B., Urban, M. C., Angilletta, M. J., Crozier, L. G., Rissler, L. J., & Sears, M. W. (2010). Can mechanism inform species’ distribution models?. Ecology letters, 13(8), 1041–1054.
- Buckley, L. B., & Jetz, W. (2008). Linking global turnover of species and environments. Proceedings of the National Academy of Sciences, 105(46), 17836–17841.
