= Ed Buckley =

Australian rules footballer

Personal information
- Full name: Edward Parnell Buckley
- Born: 9 February 1889; Balnarring, Victoria
- Died: 20 October 1932 (aged 43); Fitzroy, Victoria
- Original team: Brighton

Playing career^{1}
| Years | Club | Games (Goals) |
| 1915 | Melbourne | 3 (0) |
- ^{1} Playing statistics correct to the end of 1915.

Edward Parnell Buckley (9 February 1889 – 20 October 1932) was an Australian rules footballer who played with Melbourne in the Victorian Football League (VFL).
