= Conanicut Island =

Island in Rhode Island, US

Coordinates: 41°31′00″N 71°23′00″W

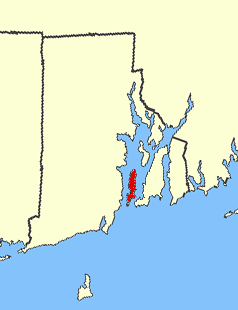
Conanicut Island

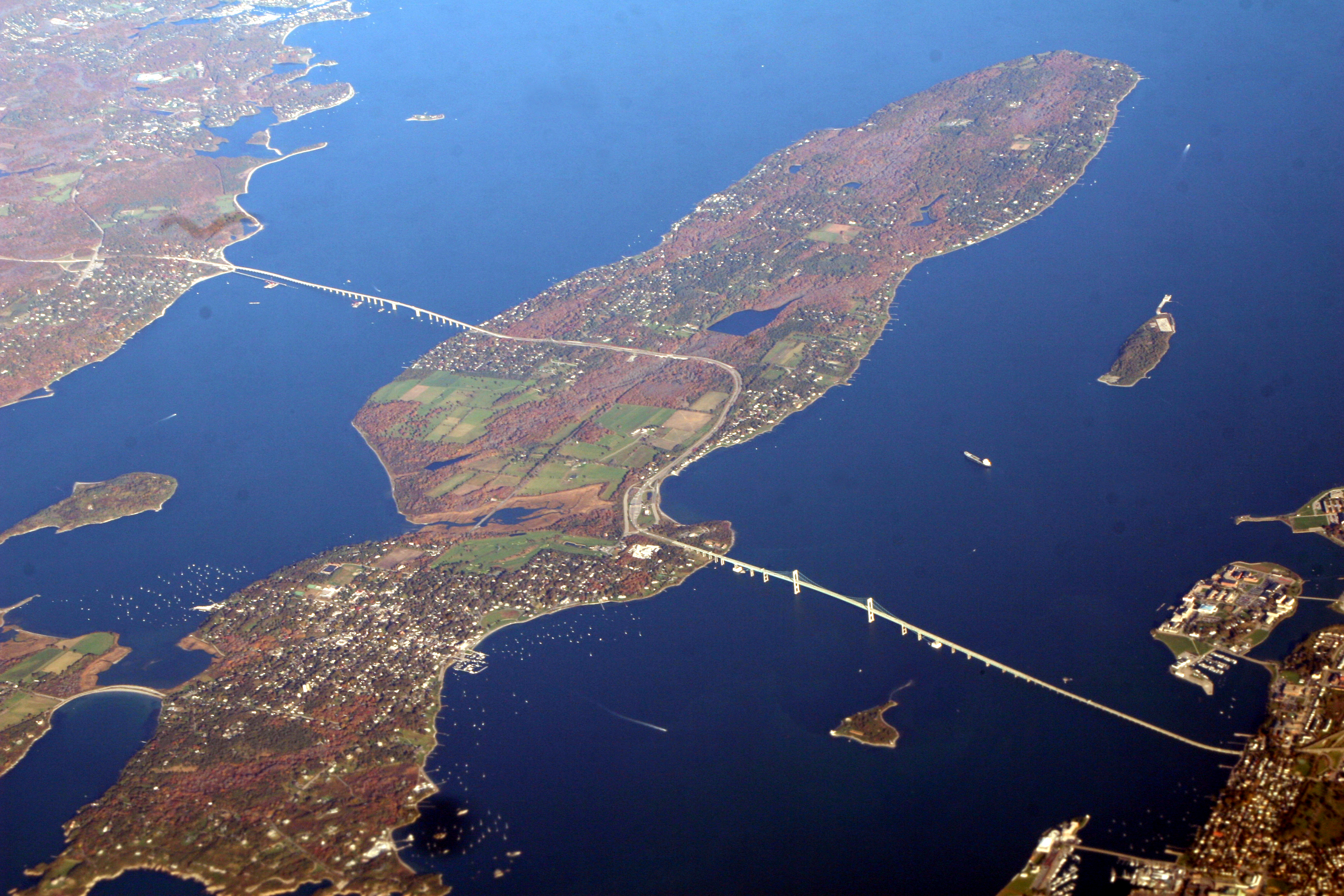
Conanicut Island from the south

Conanicut Island (/kəˈnænəkʌt/ kə-NAN-ə-kut) is an island in Narragansett Bay in the American state of Rhode Island. The second-largest in the Bay, it is connected on the east to Newport on Aquidneck Island by the Claiborne Pell Bridge, commonly known as the Newport Bridge, and on the west to North Kingstown on the mainland via the Jamestown-Verrazano Bridge. The town of Jamestown comprises the entire island. The U.S. Census Bureau reported a land area of 24.46 km^{2} (9.44 sq mi) and a population of 5,622 in 2000. A tombolo connects the southern part of Conanicut to an extension of the island to the southwest.

== History ==
Conanicut Island was a seasonal home to the Narragansett tribe of American Indians. The largest Indian cemetery in New England is located on the island, and artifacts have been recovered from a site near the elementary school. The island is named for Chief Canonicus of the Narragansetts, who maintained his royal residence on the island.

In 1636 or 1637, Dutch fur traders paid to use the island of Quentenis (today’s Dutch Island, located just west of Conanicut) as a base for their activities. In 1638, the English colonists made arrangements to use Conanicut Island for grazing sheep, and Canonicus was one of the Narragansett sachems who gave consent. They referred to the island in his honor, and the Jamestown seal today includes the figure of a sheep. Conanicut Island was a part of the island territory included in a commission which the Council of State of England granted to William Coddington in 1651 separating them from the mainland and making him indefinite governor of the islands (later revoked).

In 1657, a consortium of about 100 buyers purchased Conanicut, Dutch, and Gould Islands. They divided Conanicut into roughly a dozen large plots and reserved Dutch Island and parts of Conanicut for common use. Benedict Arnold (great-grandfather of the Revolutionary War traitor, who became governor of the Colony of Rhode Island the same year) and William Case were among the purchasers.

The Indians and colonists lived side-by-side in relative peace for almost four decades. Conflicts eventually occurred in a number of places in southern New England, leading to what is known as King Philip's War. Life in the region was dominated by the colonists after 1676, although Conanicut Island remained a haven for many Indians.

In 1725, a ferry was established between the island and Newport. Another ferry was established to South Kingstown in 1748.

== Notable residents ==
- Daniel Fones
- Lauren Buckley
