= Joseph Leonard (soldier) =

Joseph H Leonard
- Born: August 28, 1876; Cohoes, New York, US
- Died: September 23, 1946 (aged 70); Yountville, California, US
- Burial place: Veterans Memorial Grove Cemetery, Yountville, California
- Military career
- Allegiance: United States of America
- Branch: United States Marine Corps
- Service years: 1897 - 1902, 1918 - 1919
- Rank: Sergeant
- Unit: Eighth Army Corps (temporary attachment)
- Conflicts: Philippine–American War
- Awards: Medal of Honor; World War I

Joseph H Leonard (August 28, 1876–September 23, 1946) was a United States Marine private received the Medal of Honor for actions during the Philippine–American War.

Leonard joined the Marine Corps from Brooklyn in June 1897, and was honorably discharged five years later. He later served during World War I from April 1918 to July 1919.

== Medal of Honor citation ==
Rank and organization: Private, U.S. Marine Corps. (Enlisted as Joseph Melvin). Born: August 28, 1876, Cohoes, N.Y. Accredited to: New York. G.O. No.: 55, July 19, 1901.

Citation:

For distinguished conduct in the presence of the enemy in battles, while with the Eighth Army Corps on 25, 27, and March 29, and on April 4, 1899.

== See also ==
- List of Medal of Honor recipients
