= Francis Buckley (archaeologist) =

Francis Buckley (1881-1948) was a British Army officer and archaeologist whose work helped in the development of Mesolithic studies. His work on collecting, recording and classifying findings, marked an early use of scientific techniques.

Many items from his wide collection were donated to Gallery Oldham between 1926 and 1948.

== Selected publications ==
- Buckley, F. (1919–22). Finds of Flint Implements in The Red Line Trenches At Coigneux, 1918. Proceedings of the Prehistoric Society of East Anglia 3: 380–388.
- Buckley, Francis. (1920). A microlithic industry: Marsden, Yorkshire. London: Spottiswoode, Ballantyne & Co.
- Buckley, Francis. (1920). Recollections of the Great War : three years on campaign in France and Flanders with the Northumberland Fusiliers - Reprinted (2015) By Pen & Sword Military
- Buckley, F. (1922). Yorkshire Gravers. Proceedings of the Prehistoric Society of East Anglia, 3(4), 542–547.
- Buckley, F. (1924). A Microlithic Industry of the Pennine Chain: Related to the Tardenoise of Belgium.
- Buckley, Francis. (1925). A History of old English glass. London: Benn.
- Buckley, Francis. (1926). Old London goldsmiths, 1666-1706. Uppermill: Moore and Edwards.
