= Michael J. Buckley =

American Jesuit priest and theologian (1931–2019)

The Reverend Michael J. Buckley SJ
- Born: Michael Joseph Buckley; October 12, 1931; San Francisco, California, US
- Died: July 25, 2019 (aged 87); Los Gatos, California, US

Ecclesiastical career
- Church: Latin Church
- Ordained: 1962

Academic background
- Education: Gonzaga University (BA, MA); Santa Clara University (STM); University of Chicago (PhD)
- Doctoral advisor: Richard McKeon

Academic work
- Discipline: Theology
- Sub-discipline: Philosophical theology
- Institutions: University of Notre Dame; Santa Clara University; Boston College

Michael Joseph Buckley SJ (October 12, 1931 – July 25, 2019) was an American Jesuit priest and philosophical theologian. He was the Bea Professor of Theology at Santa Clara University. He also served as president of the Catholic Theological Society of America.

Buckley was born on October 12, 1931, in San Francisco, California, the son of Eleanor (née Fletcher) and colonel Michael Buckley Jr. He graduated from Bellarmine College Preparatory.

He studied philosophy at Gonzaga University, receiving a BA and MA. He graduated from Santa Clara University with a Master of Sacred Theology and received a PhD in 1967 from the University of Chicago, studying under Richard McKeon. He received two honorary doctorates. He died on July 25, 2019, in Los Gatos, California.

== Publications ==
- Morality and the Homosexual, A Catholic Approach to a Moral Problem (Westminster, 1960).
- Motion and Motion's God: Thematic Variations in Aristotle, Cicero, Newton and Hegel (Princeton, 1971).
- At the Origins of Modern Atheism (Yale, 1987).
- Papal Primacy and the Episcopate: Towards a Relational Understanding (Herder, 1998).
- The Catholic University as Promise and Project (Georgetown, 1998).
- Denying and Disclosing God: The Ambiguous Progress of Modern Atheism (Yale, 2000).
- What Do You Seek? The Questions of Jesus as Challenge and Promise (Eerdmans, 2016).

== Activities ==
- President, Catholic Theological Society of America, 1991–1992
- Advisory Committee, Princeton Center of Theological Inquiry, 1999–2000
- Chair, Jesuit International Theological Commission
- Executive Director, Committees on Doctrine and Pastoral Research and Practices at the United States Conference of Catholic Bishops (USCCB)
- Consultant Board Member, Herder/Crossroad Press
- Member, Clare Hall, Cambridge University

Professional and academic associations
Preceded by Walter H. Principe	President of the Catholic Theological Society of America; 1991–1992	Succeeded by Lisa Sowle Cahill
