= Michael Buckley Jr. =

United States Army officer (1902–2006)

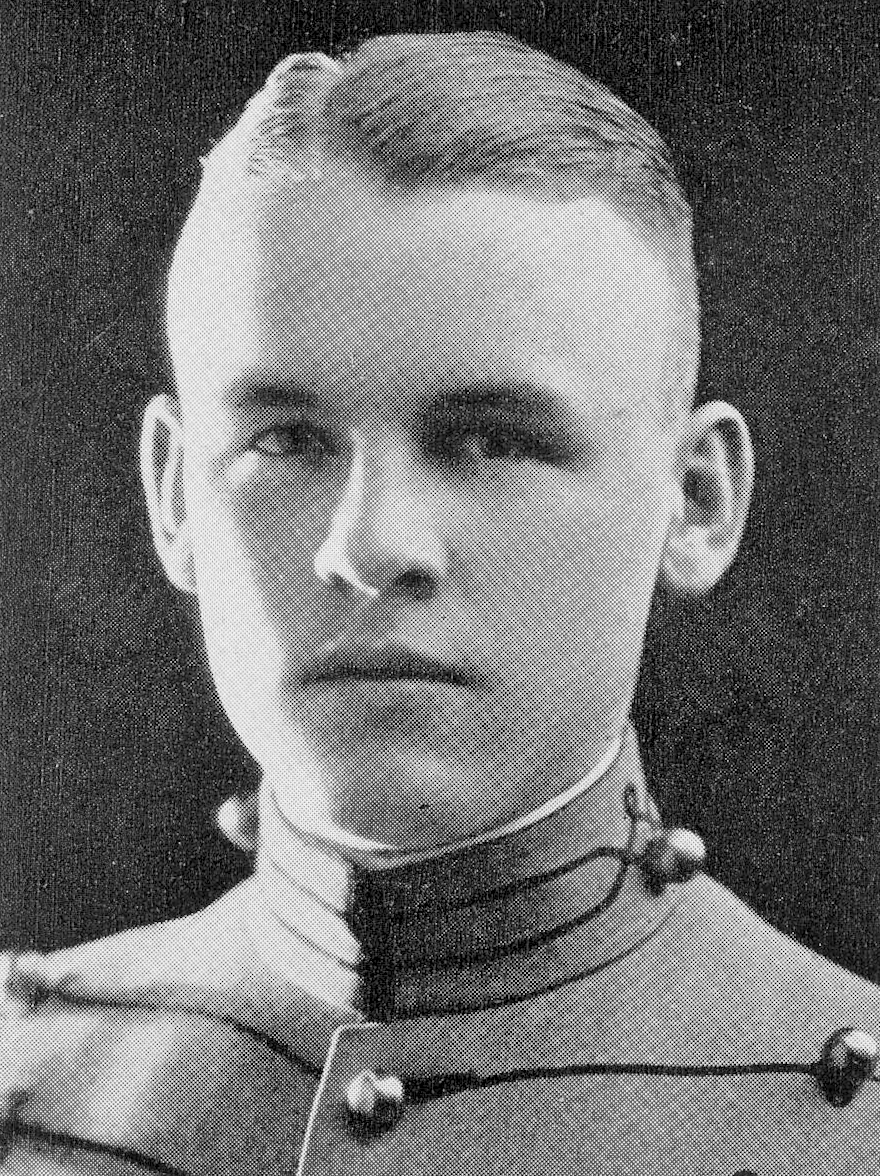
- At West Point in 1923
- Born: May 17, 1902; Bisbee, Arizona Territory
- Died: August 17, 2006 (aged 104); Oakland, California
- Education: United States Military Academy
- Occupation(s): Military officer, teacher
- Known for: First American prisoner of war during World War II

Colonel Michael Joseph Buckley Jr. (May 17, 1902 – August 17, 2006) was the first American prisoner of war during World War II when, as a major in the United States Army, he was captured near Tobruk on November 23, 1941 by German military forces under the command of Lieutenant-General Erwin Rommel, also known as "The Desert Fox." This was two weeks prior to the United States entering the war after the Japanese attack on Pearl Harbor on December 7, 1941.

== Early life and education ==
Buckley Jr. was born in Bisbee, then in Arizona Territory, on May 17, 1902, to Michael and Barbara Lally Buckley. He grew up in Coalinga, California where he attended Coalinga High School, graduating in 1919.

== Early military career ==
In 1919, Buckley Jr. attended the United States Military Academy at West Point, New York, graduating with the class of 1923 and receiving his commission in the Field Artillery Branch of the United States Army.

== Prisoner of war ==
In the fall of 1941, and while holding the rank of major, Buckley Jr. was sent to Egypt as an observer of the British forces fighting against the combined Italian and German armies under the command of Lieutenant-General Erwin Rommel.

On November 23, 1941, Buckley Jr. was with the 5th South African Brigade who were advancing on Tobruk when Rommel's panzer forces overran their position and he was captured.

As an unarmed non-combatant, Buckley Jr. should have been released, but after Pearl Harbor (that occurred two weeks after his capture) he was interned in Italy until freed by a prisoner exchange in May 1942, thus making him the first American soldier to be held as a prisoner of war during World War II.

== World War II and later military service ==
After being freed from German captivity, in May 1942, Buckley Jr. spent the remainder of World War II on the U.S. Army planning staff of General Lesley McNair in Washington, D.C., after which he then served in the Occupation of Japan.

In 1953, while holding the rank of colonel, Buckley Jr. became Professor of Military Science and Tactics for the ROTC program at Santa Clara University, California, and where he retired from his military service in 1954.

== Educational career, family, and death ==
After his retirement from the U.S. Army in 1954, Buckley Jr. taught mathematics at Santa Clara University until 1968. He and his wife, the former Eleanor Fletcher, moved to Santa Cruz in 1967, and lived there until her death in 1999 after 73 years of marriage.

Buckley Jr. had six children, only two of whom, including Michael J. Buckley, survived until his death in Oakland, California on August 17, 2006, at the age of 104. He was also the great-uncle of Tom Brady.

At the time of his death, Buckley Jr. was the oldest living graduate of West Point.
