= Edward Pery Buckley =

British politician

Member of Parliament for Salisbury
- In office 15 November 1853 – 13 July 1865 Serving with Matthew Henry Marsh (1857–1865); William Chaplin (1853–1857)
- Preceded by: William Chaplin; Charles Baring Wall
- Succeeded by: Matthew Henry Marsh; Edward Hamilton

Personal details
- Born: 7 November 1796
- Died: 28 May 1873 (aged 76)
- Party: Liberal
- Other political affiliations: Whig
- Spouse: Catherine Pleydell-Bouverie (m. 1828)
- Children: Six

Military service
- Allegiance: United Kingdom
- Branch/service: British Army
- Years of service: 1812–1830
- Rank: General
- Unit: 1st Foot Guards
- Battles/wars: Napoleonic Wars; Peninsular War; Battle of the Bidassoa; Battle of Nivelle; Battle of the Nive; Battle of Bayonne; Hundred Days; Battle of Quatre Bras; Battle of Waterloo

General Edward Pery Buckley (7 November 1796 – 28 May 1873) was a British Liberal and Whig politician.

== Personal life ==
Buckley was the son of his namesake, Edward Pery Buckley, and Lady Georgiana West. He married Lady Catherine Pleydell-Bouverie, daughter of William Pleydell-Bouverie, 3rd Earl of Radnor and Lady Catherine Pelham-Clinton, in 1828, and together they had six children: Frances Gertrude (died 1921); Alfred (1829–1900); Edward William (1829–1840); Duncombe Frederick (1831–1855); Felix John (1834–1911); and Victor (1838–1882).

== Military career ==
Buckley joined the British Army on 24 June 1812, becoming an ensign in the 1st Foot Guards. With the Napoleonic Wars underway, he served with his regiment in the Peninsular War. Buckley first saw action at the Battle of the Bidassoa on 7 October 1813, and afterwards at the Battle of Nivelle on 10 November and Battle of the Nive in December. Buckley was promoted to lieutenant and captain on 23 March 1814. He then served at the Battle of Bayonne on 14 April, and was later awarded the Military General Service Medal for Nivelle and the Nive.

Buckley subsequently saw service in Belgium during the Hundred Days, fighting at the Battle of Quatre Bras and the Battle of Waterloo. He continued in the army after the end of the Napoleonic Wars, being promoted to brevet major on 19 July 1821. He was then advanced to lieutenant-colonel, unattached from any regiment, on 26 September 1826. Buckley went on half pay on 9 November 1830; while he saw no further active service he continued to be promoted by seniority. He became a brevet colonel on 23 November 1841, and was the promoted to major-general on 11 November 1851, lieutenant-general on 26 October 1858, and general on 17 August 1865. Alongside his last promotion he was appointed colonel of the regiment to the 83rd Regiment of Foot.

== Political career ==
Buckley was first elected Whig member of parliament for Salisbury at a by-election in 1853, caused by the death of Charles Baring Wall. He became a Liberal in 1859 and held the seat until the 1865 general election, when he did not seek re-election.

== Citations ==
Parliament of the United Kingdom
Preceded by William Chaplin; Charles Baring Wall	Member of Parliament for Salisbury; 1853–1865; With: Matthew Henry Marsh (1857–1865); William Chaplin (1853–1857)	Succeeded by Matthew Henry Marsh; Edward Hamilton
Military offices
Preceded by Sir Frederick Stovin	Colonel of the 83rd Regiment of Foot; 1865–1873	Succeeded by William Gustavus Brown
