= Anna Buckley =

American politician

Anna P. Buckley
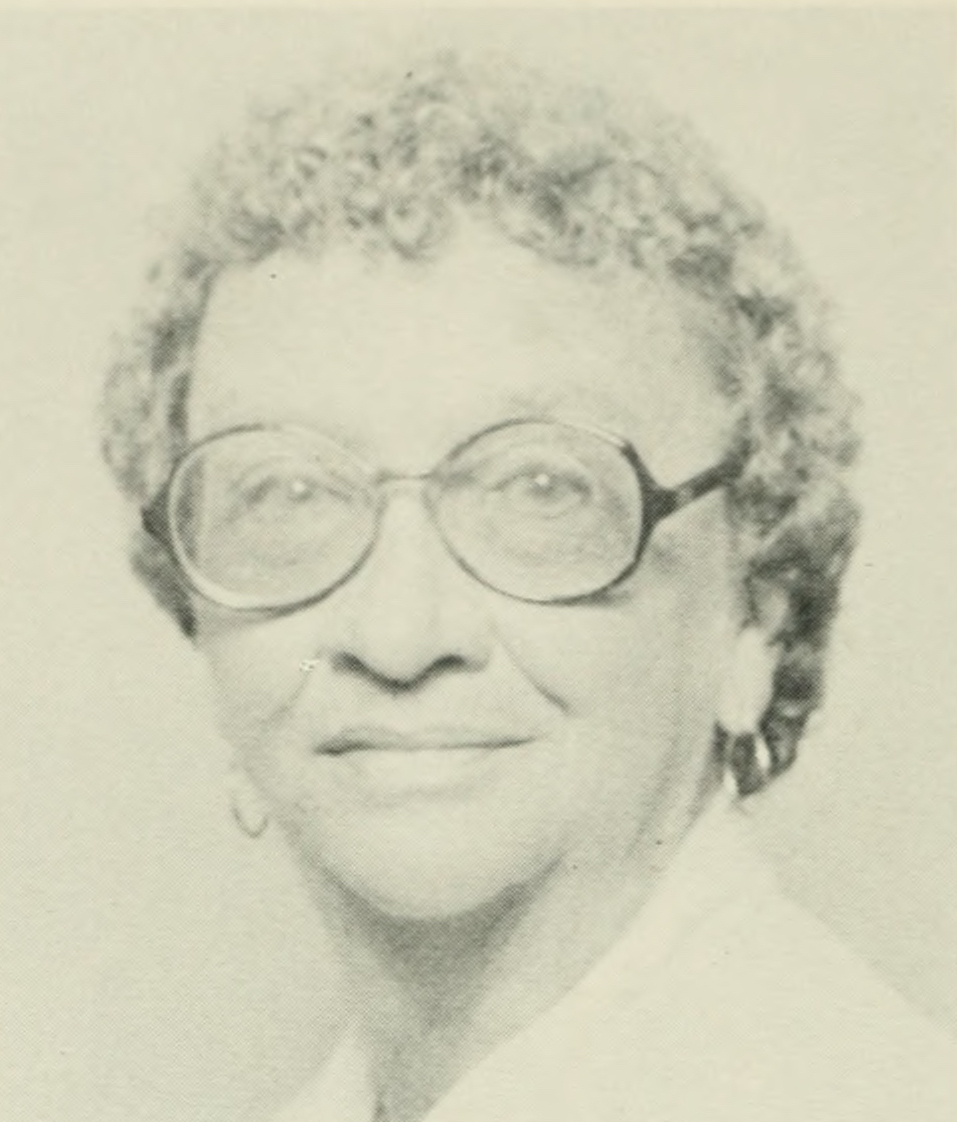

Member of the Massachusetts Senate from the First Plymouth and Plymouth and Norfolk districts
- In office 1973–1989
- Preceded by: James F. Burke
- Succeeded by: Michael C. Creedon

Personal details
- Born: March 21, 1924 Brockton, Massachusetts
- Died: May 3, 2003 (aged 79)
- Party: Democratic
- Education: St. Patrick's High School; Williams School of Business

Anna P. Buckley (1924–2003) was an American politician who served as a member of the Massachusetts Senate from 1973 to 1989.

== Early life ==
Buckley was born Anna Hernan on March 21, 1924, in Brockton, Massachusetts. She was orphaned at the age of 7 and went to live with her mother's cousin. After attending St. Patrick's High School and the Williams School of Business, Buckley joined the Women's Army Corps, where she served as a stenographer until the end of World War II. After the war she returned to Brockton, where she married Daniel Buckley and worked at an insurance agency.

== Political career ==
Buckley's first political involvement came as a volunteer for Joseph H. Downey's mayoral campaign in Brockton. During the 1960s she served as an administrative assistant to Francis X. Bellotti and Thaddeus Buczko.

In 1971, Buckley was elected to the Brockton city council. She was the first woman elected to the city council. The following year she was a candidate for state senate. She defeated state representative Robert Creedon in the Democratic primary by 84 votes. During her tenure in the Senate, Buckley was a supporter of subsidized day care and veterans' issues and worked to secure funding for Massasoit Community College. The college named its performing arts center after Buckley. She served as vice-chair of the Senate Ways and Means Committee and from 1985 to 1989 was the second assistant majority floor leader.

== Personal life and death ==
Anna and Daniel Buckley had three sons and two daughters. Daniel Buckley died in 1989. Anna Buckley died on May 3, 2003, from complications of cancer and pneumonia.
