= Brian Buckley (political advisor) =

Australian footballer and political advisor

Personal information
- Full name: Brian William Buckley
- Born: 29 March 1935; Footscray, Victoria
- Died: 26 May 2013 (aged 78)
- Original team: Gisborne
- Height: 183 cm (6 ft 0 in)
- Weight: 80 kg (176 lb)

Playing career^{1}
Years	Club	Games (Goals)
1956–59	Footscray	37 (3)
- ^{1} Playing statistics correct to the end of 1959.

Brian William Buckley (29 March 1935 – 26 May 2013) was an Australian rules footballer who played with Footscray in the Victorian Football League (VFL).

After football he became a teacher, journalist, a political press secretary for Phillip Lynch and then a political consultant. Married twice, including to former mayor of the City of Yarra, Jackie Fristacky, Buckley died in 2013 from cancer.
