= Cyril Buckley =

English cricketer (1905–1974)

Personal information
- Full name: (Cyril) Francis Stewart Buckley
- Born: 21 February 1905; Chelsea, London, England
- Died: 11 June 1974 (aged 69); Chelsea, London, England
- Batting: Unknown
- Role: Wicket-keeper
- Relatives: Alfred Buckley (great-uncle)

Domestic team information
- Years: Team
- 1924–1935: Berkshire

Career statistics
Competition	First-class
Matches	3
Runs scored	53
Batting average	10.60
100s/50s	–/1
Top score	50
Catches/stumpings	5/–
- Source: Cricinfo, 13 February 2019

Cyril Francis Stewart Buckley (21 February 1905 – 11 June 1974) was an English first-class cricketer.

== Life ==
The son of Brigadier-General Basil Thorold Buckley and his wife, Emmeline Louise Edwards, he was born at Chelsea and was educated at Eton College. He began minor counties cricket for Berkshire in 1924, debuting against Cornwall. He played minor counties cricket for Berkshire until 1935, making a total of 39 appearances in the Minor Counties Championship. He played first-class cricket on three occasions for HDG Leveson Gower's XI in 1934, 1935 and 1936, all against Oxford University at Reigate. He scored 53 runs across five first-class innings, at an average of 10.60. 50 of those runs came in one innings during the 1934 match.

Buckley married Audrey Burmester, daughter of Rudolf Miles Burmester and Margery Gladys née Lloyd, in December 1928, with the couple having a son and a daughter. He died at Chelsea in June 1974 as the result of an accident. His great-uncle, Alfred Buckley, also played first-class cricket.
