= Steve Buckley (soccer) =

American soccer player (born 1950)

Personal information
- Full name: Stephan Buckley
- Date of birth: May 12, 1950 (age 76)
- Place of birth: Quincy, Illinois, U.S.
- Position: Defender

Youth career
- 1968–1969: STLCC-Florissant Valley
- 1971–1972: UMSL Tritons

Senior career*
Years	Team	Apps	(Gls)
1970–1975	Busch Soccer Club		
1977	St. Louis Stars	18	(1)
1978–1979	Indianapolis Daredevils		
- * Club domestic league appearances and goals

Steve Buckley (born May 12, 1950) is an American former soccer defender who played one season in the North American Soccer League and two in the American Soccer League.

Buckley attended St. Louis Community College-Florissant Valley, playing on the school's soccer team in 1968 and 1969. The Flo Valley Fury won the 1969 NJCAA soccer championship. In 1971, he entered University of Missouri–St. Louis where he was a 1971 and 1972 Second Team All American soccer player. From 1970 to 1975, Buckley played for the Busch Soccer Club. In 1977, he signed with the St. Louis Stars of the North American Soccer League. In 1978 and 1979, he played for the Indianapolis Daredevils of the American Soccer League.

Buckley was inducted into St. Louis Soccer Hall of Fame in 2010.
