= Mick Buckley (Sarsfields Gaelic footballer) =

Irish Gaelic footballer

Personal information
- Native name: Mícheál Ó Buachalla (Irish)
- Born: 1944 Newbridge, County Kildare, Ireland
- Height: 5 ft 11 in (180 cm)

Sport
- Sport: Gaelic football
- Position: Midfield
Club
- Years: Club
- Sarsfields
Club titles
- Kildare titles: 0
Inter-county
- Years: County
- Kildare
Inter-county titles
- Leinster titles: 0
- All-Irelands: 0
- NFL: 0
- All Stars: 0

Michael Buckley (born 1944) is an Irish former Gaelic footballer. At club level, he played with Sarsfields and he was also a member of the Kildare senior football team.

== Career ==
Buckley played his club Gaelic football with Sarsfields, however, his senior team career coincided with a barren spell in terms of success for the club. At inter-county level, he was a substitute on the Kildare team that won the All-Ireland U21FC title in 1965. Buckley also made several appearances for the senior team.

== Personal life ==
Buckley's father, Mick Buckley Snr, won three All-Ireland SFC medals with Kildare and captained the team in 1928. His son, Niall Buckley, was part of the Kildare team beaten by Galway in the 1998 All-Ireland final.

== Honours ==
Kildare

- All-Ireland Under-21 Football Championship: 1965
- Leinster Under-21 Football Championship: 1965
