= Ellice (surname) =

Ellice is a surname, and may refer to:

- Alexander Ellice (fur trader) 1743–1805), Scottish merchant who made his fortune in the North American fur trade
- Alexander Ellice (politician) (1791–1853), British naval officer and Member of Parliament, son of Alexander Ellice
- Andrew Ellice, Welsh army officer and politician who sat in the House of Commons in 1654
- Edward Ellice (merchant) (1783–1863), British merchant and politician, son of Alexander Ellice
- Edward Ellice (MP for St Andrews) (1810–1880), Scottish Liberal Party politician, son of the above
- Edward Charles Ellice (1858–1934), British Liberal Party politician
- Katherine Ellice (1813–1864), British diarist and artist
- Robert Ellice (Royalist) (fl.1640), Welsh Royalist army officer of the First English Civil War
- Robert Ellice (1784–1856), British Army general, son of Alexander Ellice
- Russell Ellice (c. 1799–1873), Chairman of the East India Company and director of the British American Land Company, son of Alexander Ellice
