= Eliza Courtney =

Illegitimate daughter of Charles Grey and Georgiana, Duchess of Devonshire (1792-1859)

- Born: 20 February 1792; Aix-en-Provence, France
- Died: 2 May 1859 (aged 67); Norwood, Surrey, England
- Spouse: Robert Ellice (m. 1814)
- Children: Georgiana Ellice; Eliza Ellice; Alexandra Ellice; Robert Ellice; Sir Charles Henry Ellice
- Parents: Charles Grey, 2nd Earl Grey; Georgiana Cavendish, Duchess of Devonshire
- Relatives: Alexander Ellice (father-in-law)

Elizabeth Courtney (20 February 1792 – 2 May 1859) was the illegitimate daughter of the Whig politician and future Prime Minister Charles Grey, 2nd Earl Grey, and socialite Georgiana Cavendish (née Spencer), Duchess of Devonshire, while Georgiana was married to William Cavendish, 5th Duke of Devonshire.

The Duchess was forced by her husband to relinquish Eliza shortly after her birth, to be raised by Charles Grey's parents, Charles Grey, 1st Earl Grey, and Elizabeth Grey. The Duchess came to visit Eliza in secret. Eliza named her firstborn daughter Georgiana.

The name Courtney, extinct since the death of Charles Kelland Courtney in 1761, was derived from her great-uncle, her maternal grandmother's brother, William Poyntz (d. 1809), having married Isabella (d. 1805), sister and co-heiress of the aforementioned Charles Courtney, the last of the west country family of Courtney of Trethurfe and Courtney of Tremeer.

== Upbringing ==
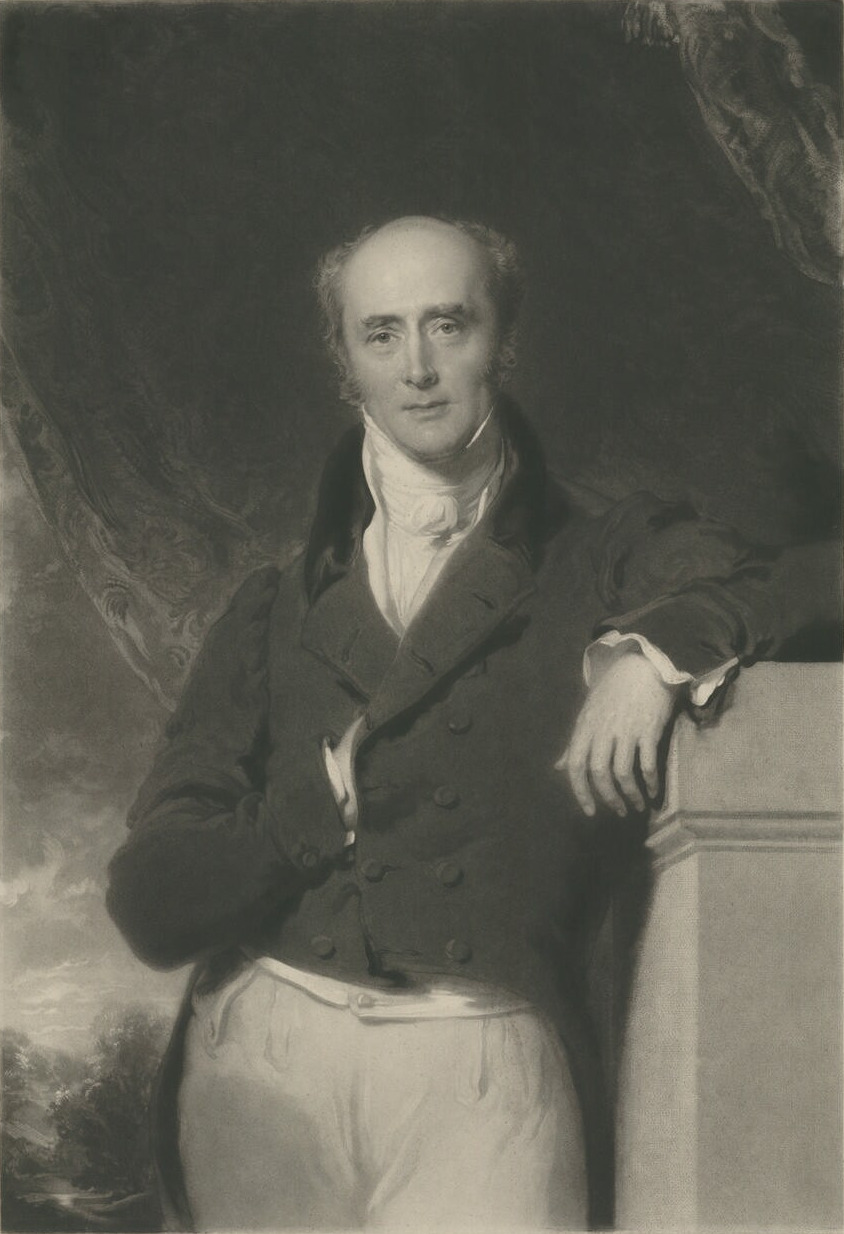
Her father

Her mother, Georgiana, a stipple engraving (published 1782) after a drawing by Lady Diana Beauclerk dated 1779

Eliza Courtney was born in France, in Aix-en-Provence on 20 February 1792. She was brought to Falloden, Northumberland in northern England and adopted by her paternal grandparents. Unlike her mother's legitimate children from her marriage, Eliza was not raised as part of the Devonshire House set in London. Her mother, Georgiana, could not acknowledge her daughter and visited her in secret until her own death. Several anguish-ridden poems from mother to daughter survive; two are reproduced below:

And yet remote from public view
Flower there is of timid hue,
Beneath a sacred shade it grows,
But sweet in native fragrance blows.
From storms secure, from tempests free,
But ah! too seldom seen by me.
For scarce permitted to behold
With longing eyes each grace unfold.

My bosom struggles with its pain
And checks the wishes form'd in vain;
Yet when I perchance supremely blest,
I hold the floweret to my breast,
Enraptur'd watch its purple glow
And blessings (all I have) bestow.
The gentle fragrance soothes my care
And fervent is my humble prayer
That no dread evil may beset
My sweet but hidden violet.

Unhappy child of indiscretion,
poor slumberer on a breast forlorn
pledge of reproof of past transgression
Dear tho' unfortunate to be born

For thee a suppliant wish addressing
To Heaven thy mother fain would dare
But conscious blushes stain the blessing
And sighs suppress my broken prayer

But in spite of these my mind unshaken
In present duty turns to thee
Tho' long repented ne'er forgotten
Thy days shall lov'd and guarded be

And should th'ungenerous world upbraid thee
for mine and for thy father's ill
A nameless mother oft shall assist thee
A hand unseen protect thee still

And tho' to rank and wealth a stranger
Thy life a humble course must run
Soon shalt thou learn to fly the danger
Which I too late have learnt to shun

Meanwhile in these sequested vallies
Here may'st thou live in safe content
For innocence may smile at malice
And thou-Oh ! Thou art innocent

Georgiana was allowed to see her daughter occasionally when the Greys brought Eliza to London, and acted as a sort of unofficial godmother.

In 1808, her maternal aunt Henrietta Ponsonby, Countess of Bessborough, who didn't know she was Eliza's aunt, visited the Greys and was dismayed at what she observed:

Eliza is a fine girl, and will, I think, be handsome; but tho' they are kind to her, it goes to my heart to see her—she is so evidently thrown into the background, and has such a look of mortification about her that it is not pleasant, yet he [Charles Grey] seems very fond of her. Lord B. [Harriet's husband] has this moment ask'd me whether she is not the Governess.

Eliza was not informed of her true parentage until after the death of her mother in 1806.

== Marriage ==
In 1809, Eliza's "quasi-sister" (but actual aunt) Lady Hannah Althea Grey, widow of George Edmund Byron Bettesworth, married MP and trader the Rt. Hon. Edward "Bear" Ellice (1783–1863). Five years later, on 10 December 1814 in Scarborough, North Yorkshire, Eliza married Lt. Col. Robert Charles Ellice, a younger brother of her "brother-in-law" Edward Ellice. Their father was Alexander Ellice (1743–1805) of Bath, London, and Montreal, a partner in the Schenectady, New York firm of Phyn, Ellice & Co.

In March 1814, Lord Broughton recorded meeting Eliza at dinner and described her as:

the daughter of the late Duchess of Devonshire by Lord Grey, … a fine girl, sensible and talkative, and easy mannered.

Robert Ellice had a distinguished military career, rising from the military rank of ensign to general.

Rank	Date
Ensign	8 November 1798
Captain	4 May 1801
Major	12 May 1808
Lt. Colonel	16 March 1809
Colonel	2 November 1822
Major-General	22 July 1830
Lieutenant-General	23 November 1841
General	20 June 1854

At some point he served in South America and was present at the capture of Buenos Aires.

Ellice was acting Governor of Malta for five-and-a-half months, from 13 May to 27 October 1851.

In the 1856 Webster's, he is listed as having a residence at 57 Park Street, Mayfair. He died 18 June 1856.

== Children ==
Eliza Courtney and Robert Ellice had at least four children.

=== Robert ===
Eliza's son Robert was born on 1 January 1816. In March 1853, he married Eglantine Charlotte Louisa Balfour (died 18 April 1907), third daughter of Lieutenant-General Robert Balfour, 6th of Balbirnie. Robert Ellice died on 19 December 1858.

In 1880 his son Major Edward Charles Ellice DSO JP (1858–1934), later the Liberal member of parliament for St Andrews Boroughs, succeeded his first cousin once removed, Edward Ellice the Younger to the Ellice estate at Invergarry, Inverness, Scotland.

In April 1889 Edward Charles Ellice married a first cousin-once-removed, Margaret Georgiana Thomas, daughter of Frederick Freeman Thomas by his wife Mabel Brand, daughter of Henry Brand, 1st Viscount Hampden. Like him, Margaret Georgiana was a descendant of Eliza Courtney, through Eliza's second daughter Eliza. Her brother was Freeman Freeman-Thomas, Viceroy of India, and was created 1st Marquess of Willingdon.

Their fifth son, Russell (1902–1989) succeeded his father, his four elder brothers having died young: three of them in the First World War: one was in the Cameron Highlanders (killed in action), one in the Grenadiers (killed in action) and the third was lost on HMS Bulwark.

=== Georgiana ===
Eliza's first daughter, Georgiana, was born on 12 October 1817. On 4 November 1846, Georgiana Ellice married Hugh Horatio Seymour (1821–1892). Seymour was the son of Lieutenant-Colonel Hugh Henry Seymour (1790–1821), himself a grandson of Francis Seymour-Conway, 1st Marquess of Hertford by his marriage to Charlotte Cholmondeley, daughter of George Cholmondeley, 1st Marquess of Cholmondeley.

His grandson was Sir Horace James Seymour GCMG, CVO (1885–1978), a diplomat who was British Minister in Tehran from 1936 to 1939 and British Ambassador to China, 1942 to 1946. One of Sir Horace's grandsons, James Seymour (born 1956) is married to Anya Hindmarch.

=== Elizabeth Georgiana ===
Eliza had another daughter, named Elizabeth Georgiana, in 1818. This Elizabeth married Henry Bouverie William Brand (1814–1892) in 1838. After a distinguished speakership of the House of Commons, Eliza's husband was created Viscount Hampden; later still he inherited from his brother the Barony of Dacre. Descendants include Sarah Ferguson and her daughters Princess Beatrice and Princess Eugenie; and Anthony Brand, 6th Viscount Hampden. Elizabeth Georgiana Brand died on 8 March 1899 at Pelham House, Lewes.

=== Charles Henry ===
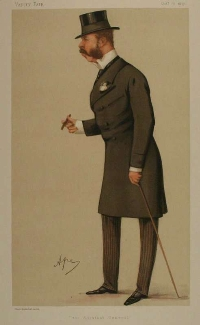
Charles Henry Ellice

Eliza's second son, Charles Henry, was born in 1823 in Florence. Charles followed his father into the 24th Regiment of Foot and was sometime Quartermaster-General and then Adjutant-General to the Forces. He married Louisa Caroline Lambton, a daughter of William Henry Lambton and niece of the John Lambton, 1st Earl of Durham. Thom's Upper Ten Thousand for 1876 lists him as of Horningsheath, Bury St Edmunds. He was subject of Vanity Fair treatment, 20 October 1877. General Sir Charles Henry Ellice, KCB died in 1888.

== Death ==
Eliza died on 2 May 1859, at the age of 67, and was buried on 7 May at Kensal Green Cemetery, when her address was stated as Queen's Hotel, Norwood, and 2, Cadogan Place. Eliza Courtney's descendants include Sarah, Duchess of York, and her daughters Princesses Beatrice and Eugenie.

== Ancestors ==
Ancestors of Eliza Courtney

16. John Grey, of Howick
8. Sir Henry Grey, 1st Baronet, of Howick
17. Margaret Pearson
4. Charles Grey, 1st Earl Grey
18. Thomas Wood
9. Hannah Wood
19. N. N.
2. Charles Grey, 2nd Earl Grey, Prime Minister of Great Britain
20. George Grey, of Southwick
10. George Grey, of Southwick
21. Alice Clavering
5. Elizabeth Grey
22. Dr. Nathaniel Ogle
11. Elizabeth Ogle
23. Elizabeth Newton
1. Eliza Courtney
24. Charles Spencer, 3rd Earl of Sunderland
12. The Hon. John Spencer
25. Lady Anne Churchill
6. John Spencer, 1st Earl Spencer
26. John Carteret, 2nd Earl Granville
13. Lady Georgiana Carolina Carteret
27. Frances Worsley
3. Lady Georgiana Spencer
28. William Poyntz
14. Stephen Poyntz
29. Jane Monteage
7. Margaret Georgiana Poyntz
30. The Hon. Lewis Mordaunt
15. Anna Maria Mordaunt
31. Mary Collyer

== Biography ==
- Georgiana, Duchess of Devonshire by Amanda Foreman, HarperCollins, London, 1998. ISBN 0-00-655016-9
- Privilege and Scandal: The Remarkable Life of Harriet Spencer, Sister of Georgiana by Janet Gleeson, Crown Publishers, New York, 2006. ISBN 978-0-307-38197-2
- Brian Masters, Georgiana Duchess of Devonshire, Hamish Hamilton, 1981.
- The Earl of Bessborough (editor), Georgiana, John Murray, London, 1955.
- Anthony Brand, Henry and Eliza, printed privately in Haywards Heath, 1980 (197 pages, paperback). Letters between her daughter and son-in-law.
- Peter Townend (ed), Burke's Peerage and Baronetage, 105th edition, London 1970 (1978, 3rd impression).
- See the film The Duchess, 2008.

== Other ==
- Phyn, Ellice and Company of Schenectady, by R. H. Fleming in Contributions to Canadian Economics, Vol. 4, 1932 (1932), pp. 7–41.
- The New Annual Army List and Militia List for 1854, the 17th annual volume, by Major Henry G. Hart, John Murray, Albemarle street, London, 1854.
- Webster's Royal Red Book; or Court and Fashionable Register, for January, 1856, Webster & Co., 60 Piccadilly, London.
- The Upper Ten Thousand, for 1876, A biographical handbook of all the titled and official classes of the Kingdom with their addresses, compiled and edited by Adam Bisset Thom, Kelly & Co., London. (First published 1875).
- Burke's Genealogical and Heraldic History of the Landed Gentry, 1952, edited L. G. Pine, London, (sub. Ellice of Invergarry, page 744–745)
