= 1903 St Andrews Burghs by-election =

UK parliamentary by-election

St Andrews Burghs, by-election 1903
- 17 September 1903

Candidate	Ellice	Anstruther-Thomson
Party	Liberal	Liberal Unionist
Popular vote	1,324	1,288
Percentage	50.7%	49.3%
MP before election
Anstruther
Liberal Unionist
Subsequent MP
Anstruther-Thomson
Liberal Unionist

The 1903 St Andrews Burghs by-election was a Parliamentary by-election held on 17 September 1903. The constituency returned one Member of Parliament (MP) to the House of Commons of the United Kingdom, elected by the first past the post voting system.

== Vacancy ==
Henry Torrens Anstruther had been Liberal Unionist MP for the seat of St Andrews Burghs since the 1886 general election. He resigned on taking up the position of a Director of the Suez Canal.

== Electoral history ==
The seat had been Liberal Unionist since they gained it in 1886. They held the seat at the last election, with a decreased majority;

General election January 1900
Party	Candidate	Votes	%	±%
Liberal Unionist	Henry Torrens Anstruther	1,148	51.2	−3.3
Liberal	James Annand	1,094	48.8	+3.3
Majority		54	2.4	−6.6
Turnout		2,242	76.0	−5.1
Liberal Unionist hold		Swing	-3.3	

== Candidates ==
The local Liberal Unionist Association selected 44-year-old Major William Anstruther-Thomson as their candidate to defend the seat. He served in South Africa from 1901-1902 where he was commandant of the district of Knysna in 1901, and Inspector of Concentration Camps in Transvaal in 1902.

The local Liberal Association selected 45-year-old Captain Edward Charles Ellice as their candidate to gain the seat. He was cousin and heir of Edward Ellice, a previous MP for the constituency.

== Campaign ==
Polling Day was fixed for the 17 September 1903, just days after the previous MP resigned his seat.

Ellice, the Liberal candidate, declared himself against Home Rule for Ireland and also declined to support the disestablishment of the church in Scotland, both Liberal policies. This made his campaign less distinguishable from the Liberal Unionists. However, the candidates did differ on the question of trade, Ellice supported the Liberal position of support for Free trade while Thomson supported Tariff Reform as being advocated by leading Unionist Joseph Chamberlain.

== Result ==
The Liberals gained the seat from the Liberal Unionists;

1903 St Andrews Burghs by-election
Party	Candidate	Votes	%	±%
Liberal	Edward Charles Ellice	1,324	50.7	+1.9
Liberal Unionist	William Anstruther-Thomson	1,288	49.3	−1.9
Majority		36	1.4	N/A
Turnout		2,612	82.6	+6.6
Liberal gain from Liberal Unionist		Swing	+1.9	

== Aftermath ==
Anstruther-Thomson changed his name in 1904 to Anstruther-Gray. At the following general election, he re-gained the seat, the result was;

General election January 1906
Party	Candidate	Votes	%	±%
Liberal Unionist	William Anstruther-Gray	1,495	50.4	+1.1
Liberal	Edward Charles Ellice	1,472	49.6	−1.1
Majority		23	0.8	N/A
Turnout		2,967	91.4	+8.8
Liberal Unionist gain from Liberal		Swing	+1.1	
