= Jhelum (disambiguation) =

Jhelum is a city in Pakistan on the banks of the Jhelum River.

Jhelum or Jehlum may also refer to:

- Jhelum District, an administrative division in Punjab, Pakistan surrounding the city of Jhelum
- History of Jhelum, history of the district of Jhelum, surrounding the city of Jhelum, in modern-day Pakistan
- Jhelum River, a tributary of the Indus in northern Pakistan and Indian Kashmir, also known as Hydaspes
- Jhelum Tehsil, an administrative sub-division in Punjab, Pakistan surrounding the city of Jhelum
- Jhelum Valley, Pakistan, a valley in Azad Kashmir, Pakistan
- River Jhelum, another name for the Tan Shan River in Hong Kong (China)
- Jhelum (ship), an East Indiaman, which was abandoned by its crew after it sank in Stanley Harbour in 1871
- Battle of Jhelum, a battle fought by Alexander the Great in 326 BC against King Porus of the Paurava kingdom on the banks of the river Hydaspes (now known as the Jhelum).
- Battle of Jhelum - Indian Mutiny, a battle in 1857 fought between British East India Company Forces and Mutineers

== See also ==
- Hydaspes (mythology), the Jhelum River in mythology
- Hydaspes (Mancini), an opera by Francesco Mancini
