= Alexander Ellice =

Alexander Ellice may refer to:

- Alexander Ellice (fur trader) (1743–1805), British merchant who made his fortune in the North American fur trade
- Alexander Ellice (politician) (1791–1853), British naval officer and Member of Parliament, son of the above
