= Edward Charles Ellice =

Liberal party MP

Edward Ellice

Major Edward Charles Ellice, DSO, JP, DL (1 January 1858 – 21 February 1934) was Liberal MP for St Andrews Burghs.

== Biography ==
He was the son of Robert Ellice (1816–1858) and Eglantine "Tina" Balfour (1816–1907), the grandson of Robert Ellice and Eliza Courtney, a grandnephew of Edward Ellice, and a cousin and the heir of the latter's son, heir and namesake, Edward Ellice, who was a previous MP for the constituency.

Educated at Harrow School and Royal Military College, Sandhurst, Ellice was commissioned in the Grenadier Guards in 1876 or 1877, and promoted to captain on 5 August 1886. Following the outbreak of the Second Boer War in late 1899, he joined Lord Lovat's Corps as a captain of mounted infantry on 21 February 1900. The corps was raised by Simon Fraser, 14th Lord Lovat and served in South Africa through the war.

Ellice was elected at the 1903 St Andrews Burghs by-election, gaining the seat from the Liberal Unionists. He sought re-election at the 1906 General Election but was narrowly defeated.

During the First World War, he rejoined the Grenadier Guards in 1914 and commanded the 7th (Guards) Entrenching Battalion in France. He was appointed a Companion of the Distinguished Service Order in 1918.

He was deputy-director of the Invergarry and Fort Augustus Railway.

== Electoral record ==
1903 St Andrews Burghs by-election
Party	Candidate	Votes	%	±%
Liberal	Edward Charles Ellice	1,324	50.7	+1.9
Liberal Unionist	William Anstruther-Thomson	1,288	49.3	−1.9
Turnout				
Majority		36	1.4	3.8
Liberal gain from Liberal Unionist		Swing	+1.9	

General election January 1906: St Andrews Burghs
Party	Candidate	Votes	%	±%
Liberal Unionist	William Anstruther-Gray	1,495	50.4	+1.1
Liberal	Edward Charles Ellice	1,472	49.6	−1.1
Majority		23	0.8	2.2
Turnout				
Liberal Unionist gain from Liberal		Swing		

== Family ==
He married Margaret Georgiana Thomas (1865–1929), daughter of cricketer Freeman Thomas and sister of Major Freeman Freeman-Thomas, 1st Marquess of Willingdon, on 11 April 1889. They had ten children:

- Marion Ellice (8 October 1890)
- Edward Ellice (6 December 1891 – about 1893)
- Isobel Ellice (18 November 1892)
- Alexander Ellice (19 November 1894 – 16 October 1916) died in World War I, age 21
- Margaret Ellice (19 March 1896)
- Andrew Robert Ellice (13 October 1897 – 28 September 1916) died in World War I, age 18
- William Ellice (19 December 1898 – 26 November 1914) died in World War I when an internal explosion sank HMS Bulwark, age 15
- Eglantine Ellice (9 January 1900 – 1989)
- Russell Ellice (14 November 1902 – 1989)
- Charles Ellice (7 March 1905)

Parliament of Great Britain
Preceded by Henry Torrens Anstruther	Member of Parliament for St Andrews Burghs; 1903–1906	Succeeded by William Anstruther-Gray
