= History of Jhelum =

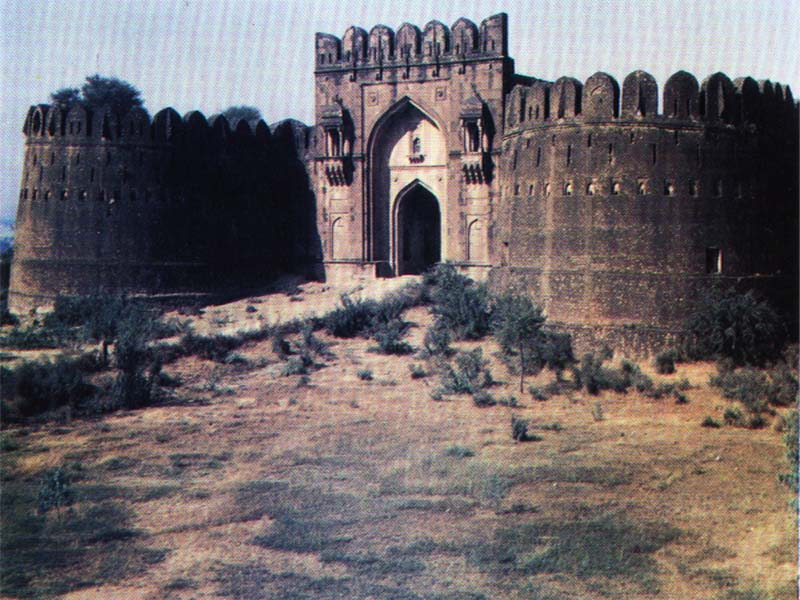
Sohail Gate, Rohtas Fort.

The recorded history of Jhelum (Urdu: تاريخ جہلم), a district of modern-day Pakistan, covers thousands of years. Since its creation, Persian, Greek, Hindu, Buddhist, Muslim, Sikh, and British influences have dominated it to the present-day Pakistan.

Jhelum is near the site of the famous Battle of the Hydaspes between the armies of Alexander the Great and Raja Porus. This battle took place a few miles downstream from the city centre, along the river banks. The city was founded to commemorate the death of Alexander's horse, Bucephalus, and was originally called Bucephala. Nearby there is also the historic 16th-century Rohtas Fort, another historic fort since Sikh era located at the backside of the main bus stand near Railway Phatak Jhelum City. It is now being used as stores under Railway Authorities and also Tilla Jogian; a centuries-long history of the area.

== Early history ==
The history of the district dates back to the semi-mythical period of the Mahabharata. Hindu tradition represents the Salt Range as the refuge of the five Pandava brethren during their exile. Every salient point in its scenery is connected with some legend of the national heroes. Modern research has fixed the site of the conflict between Alexander and Porus as within Jhelum district. However, the exact spot at which the Macedonian king affected the passage of the Jhelum (or Hydespes) was hotly disputed.

== Greek period ==
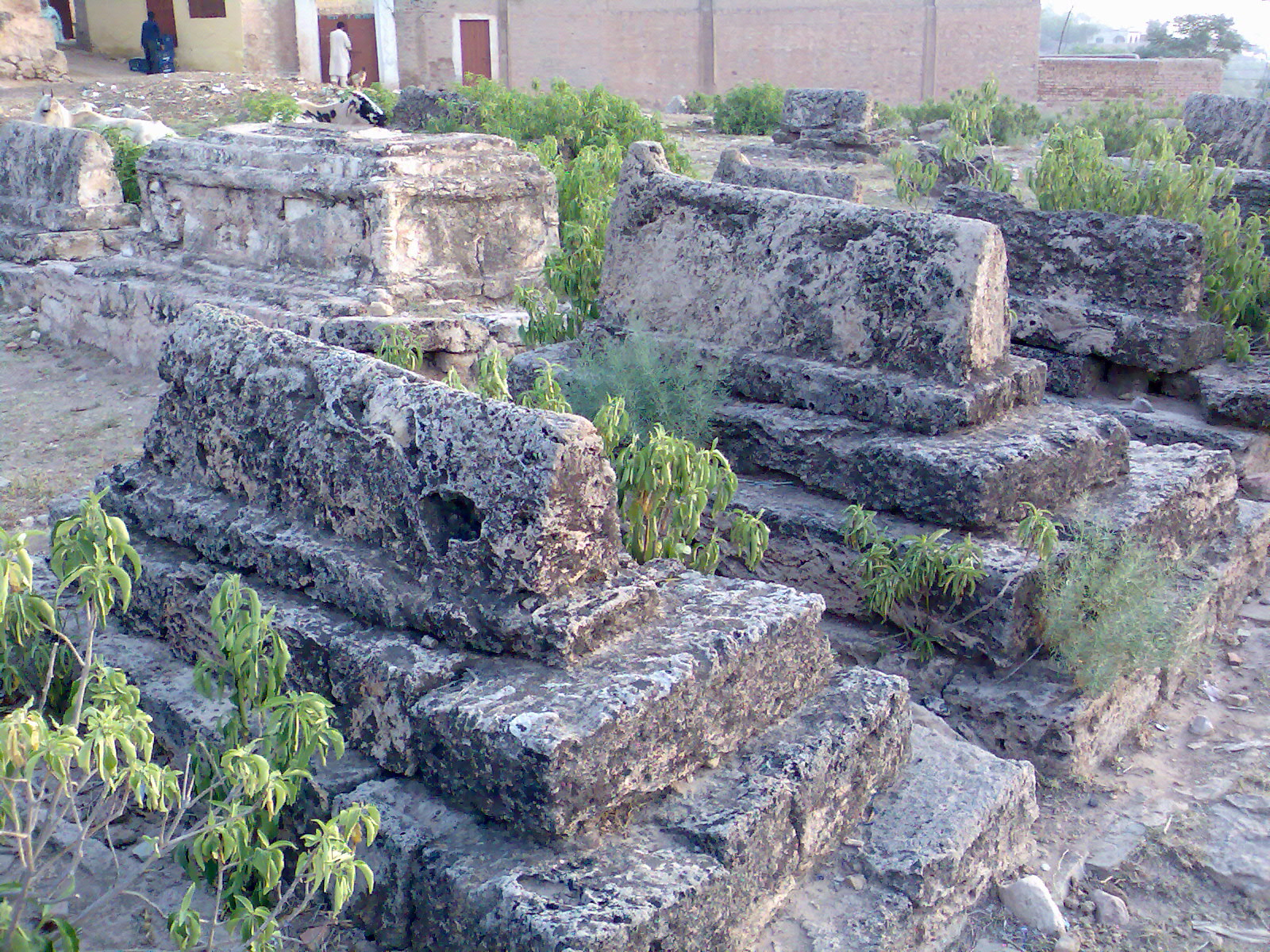
Ancient graveyard of Alexander's period.

Alexander moved from ancient Taxila of Raja Ambhi, whom he subdued without a fight, to Kalar Kahar. He moved over the Salt Range, turning left, along the western bank of River Jhelum, which he called Hydaspes. Opposite him on the other bank was a Raja Porus. They fought one of the biggest and most fierce battles of Alexander's whole campaign, which eventually Alexander won, after using a surprise move against the valiant Porus but with great difficulty and a heavy loss of life on Alexander's side too. Before moving further, Alexander established a village on the west bank of the River and ordered the construction of 2000 boats. Greek Admiral Nearches was to arrange wood from nearby higher hills, which would be floated down the River and hauled up at this point. He called this village as Boucephila (present-day Jhelum City). The Jhelum River passes vying with the residential areas of the city.

The mosque inside the river is a famous landmark most commuters on the Grand Trunk Road even today. Alexander's Naval Chief was assigned the task of boats building on a very large scale. Therefore, the craftsmen were gathered, hence the modern colonies in the city named as Machine Mohallahs (Number 1, 2 and 3), because of the saw mills. Jhelum became timber market for the whole of Punjab over the millenniums. It was only after the construction of Mangla Dam that log wood does not float down the river, and the city has lost this privilege. There is a plywood factory also, which is flourishing. Greeks left marks of their chivalry and martial spirit, which mixed up well with the races and clans dwelling in the area.

== Early Muslim period ==
In 997 CE, Sultan Mahmud Ghaznavi, took over the Ghaznavid dynasty empire established by his father, Sultan Sebuktegin, In 1005 he conquered the Hindu Shahis in Kabul in 1005, and followed it by the conquests of Punjab region in including the Jhelum District. The Delhi Sultanate and later Mughal Empire ruled the region. The Punjab region became predominantly Muslim due to missionary Sufi saints whose dargahs dot the landscape of Punjab region.

The Janjuas and Khokhars, who now hold the Salt Range and its northern plateau respectively, appear to have been the earliest inhabitants.

The Gakhars, who appear to represent an early wave of conquest from the west, and who still inhabit a large tract in the east of the District; while the Awans, who now cluster in the western plain, are apparently later invaders, the Gakhars were the dominant race during the early Muslim era and they long continued to retain their independence, both in Jhelum itself and in the neighbouring District of Rawalpindi.

== Sikh era ==
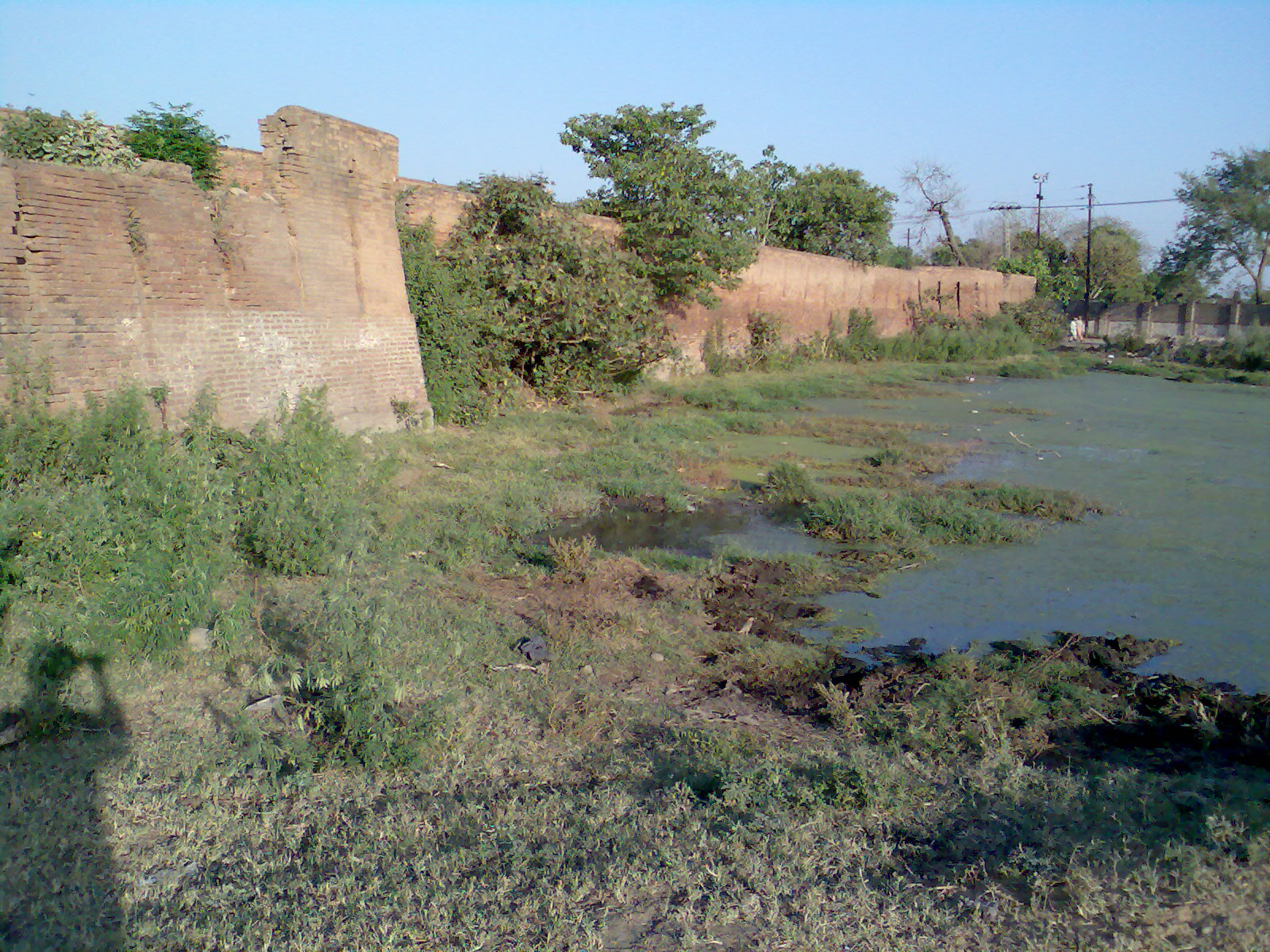
A Fort in Jhelum City, built during Sikh era.

In 1765 Gujar Singh defeated the last independent Gakhars Chief, Muqarrrab Khan, and reduced the wild mountaineers of the Salt Range and the Murree Hills to subjection. After the decline of the Mughal Empire, the Sikh invaded and occupied Multan District. The Muslims faced severe restrictions during the Sikh rule. Gujar Singh's son succeeded to his dominions until 1810, when it fell to Ranjit Singh. Under the Lahore government the dominant classes of Jhelum suffered much from fiscal actions;.

== British era ==
In 1847 Jhelum passed with the rest of the Sikh territories into the power of the British.In 1857 the 14th Native Infantry stationed at Jhelum town mutinied, and made a vigorous defence against a force sent from Rawalpindi to disarm them, but decamped on the night following the action, the main body. Being subsequently arrested by the Kashmir authorities, into whose territory they had escaped. British established administration at district level and Jhelum District, which originally was covering large area including Pindigheb and territory up to Indus River, was delimited later to include tehsils of Jhelum, Chakwal and Pind Dadan Khan, with District Headquarters shifting from Pind Dadan Khan to Jhelum. During the 20th Century, this city has a proud history of chivalry and achievements.

During British rule, Jhelum was a district of Rawalpindi Division, and was larger than the current district of Jhelum. On April 1, 1914, the tehsil of Talagang was detached from the District and incorporated with the new District of Attock. The old Jhelum district (minus Talagang) covered an area of 7285 km^{2} and included Chakwal tehsil - it was bounded by Shahpur and Attock to the west, and by Rawalpindi to the north - the Jhelum River separated it from Kashmir to the north-east and from Gujrat and Shahpur to the south-east and south.

During British rule, Jhelum was connected by the North-Western Railway to other cities in the Indian empire, 1,367 miles from Calcutta, 1,413 from Bombay, and 849 from Karachi. The population according to the 1901 census of India was 14,951.

According to the Imperial Gazetteer of India:

"The present town is of modern origin, the old town, which may have been the Bucephala of Alexander having been, on the left or opposite bank of the river. Under Sikh rule the place was quite unimportant, being mainly occupied by a settlement of boatmen, and at the time of annexation contained about 500 houses. It was then chosen as the site of a cantonment and as the headquarters of the civil administration. For some years it was the seat of the Commissioner of the Division, but in 1859 his headquarters were transferred to Rawalpindi. Under British rule Jhelum has steadily advanced in prosperity; and it is the entrepôt for most of the trade of the District, though, since the completion of the Sind-Sāgar branch of the North-Western Railway; the salt trade no longer passes through it. It is an important timber dépôt, the timber from the Kashmir forests which is floated down the river being collected here. A good deal of boat-building is carried on. The cantonment, which is 3 miles from the civil station, contains the church and post office. The normal strength of the garrison is one Native cavalry and four Native infantry regiments. The municipality was founded 1867. During the ten years ending 1902-3 the receipts averaged Rs. 32,100, and the expenditure Rs, 31,900. Receipts and expenditure from cantonment funds in the same period averaged Rs. 31,900 and Rs. 6,100 respectively. The chief income of the municipality in 1903-4 was Rs. 34,200 chiefly from octroi; and the expenditure was Rs. 41,000. The town has two Anglo vernacular schools, a municipal high school, and a middle school maintained by the American Presbyterian Mission. Besides the civil hospital, the mission also maintains a ."

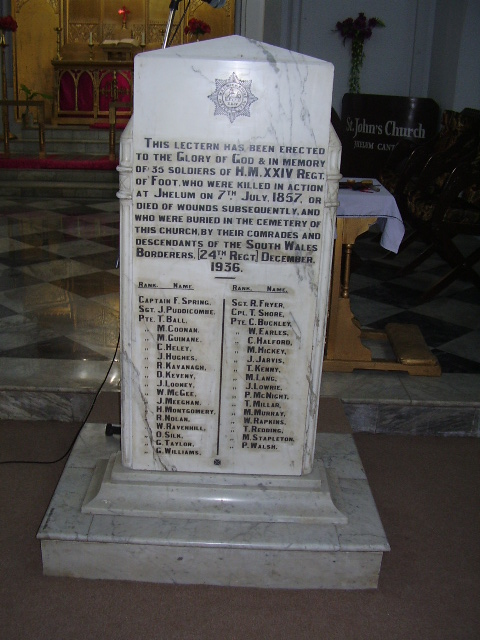
Marble Lectern in memory of 35 British soldiers.

During the Indian Rebellion of 1857, also known as the Indian Mutiny, 35 British soldiers of the Regular 24th Regiment of Foot were killed at the Battle of Jhelum by mutineers from the Honourable East India Companies 14th Bengal Native Infantry (roughly 500 of the soldiers mutinied with roughly 100 of the Sikh soldiers remaining loyal). Among the dead was Captain Francis Spring, the eldest son of Colonel William Spring. A lectern inside St. John's Church Jhelum shows the names of those 35 soldiers. St. John's Church is located in the Jhelum Cantonment, Pakistan beside the river Jhelum. It was built in 1860 and remains a landmark in the city. It was built as a Protestant church, and was in use throughout the British period. For the past forty years it has been closed to the public and in poor condition, however it has since been renovated and reopened and is now maintained.

The British soldier William Connolly won a Victoria Cross for his bravery during this battle. Mirza Dildar Baig, also known as Khaki Shah, took part in the mutiny at Jhelum and was later celebrated by Indian Nationalists. He was captured and arrested with the remaining mutineers by authorities in Kashmir and later hanged near the river Jhelum. His grave is in a shrine in Jhelum Dildarnagar, and a small town in Uttar Pradesh is also named after him.

The railway bridge on the river Jhelum was built in 1873 by the British engineer William St. John Galwey. He also made the great Empress Bridge over the river Sutlej.

== Independence ==
The predominantly Muslim population supported both the Muslim League and the Pakistan Movement. After the independence of Pakistan and partition from India in 1947, the minority Hindus and Sikhs were displaced to India while the Muslim refugees from India settled in the Jhelum District.

== Military history ==
Jhelum has long been a key recruiting ground for the Armed Forces and has a history of providing many soldiers in particular. It has sent men to serve first in the East India Company Army then the British Army and, more recently, to the Pakistan Armed Forces. As a result, it is known locally as the city of soldiers or land of martyrs and warriors. During the First World War, Jhelum was notable for providing a significant number of recruits to the Indian Expeditionary Force and, as a result, became a strong source of recruits for the British Indian Army right up to independence.

The first Victoria Cross to be awarded to a son of Jhelum (the highest Imperial, British and Commonwealth award for gallantry) was earned by Subedar Khuda Dad Khan during the First World War whilst fighting in Belgium. Later another son of Jhelum was to be awarded its equivalent; the Nishan-e-Haider of Pakistan. Major Muhammad Akram (Shaheed) received his award posthumously for his actions during the Indo-Pakistani War of 1971.

It is of note that when Pakistan declared independence in 1947, three out the four senior major generals of the new Pakistan Army were from Jhelum: Major General Muhammad Akbar, Major General Nazir Ahmed and Major General Muhammad Iftekhar. Other senior Pakistani military officers of note, who have originated from Jhelum, are; Air Commodore Muhammad Khan Janjua, General Asif Nawaz Janjua and Admiral Tariq Kamal Khan. Colonel Muhammad Khan, the author of Bajang Amad and Bazam Araian, also came from Jhelum.

Soldiers, Sailors and Airmen from Jhelum have distinguished themselves in combat from the time of the British Raj through the World Wars and the more recent conflicts with India. As a result several have won gallantry awards and accolades.

== Etymology ==
The famous writer of Jhelum District Anjum Sultan Shahbaz records some stories of the name Jhelum in his book Tareekh-e-Jhelum as:

Many writers have different opinions about the name of Jhelum. One reason is that in ancient days Jhelum was known as Jalham. The word Jhelum is reportedly derived from the words Jal (pure water) and Ham (snow). The name thus refers to the waters of a river (flowing besides the City) which has its origin in the snow-capped Himalayas.

However some writers says when “Dara-e-Azam” reached a certain place on the river bank by winning the many battles, he fixed his flag on that place and called that place “Ja-e-Alam” which mean “Place of Flag”. With the passage of time it became Jhelum from “Ja-e-Alam”.

According to a traditional story, Saeed Bin Abi Waqas, brother of Saad Bin Abi Waqas, was sent to China for preaching Islam, during his journey he reached at city of Jhelum, he saw the shadow of city in water of the river and said “هذا جهيلم” (this is jheelum), which means “City besides river, in full moon night”.

Here a notable point is that in English its spellings are Jhelum or Jheelum, not Jehlum.

Ahmed Shah Abdali also used “Jheelum” in place of Jhelum and “Harian” for Kharian in his Diary.

(Shahbaz, Anjum Sultan (September 2003). Tareekh-e-Jhelum (urdu). history of jhelum (2nd ed.). Book Corner, Main Bazar, Jhelum. p. 92.)
