= Edmond Wodehouse =

Edmond or Edmund Wodehouse may refer to:

- Edmond Wodehouse (Bath MP) (1835–1914), English Liberal and Liberal Unionist politician, member of parliament for Bath, 1880–1906
- Edmond Wodehouse (Norfolk MP) (1784–1855), English Tory and Conservative politician, member of parliament for Norfolk, 1817–1830, and for Norfolk East, 1835–1855
- Edmund Wodehouse (British Army officer) (1819–1898), son of the member of parliament for Norfolk
