= Battle of Jhelum (disambiguation) =

Battle of the Hydaspes, also known as the Battle of Jhelum, was a battle fought by Alexander the Great in 326 BC against Porus on the banks of the river Hydaspes (now known as the Jhelum).

Battle of Jhelum may also refer to these battles at Jhelum:

- Battle of Jhelum (1206), a rebellion against the Ghurids and Muhammad of Ghur
- Battle of Jhelum (1766), part of the Indian campaign of Ahmad Shah Durrani
- Battle of Jhelum (1769), part of the Indian campaign of Ahmad Shah Durrani
- Battle of Jhelum (1857), a battle between British East India Company and mutineers
