= Richard Edensor Heathcote =

British industrialist and politician

Richard Edensor Heathcote (1780–1850) was an English industrialist and politician.

He was the son of Sir John Edensor Heathcote of Longton Hall, and the former Anne Gresley, daughter of Sir Nigel Gresley, 6th Baronet. Heathcote was elected the Member of Parliament (MP) for Coventry in 1826 and at about the same time rebuilt Apedale Hall, near Newcastle-under-Lyme in Staffordshire, in the Elizabethan style. He died in 1850 at Genoa, Italy.

Heathcote married firstly his cousin Emma Gresley, a granddaughter of Sir Nigel Gresley, 6th Baronet. He married secondly Lady Elizabeth Lindsay, eldest daughter of General Alexander Lindsay, 6th Earl of Balcarres. His grandson, Captain Justinian Edwards-Heathcote, was the father of Katharine Maud Edwards-Heathcote, mother of Oswald Mosley, the founder of the British Union of Fascists, who lived for a time at Apedale Hall.

Parliament of the United Kingdom
Preceded by Edward Ellice; Peter Moore	Member of Parliament for Coventry; 1826–1830; With: Thomas Bilcliffe Fyler	Succeeded by Edward Ellice; Thomas Bilcliffe Fyler
