= William Anstruther-Gray =

William Anstruther-Gray may refer to:

- William Anstruther-Gray (St Andrews MP) (1859–1938), Scottish Unionist MP for St Andrews
- William Anstruther-Gray, Baron Kilmany (1905–1985), Scottish Unionist MP for Lanarkshire North, then Berwick & East Lothian
