= Lady Hannah Ellice (1812 ship) =

History

United Kingdom
- Name: Lady Hannah Ellice
- Namesake: Wife of Edward "Bear" Ellice
- Builder: Edward Adams, Bucklers Hard, Hampshire
- Launched: 13 April 1812
- Fate: Wrecked 27 August 1838

General characteristics
- Tons burthen: 341, or 350 (bm)
- Length: 106 ft 5 in (32.4 m)
- Beam: 26 ft 6 in (8.1 m)
- Armament: 12 × 9-pounder carronades

Lady Hannah Ellice (or Lady Hannah Ellis) was launched in 1812 as a West Indiaman. Later, she traded more widely, including making two voyages to India under a license from the British East India Company. She survived two maritime misadventures but suffered a final wrecking in August 1838.

== Career ==
Lady Hannah Ellis first appeared in Lloyd's Register (LR) in 1812 with Lawton, master, Chalmers & Co. owners, and trade London–West Indies

Year	Master	Owner	Trade	Source
1816	R.Garrick	Chalmers & Co.	London–Saint Lucia	LR

A dreadful hurricane on 21 October 1817 devastated the harbour of Castries, Saint Lucia, and drove Lady Hannah Ellice, and 11 other vessels on shore. It was expected that she would be got off without much damage. (Note: In July 1997, St.Lucia issued a set of four stamps commemorating maritime incidents at or near the island. The $2.50 value stamp commemorates the 1817 hurricane. One source infers that the vessel on the stamp is Lady Hannah Ellice.)

Year	Master	Owner	Trade	Source & notes
1818	Hutchinson; Urquhardt	Chalmers	London–Saint Lucia	LR; damages and good repair 1818
1820	Urquhardt	Joad	London–Jamaica	LR; damages and good repair 1818
1825	J.Liddle	Marquardt	Greenock-Miramichi, New Brunswick	LR; good repairs 1818 & 1819

On 3 November 1825, a gale at Milford Haven drove Lady Hannah Ellice into the lazaretto and other vessels under quarantine; she lost her bowsprit, foremast, and head. She then ran aground on the mudflats near the dockyard. She was on a voyage from Alexandria, Egypt to London.

Sailed from Bombay on 12 June 1828 and arrived in the Downs end-September 1828.

On 23 December 1828, Lady Hannah Ellice sailed for Bengal from Gravesend, but she sprang a leak and had to return on 28 December. She arrived at Bengal on 1 June 1829. She sailed from Calcutta on 6 August and Saugor on 17 August.

Year	Master	Owner	Trade	Source & notes
1830	J.Liddle	M'Farland	London–Calcutta	LR; good repairs 1818 & 1819, & damages and good repair 1827
1835	J.Liddell	M'Farland	Liverpool–Virginia	LR; homeport Alloa, large repair 1833

== Fate ==
Lady Hannah Ellice was wrecked on 27 August 1838, on The Triangles. (Note: The Triangles 18.313890°N 64.916559°W, are rocks between Green Cay and the harbour at Saint Thomas, U.S. Virgin Islands.) She was on a voyage from British Honduras to London.
