= Charles Grey, 1st Earl Grey =

British Army officer and colonial administrator (1729–1807)

Lieutenant General The Right Honourable The Earl Grey KB PC
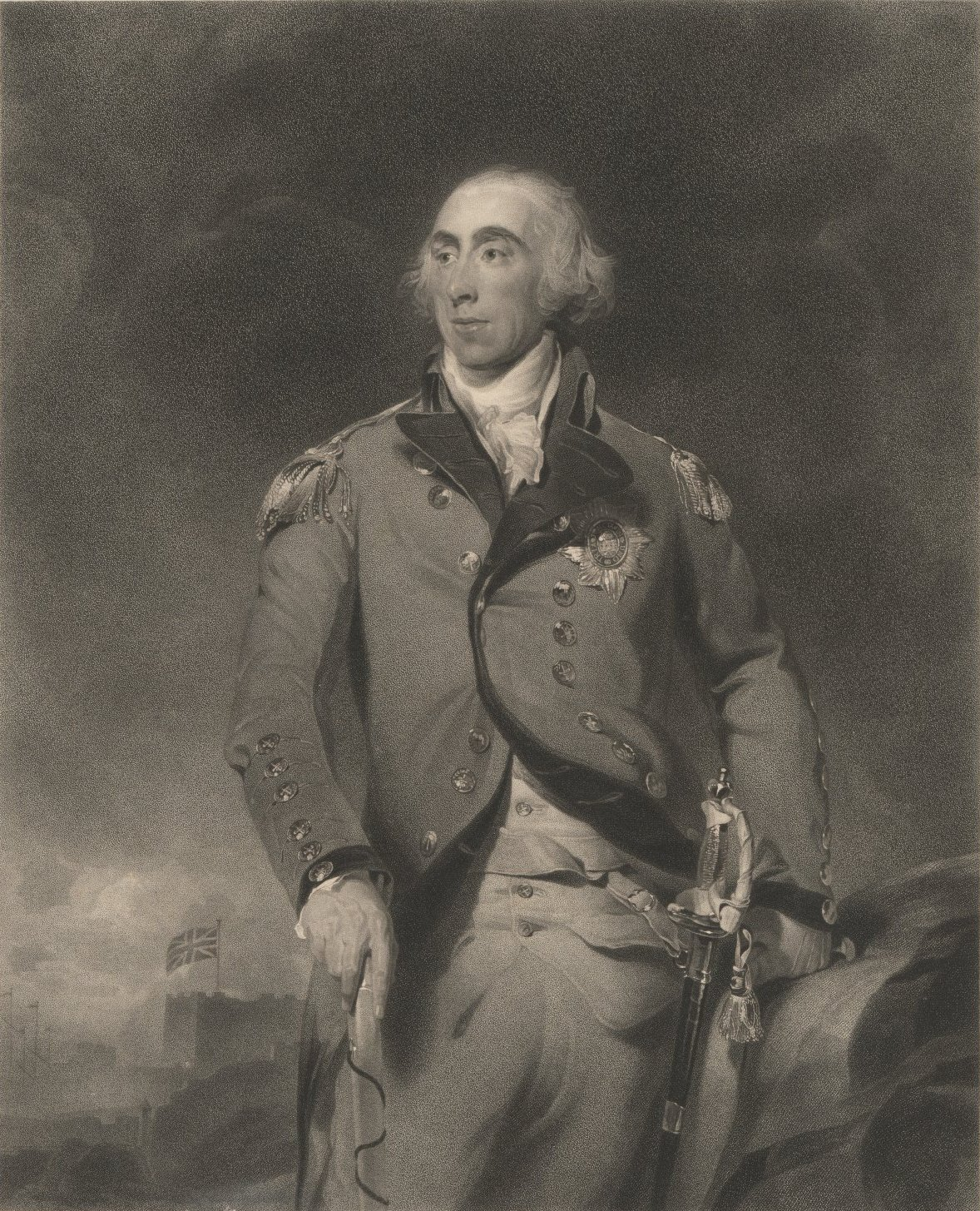
- Engraving by Joseph Collyer after a portrait by Sir Thomas Lawrence, 1797
- Born: 23 October 1729; Northumberland, England
- Died: 14 November 1807 (aged 78)
- Relatives: Charles Grey, 2nd Earl Grey (son); George Grey, 1st Baronet (son)
- Military career
- Allegiance: Great Britain
- Branch: British Army
- Service years: 1744–1799
- Rank: Lieutenant-general
- Nickname: No-Flint Grey
- Conflicts: Jacobite rising of 1745; Seven Years' War; Raid on Rochefort; West German Campaign; Capture of Belle Île; Siege of Havana; Spanish invasion of Portugal (1762); American War of Independence; Philadelphia campaign; Battle of Paoli; Grey's raid; French Revolutionary Wars
- Awards: KB
- Other work: Governor of Guernsey

Lieutenant-General Charles Grey, 1st Earl Grey, KB, PC (c. 23 October 1729 – 14 November 1807) was a British Army officer and colonial administrator. He served in the American War of Independence, rising to Commander-in-Chief, North America. Following the Battle of Paoli in 1777, Grey became known as "No-Flint Grey" for reportedly ordering his men to extract the flints from their muskets during a night approach and to fight with bayonets only. In 1782, he was promoted to lieutenant general and appointed as Commander-in-Chief, North America. Grey subsequently served in the French Revolutionary Wars, leading the capture of Martinique and Guadeloupe in 1794. He served as the governor of Guernsey from 1797 until his death in 1807.

== Early life ==
Grey was born at his family estate Howick Hall, 30 miles north of Newcastle upon Tyne and one mile from the North Sea. His exact birthdate is unknown, but he was baptised 23 October 1729, so he was probably born in October. He was the third son of Sir Henry Grey, 1st Baronet, of Howick and his wife Lady Hannah Grey (née Wood), daughter of Thomas Wood of Fallodon in Northumberland. Because he had two older brothers, Grey did not expect to inherit his father's titles and estates, so he pursued a career in the army. His two older brothers Sir Henry and Thomas both died without issue, leaving him as the viable heir.

== Military career ==
In 1744, with financial assistance from his father, Grey purchased a commission as an ensign in the 6th Regiment of Foot. He soon went to Scotland with the Sixth Regiment to suppress the Jacobite Rising of 1745. Following victory there, the Sixth Regiment spent the next few years in Gibraltar. In December 1752, he purchased a lieutenancy in the Sixth Regiment. In March 1755, he formed a new independent company and became their captain. Two months later, he purchased a captaincy in the 20th Regiment of Foot (subsequently titled 'East Devonshire Regiment', and in 1881 the Lancashire Fusiliers), in which James Wolfe served as lieutenant colonel. In 1757, while with Wolfe's regiment, he participated in the unsuccessful attack on Rochefort.

=== Seven Years' War ===
In the Seven Years' War, he served as adjutant in the staff of Duke Ferdinand of Brunswick and on 1 August 1759 was wounded at Minden. On 14 October 1760 he commanded a Light Company at the Battle of Campen, where he was again wounded. One year later, as Lt. Colonel of the 98th Regiment of Foot (1761), he participated in the Capture of Belle Île, off the coast of Brittany. Next, he served at the Battle of Havana in 1762. Later, he was on the staff of Wilhelm, Count of Schaumburg-Lippe during the Spanish invasion of Portugal (1762). In 1763 he retired on half-pay, but in 1772 he received a promotion to Colonel and served as aide-de-camp to King George III.

=== American War of Independence ===
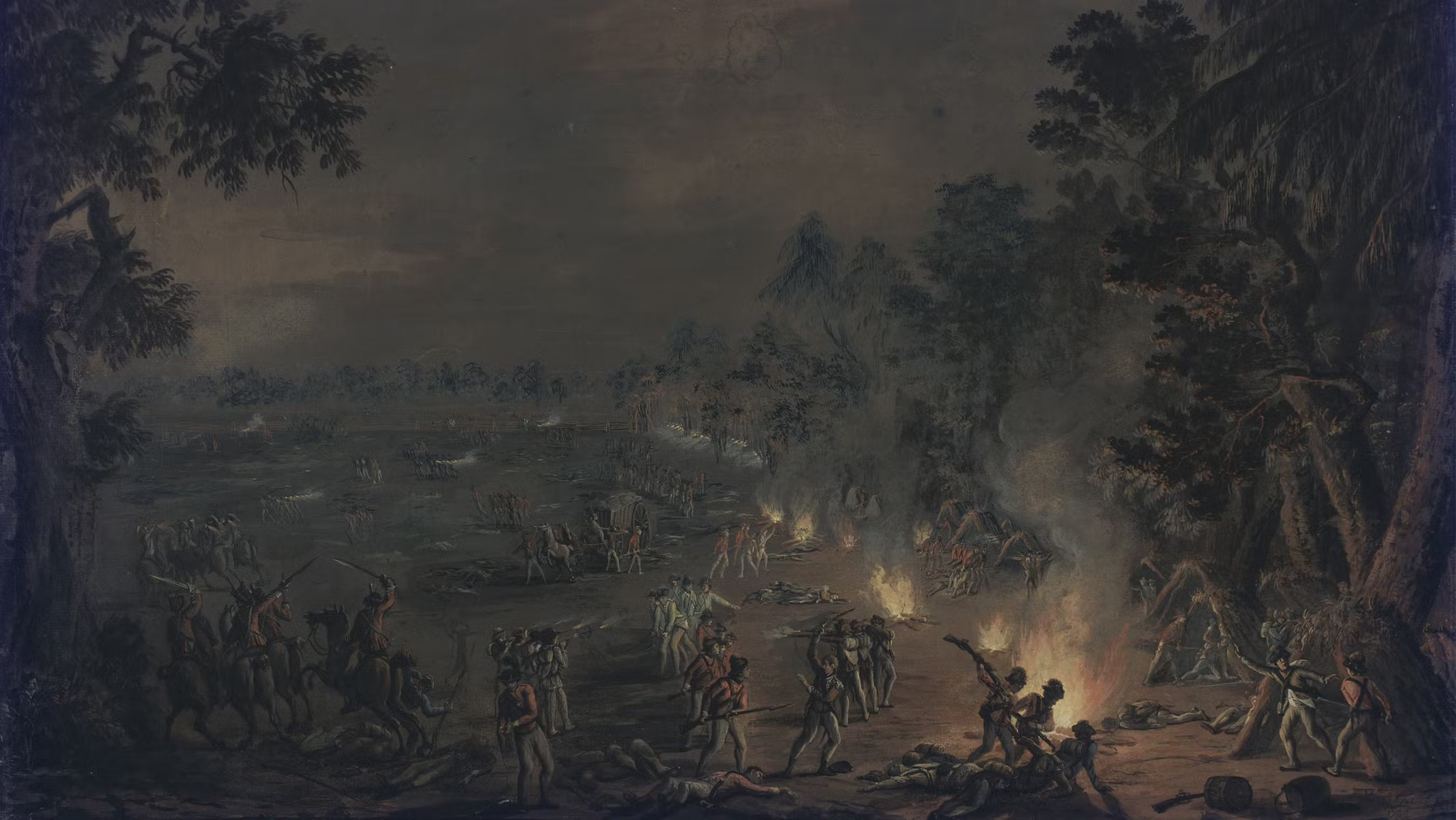
The Battle of Paoli, where Grey won a victory by ordering his men to use bayonets

During the American War of Independence he was one of the more successful British army leaders. He was rapidly promoted, becoming a major general in 1777 and commanded the 3rd Brigade at the Battle of Brandywine. He earned the nickname "No-Flint Grey" after the Battle of Paoli in the same campaign when, to ensure surprise in the night attack on an American encampment, it was said he ordered the infantry of his command to remove the flints from their muskets and use only their bayonets. In fact, he only directed that muskets should be unloaded.

He commanded the 3rd Brigade again at the Battle of Germantown and the Battle of Monmouth. After U.S. General Charles Lee retreated at the Battle of Monmouth, he sought to avoid criticism by complaining that he had been fighting the advance of Grey's 3rd brigade, suggesting the Earl was a feared and respected opponent by this stage in the war.

Grey led raids at New Bedford on 5–6 September 1778, destroying nearly all the shipping and burning twenty shops and twenty-two houses in the town, and raids on Martha's Vineyard, where between 10 and 15 September, a raiding force under Grey carried off all the sheep, swine, cattle and oxen that they could find with promise of payment in New York City. On 27 September 1778, Grey used the same methods as he had at Paoli in a night attack against American troops at Old Tappan, New Jersey which came to be known as the Baylor Massacre.

He was recalled to England and became a knight of the Order of the Bath and a lieutenant general. He later was appointed commander-in-chief of the British troops in America, but hostilities ended before he could take command.

=== French Revolutionary Wars ===
At the outset of the French Revolutionary Wars in 1793, Sir Charles Grey was appointed commander of the West Indian expedition. First, however, he went to Ostend to participate in the relief of Nieuwpoort, Belgium.

In early 1794, he and Admiral Sir John Jervis led a British force to capture Martinique. The campaign lasted about six weeks with British forces capturing Fort Royal and Fort Saint Louis on 22 March, and Fort Bourbon two days later. British forces then occupied Martinique until the Treaty of Amiens returned the island to the French in 1802.

Grey was later involved in the invasion of Guadeloupe. Between the years of 1797 and 1807 General Grey held the position of governor of Guernsey.

== Peerage ==
In late 1794, he returned to England. From 1798 to 1799 he served as Commander of the Southern District, retiring in 1799. In acknowledgment of his service, he was raised in January 1801 to the peerage as Baron Grey, of Howick in the County of Northumberland. In 1806, he was created Earl Grey and Viscount Howick, in the County of Northumberland. He died the next year, at the age of 78.

== Family ==
He married Elizabeth Grey (1744–1822), daughter of George Grey of Southwick (1713–1746). Their children were:

- Charles Grey, 2nd Earl Grey (1764–1845), Prime Minister of the United Kingdom and abolisher of slavery, who married Mary Elizabeth Ponsonby.
- Sir George Grey, 1st Baronet (1767–1828), Master and Commander of the Mediterranean Fleet, Flag Captain of King George III's Royal Yacht (1801–04), who married Mary Whitbread, daughter of Samuel Whitbread (1720–1796).
- Sir Henry George Grey (1766–1845), Colonel in the 13th Light Dragoons, who married Charlotte Des Voeux (1789–1882).
- Lady Elizabeth Grey (1765–1846), who married Samuel Whitbread MP.
- Lt. Col. William Grey (1777–1817), who married Maria Shirreff.
- Edward Grey (1782–1837), Bishop of Hereford, married firstly Charlotte Elizabeth Croft, secondly Elizabeth Adair, and thirdly Eliza Innes.
- Lady Hannah Althea Grey (1785–1832), who married firstly George Edmund Byron Bettesworth and secondly Edward Ellice MP.

Grey and his wife brought up Eliza Courtney, the child their son Charles had with the married Duchess of Devonshire in 1792.

== Arms ==
Coat of arms of Charles Grey, 1st Earl Grey
Crest A scaling ladder or, hooked and pointed sable. Escutcheon Gules, a lion rampant, within a bordure engrailed, argent, in dexter chief point a mullet or. Supporters Dexter, a lion guardant purpure, ducally crowned or; sinister, a tiger guardant, proper. Motto De bon vouloir servir le roy (To serve the king with good will). Orders The Most Honourable Order of the Bath - Knight Companion (KB).

== Sources ==
- Fredriksen, John C. (2001). America's Military Adversaries: From Colonial Times to the Present. (ABC-CLIO).
- De Garis, Marie (1995). History of St Pierre du Bois (PDF). Archived from the original (PDF) on 15 April 2012.

Military offices
New title Regiment raised	Lieutenant-Colonel Commandant of the 98th Regiment of Foot; 1761–1763	Regiment disbanded
Preceded by Thomas Erle	Colonel of the 28th (North Gloucestershire) Regiment of Foot; 1777–1787	Succeeded by James Patterson
Preceded by John Severne	Colonel of the 8th (The King's Royal Irish) Regiment of (Light) Dragoons; 1787–1789	Succeeded by Francis Lascelles
Preceded by Studholme Hodgson	Colonel of the 7th (The Princess Royal's) Dragoon Guards; 1789–1795	Succeeded by Sir Ralph Abercromby
Preceded by Thomas Bruce	Commander-in-Chief, Windward and Leeward Islands; 1793–1795	Succeeded by Sir Ralph Abercromby
Preceded by George Sandford; Lieutenant-Colonel Commandant	Colonel of the 20th Regiment of (Light) Dragoons; 1795–1797	Succeeded by The Lord Heathfield
Preceded by Francis Lascelles	Colonel of the 8th (The King's Royal Irish) Regiment of (Light) Dragoons; 1797–1799	Succeeded by Sir Robert Laurie, Bt
Preceded by The Lord Amherst	Governor of Guernsey; 1797–1807	Succeeded by The Earl of Pembroke
Preceded by Francis Lascelles	Colonel of the 3rd (The King's Own) Regiment of Dragoons; 1799–1807	Succeeded by William Cartwright
Peerage of the United Kingdom
New creation	Earl Grey; 1806–1807	Succeeded by Charles Grey
New creation	Baron Grey; 1801–1807	Succeeded by Charles Grey
