= Jean Helen St. Clair Campbell =

Jean Helen St. Clair Campbell CBE
- Jean Helen St. Clair Campbell, Lady Stratheden and Campbell from a 1951 newspaper

Girl Guide Chief Commissioner for the British Commonwealth

Personal details
- Born: 1902 Edinburgh, Scotland
- Died: 9 August 1956 (aged 53–54) Edinburgh, Scotland

Jean Helen St. Clair Campbell, Lady Stratheden and Campbell CBE (?–9 August 1956) served as the Girl Guide Chief Commissioner for the British Commonwealth. She was a recipient of the Silver Fish Award, the highest adult award in Girlguiding, awarded for outstanding service to Girlguiding combined with service to world Guiding.

== Life ==
Born in 1902 in Edinburgh, Scotland as Jean Helen St. Clair Anstruther-Gray she was the daughter of William Anstruther-Gray and Claire Jessie Tennant. In 1923 she married Brigadier Alistair Campbell, 4th Baron Stratheden and Campbell and they had three daughters.

From 1948 until she retired due to ill-health in 1956, Campbell was Chief Commissioner of Girl Guides Association. She was appointed a Commander of the Order of the British Empire (CBE) in 1954.

== Death ==
Campbell died on 9 August 1956 at an Edinburgh nursing home.
