= Charles Ellice =

British Army general

General Sir Charles Ellice GCB
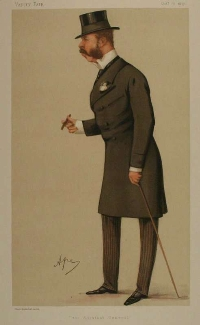
- General Sir Charles Ellice
- Born: 10 May 1823; Florence, Italy
- Died: 12 November 1888 (aged 65); Horringer, Bury St Edmunds, England
- Military career
- Allegiance: United Kingdom
- Branch: British Army
- Rank: General
- Units: Coldstream Guards; 82nd foot 24th foot 49th (Princess of Wales Hertfordshire) Regiment
- Commands: South-Eastern District
- Conflicts: Indian Mutiny; Battle of Jhelum
- Awards: Knight Grand Cross of the Order of the Bath; Indian Mutiny Medal
- Spouse: Louisa Lambton (m. 1862)
- Children: 1
- Parents: Robert Ellice (father); Eliza Courtney (mother)
- Relatives: Edward Ellice (uncle); William Henry Lambton (father-in-law); Henry Brand (son-in-law)

General Sir Charles Henry Ellice GCB (10 May 1823 – 12 November 1888) was a former Adjutant-General to the Forces.

== Life ==
He was born in Florence on 10 May 1823, and was the second son of General Robert Ellice, the brother of the Right Hon. Edward Ellice, secretary at war, and Eliza Courtney.

== Military career ==
Having passed through Sandhurst, Charles Ellice was commissioned into the Coldstream Guards on 10 May 1839. He served in Canada in 1840–2, and became lieutenant and captain on 8 August 1845. He exchanged to the 82nd foot on 20 March 1846, and to the 24th foot, of which his father was colonel, on 3 April. He went with that regiment to India in May, but was aide-de-camp to his father (commanding the troops in Malta) from 17 March 1848 to 3 March 1849, and so missed the second Sikh war. He was promoted major on 21 December 1849, and lieutenant-colonel on 8 August 1851. On 28 November 1854 he became colonel in the army.

The 24th was at Peshawar when the Indian Mutiny broke out. On 4 July 1857, Ellice was sent to Jhelum with three companies of it, some native cavalry, and three guns, to disarm the 14th Bengal native infantry and other troops. He arrived and rode ahead to discuss the disarming of the garrison with their British Commander and made preparation for it to be carried out the following day whilst the 14th Bengal Native Infantry were on parade. The 14th mutinied on sighting Ellice's forces on the morning of the 7th and he attacked and routed them during what became known as the Battle of Jhelum. He was dangerously wounded in the neck, right shoulder, and leg leading a charge to break through the enemy lines. He was mentioned in despatches, received the medal, and was appointed a Companion of the Order of the Bath on 1 January 1858.

On 3 June 1858, he was given the command of the second battalion of the 24th, which he raised. He went with it to Mauritius in March 1860 but exchanged to half-pay on 8 July 1862. On 25 May 1863, he was appointed to a brigade in the Dublin district; on 8 March 1864 he was transferred to Dover, and from 1 September 1867 to 30 June 1868 he commanded the South-Eastern District. He was promoted major-general on 23 March 1865, lieutenant-general on 28 September 1873, and general on 1 October 1877.

He went on to become Quartermaster-General to the Forces in 1871, and in 1876 was appointed Adjutant-General to the Forces. In this role he advised the Government that the defeat at the Battle of Isandlwana of 1879 had arisen because they had underestimated the military capability of the Zulus. In the latter capacity, he carried on correspondence in 1877–8 with the governors of Wellington College, in which he represented the view of many officers of the army that the college was being diverted from its original purpose. The correspondence was published, and a commission of inquiry followed. He left the post of Adjutant-General in 1882, and retired in 1887.

He was also Colonel of the 49th (Princess of Wales Hertfordshire) Regiment (1874–1881) and the South Wales Borderers from 6 April 1884 until he died in 1888.

He lived at 12 South Audley Street in London. He died at Brook House, Horringer, Bury St Edmunds on 12 November 1888.

Military offices
Preceded by William McCleverty	GOC South-Eastern District; 1867–1868	Succeeded by Sir David Russell
Preceded by Sir Frederick Haines	Quartermaster-General to the Forces; 1871–1876	Succeeded by Sir Daniel Lysons
Preceded by Sir Richard Airey	Adjutant General; 1876–1882	Succeeded by The Lord Wolseley
Preceded by Pringle Taylor	Colonel of the South Wales Borderers; 1884–1888	Succeeded by Edmund Wodehouse
Preceded by Thomas James Galloway	Colonel of the 49th (Princess of Wales Hertfordshire) Regiment; 1874–1881	Succeeded by Amalgamated to form Princess Charlotte of Wales's (Royal Berkshire Regiment)
