= Russell Ellice =

British businessman (1799 –1873)

- Born: 6 June 1799; Bath, Somerset
- Died: 15 September 1873 (aged 74)
- Spouse: Harriet Chaplin (m. 1826)
- Parents: Alexander Ellice (father); Ann Russell (mother)
- Relatives: Edward Ellice (brother); Alexander Ellice (brother); Robert Ellice (brother); General Sir Charles Ellice (nephew); Edward Ellice, Jr. (nephew)

Russell Ellice (6 June 1799 – 15 September 1873) was a British businessman who was Chairman of the East India Company and one of the first Directors of the British American Land Company. Ellice was also a Director of the first New Zealand Company and also the second New Zealand Company Ellice was also a Governor of North American Colonial Association of Ireland and subsequently Chairman.

== Personal life ==
Russell Ellice was born in 1799 in Bath, Somerset, the fifth son of Scottish parents Alexander Ellice and Ann Russell. He was baptised 2 July 1799 at St Mary's Church in Bathwick. He was one of 10 children; He was the younger brother of merchant Edward Ellice. Russell Ellice lived at Brickendonbury Manor in Hertfordshire, where he died on 15 September 1873. Ellice was married to Harriet Chaplin on 21 July 1826 in London. Harriet died in Hertfordshire in 1882.

Ellice was a slave-owner, the absentee owner of several West Indian sugar plantations. He was awarded £8000 compensation by the British government when it abolished slavery. Ellice Street in Wellington, New Zealand, is named after him.

== Career ==
In 1825 Ellice was a director of the New Zealand Company, a venture chaired by the wealthy John George Lambton, Whig MP (and later 1st Earl of Durham), that made the first attempt to colonise New Zealand. Edward Ellice was also on the board.

In 1832 Ellice, together with Nathaniel Gould, was responsible for the largest land deal in Lower Canada, when the British Government sold, for £110,321, over one million acres in the Eastern Townships to the British American Land Company, of which Ellice was a director. Edward Ellice was one of the promoters of the company.

Ellice was involved with the British Bank of North America and attended their second meeting of directors. Ellice was also Chairman of Cooper [Copper?] Mines of Combe Association.

In 1831, Ellice was elected a director to the Court of the East India Company and in 1854 was elected Chairman.

In a number of the schemes which Russell Ellice had an interest in, Edward Ellice's name featured also. Russell Ellice was a Director of the first New Zealand Company and also the second New Zealand Company. In the latter company Edward Ellice is also a Director, as is Edward Gibbon Wakefield.

Ellice was also a Governor of the North American Colonial Association of Ireland and subsequently its Chairman. Edward Gibbon Wakefield was also a director of this organisation, to which Edward Ellice sold the Seigneury of Beauharnois. The latter subsequently had to buy back the land in order to save his investment.

The two Ellice brothers had commercial control at different times, of a significant amount of the world. Russell Ellice as Chairman of the East India Company, was responsible for nearly a fifth of the world's population covering approximately a million square miles of the Indian sub-continent. The British American Land Company, of which he was a Director, had in excess of a million acres of land, whilst Edward Ellice, Lower Canada's largest absentee landowner, was also a Director of the Hudson's Bay Company, which owned over three million square miles of North America.
