= Henry Torrens Anstruther =

British politician

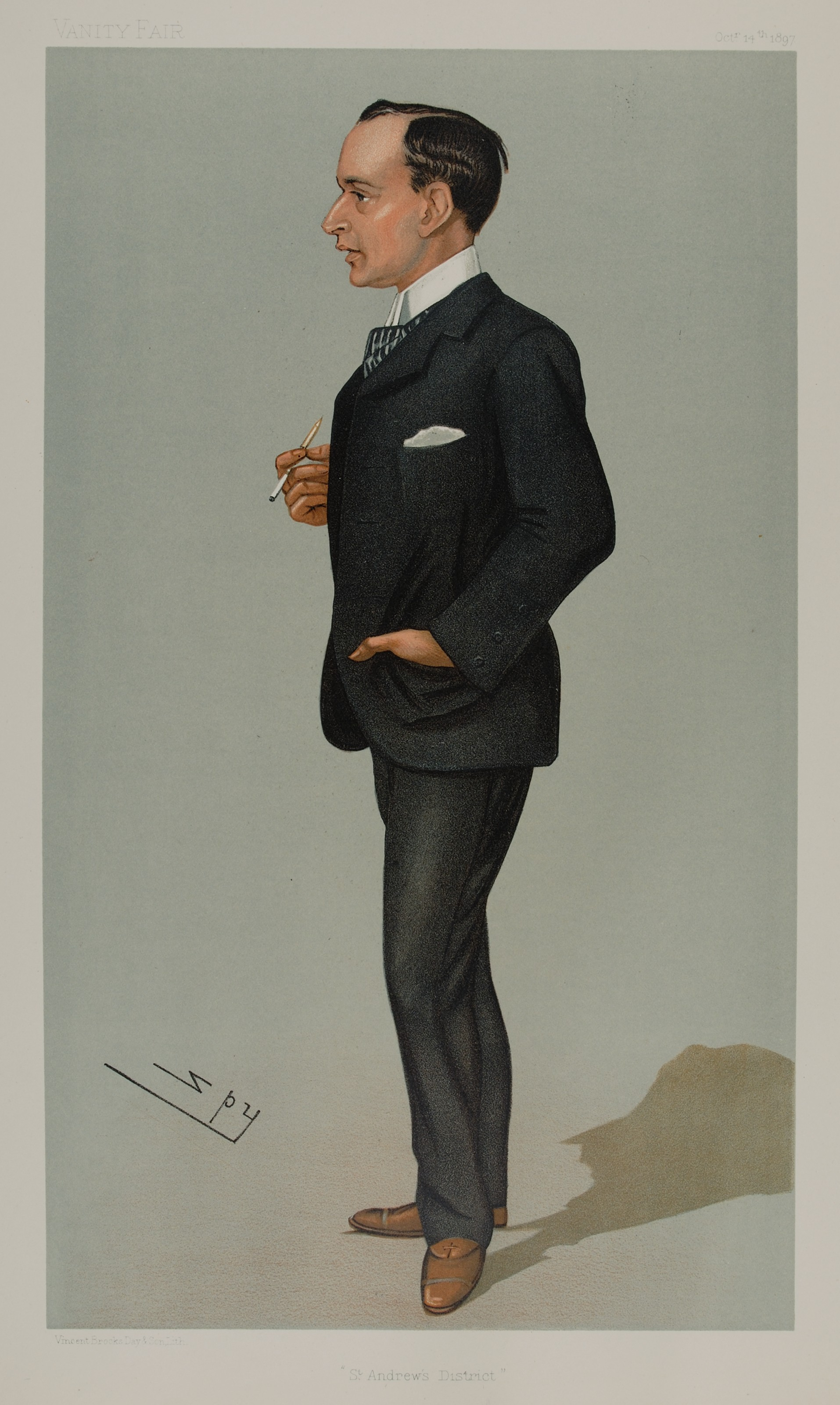
"St Andrew's District" Anstruther as caricatured by Spy (Leslie Ward) in Vanity Fair, October 1897

Henry Torrens Anstruther (27 November 1860 – 5 April 1926) was a Scottish Liberal Unionist politician.

== Biography ==
The second son of Sir Robert Anstruther, 5th Baronet MP, he was educated at Eton College and the University of Edinburgh. He became an advocate in Edinburgh in 1884, and was Liberal Unionist Member of Parliament for St Andrews Burghs from 1886–1903 in succession to his father. He served in government as a Lord of the Treasury from 1895–1903.

He was a justice of the peace for Buckinghamshire and Fife, and from 1903 he was a member of the Administrative Council of the Suez Canal Company. He was an Alderman on London County Council from 1905–1910. With his wife, the writer Eva Anstruther, whom he divorced in 1915, he was father of the writer Joyce Anstruther, better-known via her pen-name of Jan Struther.

== Sources ==
- Leigh Rayment's Historical List of MPs
- Image, npg.org.uk. Accessed 22 November 2022.

Parliament of the United Kingdom
Preceded by Sir Robert Anstruther, 5th Bt.	Member for St Andrews Burghs; 1886–1903	Succeeded by Edward Charles Ellice
