= William Anstruther-Gray (St Andrews MP) =

Lieut-Colonel William Anstruther-Gray
- Born: 6 September 1859
- Died: 17 April 1938 (aged 78)
- Relatives: Son of Colonel John Anstruther-Thomson of Charleton
- Military career
- Allegiance: United Kingdom
- Branch: British Army
- Rank: Lieutenant-Colonel
- Units: Militia's Fife Artillery, 13th Hussars, Royal Horse Guards, Scottish Horse
- Commands: 3rd Line of Scottish Horse
- Conflicts: India and Afghanistan in 1880–1881; South Africa 1901–1902
- Other work: Liberal Unionist, then Unionist Politician

Lieutenant-Colonel William Anstruther-Gray, FSA, JP, DL (6 September 1859 – 17 April 1938) was a Scottish soldier and politician.

== Biography ==
The son of Colonel John Anstruther-Thomson of Charleton, Colinsburgh, Fife, and Maria Hamilton Gray of Carntyne, Glasgow, he was educated at Eton.

He adopted name of Gray on succeeding to the Carntyne estate in 1904.

He joined the part-time Fifeshire Artillery Militia as a Sub-Lieutenant (Supernumerary) on 16 December 1876. He served for four years until he was commissioned into the 13th Hussars as a second lieutenant in 1880, served in India and Afghanistan in 1880-1881 and was promoted to lieutenant on 1 July 1881, before transferring to the Royal Horse Guards in 1885. He was Aide-de-Camp to the Earl of Kintore, Governor of South Australia, from 1889 to 1891, was promoted to captain on 30 December 1893, and to major on 1 May 1897. He served in South Africa from 1901 to 1902 where he was commandant of the district of Knysna in 1901, and Inspector of Concentration Camps in Transvaal in 1902. Following the end of the war in June 1902, he returned to the United Kingdom in the SS Dunottar Castle, which arrived at Southampton in July 1902. He retired from the army in January 1903.

Anstruther-Gray later commanded 3rd Line Group, Scottish Horse during World War I.

He was unsuccessful candidate for St Andrews Burghs in the September 1903 by-election, but won and represented that constituency as a Liberal Unionist (beginning in 1912 Unionist) from 1906-January 1910 and from December 1910–1918.

== Family ==
He married Clayre Tennant CBE JP, daughter of Andrew Tennant of Essenside on 26 January 1891 at St. Peter's Church, Glenelg, South Australia. They had one son, William John St Clair Anstruther-Gray, and one daughter Jean Helen St. Clair Campbell.

Parliament of the United Kingdom
Preceded by Edward Charles Ellice	Member for St Andrews Burghs; 1906–1910	Succeeded by James Duncan Millar
Preceded by James Duncan Millar	Member for St Andrews Burghs; 1910–1918	Constituency abolished
