= St Andrews Burghs =

Parliamentary constituency in the United Kingdom, 1832–1918

Coordinates: 56.285°N 3.019°W

- Former district of Burghs constituency for the House of Commons
- Subdivision: Fife

1832–1918
- Seats: One
- Created from: Perth Burghs and Anstruther Burghs
- Replaced by: East Fife

St Andrews Burghs was a district of burghs constituency, representing various burghs of Fife, Scotland, in the House of Commons of the Parliament of the United Kingdom, from 1832 to 1918.

== Boundaries ==
The constituency comprised the burghs of St Andrews, Anstruther Easter, Anstruther Wester, Crail, Cupar, Kilrenny and Pittenweem, all in the county of Fife. St Andrews and Cupar had previously been part of Perth Burghs, and the other burghs part of Anstruther Burghs.

In 1918 the constituency was abolished, and the burghs were thereafter represented as part of the East Fife constituency.

== Members of Parliament ==
Year	Member	Party
1832	Andrew Johnston	Whig
1837	Edward Ellice	Whig
1859	Edward Ellice	Liberal
1880	Stephen Williamson	Liberal
1885	Sir Robert Anstruther	Independent Liberal
1886	Sir Robert Anstruther	Liberal Unionist
1886	Henry Torrens Anstruther	Liberal Unionist
1903	Edward Charles Ellice	Liberal
1906	William Anstruther-Gray	Liberal Unionist
1910	James Duncan Millar	Liberal
1910	William Anstruther-Gray	Liberal Unionist
1912	William Anstruther-Gray	Unionist
1918	constituency abolished	

== Election results ==
=== Elections in the 1830s ===
General election 1832: St Andrews Burghs
Party	Candidate	Votes	%
Whig	Andrew Johnston	331	62.3
Tory	Sir Ralph Abercromby Anstruther, 4th Baronet	200	37.7
Majority		131	24.6
Turnout		531	85.5
Registered electors		621	
Whig win (new seat)			

General election 1835: St Andrews Burghs
Party	Candidate	Votes	%
Whig	Andrew Johnston	Unopposed	
Registered electors		669	
Whig hold			

General election 1837: St Andrews Burghs
Party	Candidate	Votes	%
Whig	Edward Ellice	290	52.6
Conservative	David Maitland Makgill	261	47.4
Majority		29	5.2
Turnout		551	79.4
Registered electors		694	
Whig hold			

=== Elections in the 1840s ===
General election 1841: St Andrews Burghs
Party	Candidate	Votes	%	±%
Whig	Edward Ellice	366	58.7	+6.1
Conservative	George Makgill	258	41.3	−6.1
Majority		108	17.4	+12.2
Turnout		624	74.7	−4.7
Registered electors		835		
Whig hold		Swing	+6.1	

General election 1847: St Andrews Burghs
Party	Candidate	Votes	%	±%
Whig	Edward Ellice	Unopposed		
Registered electors		768		
Whig hold				

=== Elections in the 1850s ===
General election 1852: St Andrews Burghs
Party	Candidate	Votes	%	±%
Whig	Edward Ellice	Unopposed		
Registered electors		680		
Whig hold				

General election 1857: St Andrews Burghs
Party	Candidate	Votes	%	±%
Whig	Edward Ellice	357	63.9	N/A
Peelite	Francis Brown Douglas	202	36.1	N/A
Majority		155	27.8	N/A
Turnout		559	78.3	N/A
Registered electors		714		
Whig hold		Swing	N/A	

General election 1859: St Andrews Burghs
Party	Candidate	Votes	%	±%
Liberal	Edward Ellice	Unopposed		
Registered electors		742		
Liberal hold				

=== Elections in the 1860s ===
General election 1865: St Andrews Burghs
Party	Candidate	Votes	%	±%
Liberal	Edward Ellice	Unopposed		
Registered electors		839		
Liberal hold				

General election 1868: St Andrews Burghs
Party	Candidate	Votes	%	±%
Liberal	Edward Ellice	Unopposed		
Registered electors		1,847		
Liberal hold				

=== Elections in the 1870s ===
General election 1874: St Andrews Burghs
Party	Candidate	Votes	%	±%
Liberal	Edward Ellice	Unopposed		
Registered electors		2,108		
Liberal hold				

=== Elections in the 1880s ===
General election 1880: St Andrews Burghs
Party	Candidate	Votes	%	±%
Liberal	Stephen Williamson	1,258	58.5	N/A
Liberal	James Lindsay Bennet	892	41.5	N/A
Majority		366	17.0	N/A
Turnout		2,150	84.6	N/A
Registered electors		2,542		
Liberal hold		Swing	N/A	

General election 1885: St Andrews Burghs
Party	Candidate	Votes	%	±%
Independent Liberal	Robert Anstruther	1,257	50.0	N/A
Liberal	Stephen Williamson	1,255	50.0	−8.5
Majority		2	0.0	N/A
Turnout		2,512	88.5	+0.9
Registered electors		2,837		
Independent Liberal gain from Liberal		Swing		

The original count put the two 1885 candidates at 1,256 votes and, as the returning officer was not a constituent, he was unable to cast the deciding vote and declared both elected. After scrutiny, Anstruther gained two additional votes and lost one, while Williamson lost one also.

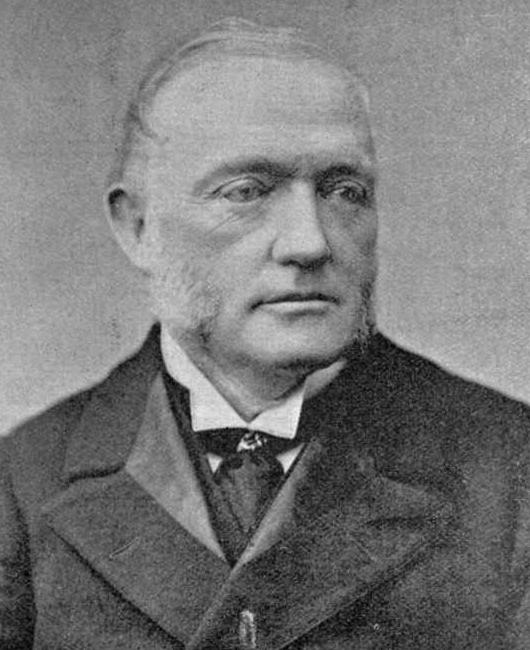
Brassey

General election 1886: St Andrews Burghs
Party	Candidate	Votes	%	±%
Liberal Unionist	Henry Torrens Anstruther	1,132	61.3	N/A
Liberal	Thomas Brassey	716	38.7	−11.3
Majority		416	22.6	N/A
Turnout		1,848	65.1	−23.4
Registered electors		2,837		
Liberal Unionist gain from Independent Liberal		Swing	N/A	

=== Elections in the 1890s ===
General election 1892: St Andrews Burghs
Party	Candidate	Votes	%	±%
Liberal Unionist	Henry Torrens Anstruther	1,066	52.8	−8.5
Liberal	Martin White	954	47.2	+8.5
Majority		112	5.6	−17.0
Turnout		2,020	79.6	+14.5
Registered electors		2,537		
Liberal Unionist hold		Swing	−8.5	

General election 1895: St Andrews Burghs
Party	Candidate	Votes	%	±%
Liberal Unionist	Henry Torrens Anstruther	1,185	54.5	+1.7
Liberal	John Paton	989	45.5	−1.7
Majority		196	9.0	+3.4
Turnout		2,174	81.1	+1.5
Registered electors		2,679		
Liberal Unionist hold		Swing	+1.7	

=== Elections in the 1900s ===
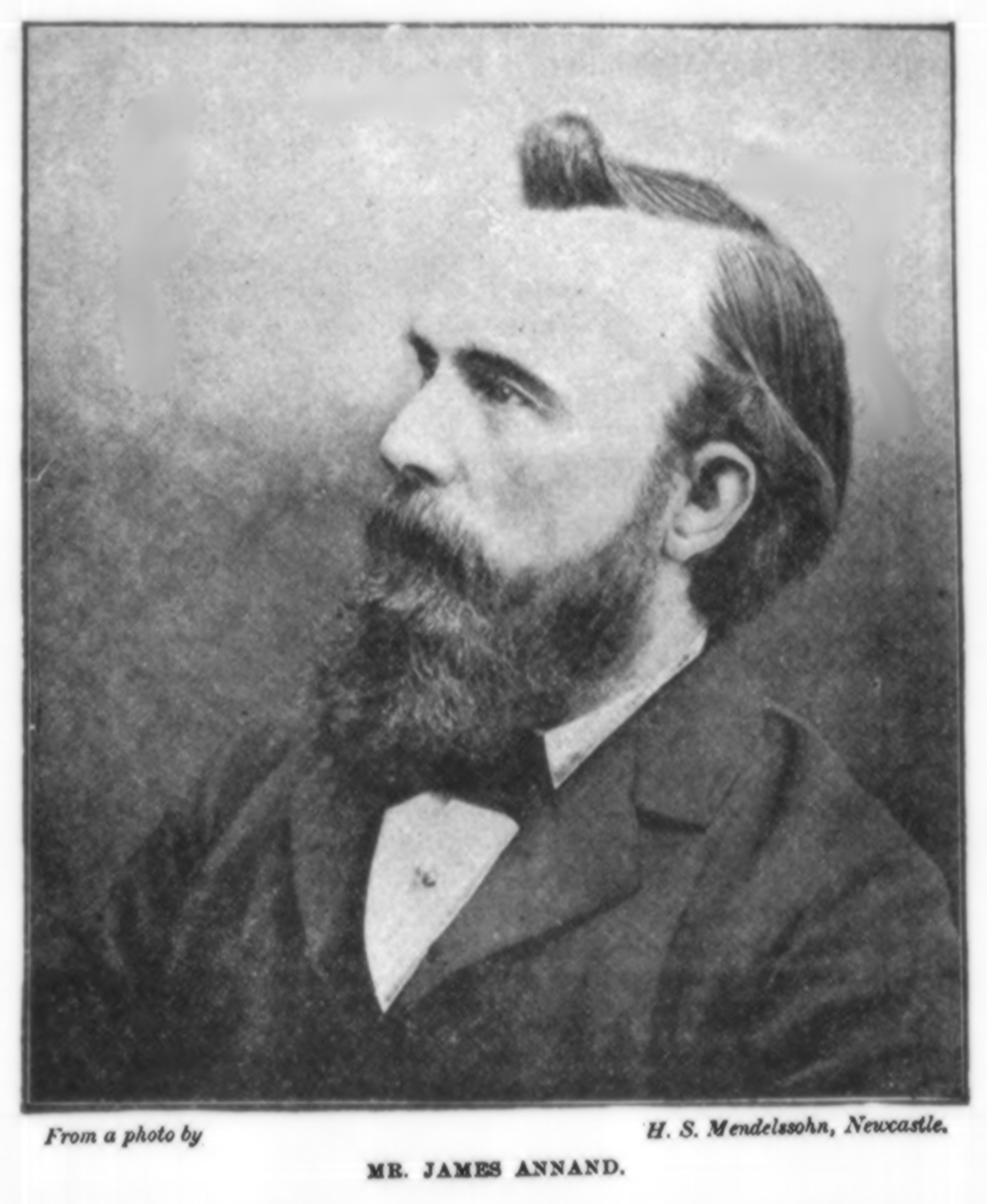
Annand

General election January 1900: St Andrews Burghs
Party	Candidate	Votes	%	±%
Liberal Unionist	Henry Torrens Anstruther	1,148	51.2	−3.3
Liberal	James Annand	1,094	48.8	+3.3
Majority		54	2.4	−6.6
Turnout		2,242	76.0	−5.1
Registered electors		2,951		
Liberal Unionist hold		Swing	−3.3	

1903 St Andrews Burghs by-election
Party	Candidate	Votes	%	±%
Liberal	Edward Ellice	1,324	50.7	+1.9
Liberal Unionist	William Anstruther-Thomson	1,288	49.3	−1.9
Majority		36	1.4	N/A
Turnout		2,612	82.6	+6.6
Registered electors		3,162		
Liberal gain from Liberal Unionist		Swing	+1.9	

General election January 1906: St Andrews Burghs
Party	Candidate	Votes	%	±%
Liberal Unionist	William Anstruther-Gray	1,495	50.4	−0.8
Liberal	Edward Ellice	1,472	49.6	+0.8
Majority		23	0.8	−1.6
Turnout		2,967	91.4	+15.4
Registered electors		3,247		
Liberal Unionist hold		Swing	−0.8	

=== Elections in the 1910s ===
Duncan Millar

General election January 1910: St Andrews Burghs
Party	Candidate	Votes	%	±%
Liberal	James Duncan Millar	1,507	50.6	+1.0
Liberal Unionist	William Anstruther-Gray	1,469	49.4	−1.0
Majority		38	1.2	N/A
Turnout		2,976	92.8	+1.4
Registered electors		3,206		
Liberal gain from Liberal Unionist		Swing	+1.0	

General election December 1910: St Andrews Burghs
Party	Candidate	Votes	%	±%
Liberal Unionist	William Anstruther-Gray	1,675	50.7	+1.3
Liberal	James Duncan Millar	1,626	49.3	−1.3
Majority		49	1.4	N/A
Turnout		3,301	94.8	+2.0
Registered electors		3,481		
Liberal Unionist gain from Liberal		Swing	+1.3	

General election 1914–15:

Another general election was required to take place before the end of 1915. The political parties had been making preparations for an election to take place and by July 1914, the following candidates had been selected;

- Unionist: William Anstruther-Gray
- Liberal: Henry Jackson
