= William Connolly (VC) =

- Born: c. 1816; Liverpool, England
- Died: 31 December 1891 (aged 75); Liverpool
- Burial place: Kirkdale Cemetery, Liverpool
- Military career
- Allegiance: United Kingdom
- Branch: Bengal Army; British Indian Army
- Rank: Gunner
- Unit: Bengal Horse Artillery
- Conflicts: Indian Mutiny
- Awards: Victoria Cross

William Connolly VC (c. 1816 – 31 December 1891) was an English recipient of the Victoria Cross, the highest and most prestigious award for gallantry in the face of the enemy that can be awarded to British and Commonwealth forces.

== Biography ==
William Connolly was born in Liverpool, Lancashire, England c. 1816. No baptism record has been found for him, his birth details and the identity of his parents are unknown.

After working as a stableman, he enlisted as a soldier in the Honourable East India Company on 2 May 1837 at Liverpool. Later that year he sailed on the ship Exmouth to India to serve as a gunner in the Bengal Horse Artillery. He was given a medical discharge in 1859, at the age of 43 years, after 21 years and 3 months service, due to wounds received on 7 July 1857 at Jhelum during the Battle of Jhelum, British India during the Indian Mutiny. He was awarded the VC for his bravery at Jhelum. He was described as having an indifferent character. In physical appearance he was 5 feet 7 inches tall, he had brown hair, brown eyes and a fresh complexion. He returned home to England from India on the ship Alfred.

Back in Liverpool Connolly was now an army pensioner. He lodged with Thomas and Catherine Burrows at 124 Upper Mann Street Toxteth, Liverpool in 1861 and with the Dodd family at 40 Seacombe Street Everton, Liverpool in 1881. Catherine Burrows was formerly Catherine Connolly, so she was probably a relative. Thomas and Catherine were married on 17 December 1848 at St John The Baptist church in Toxteth. Catherine's father, Michael Connolly, was a warehouseman. She was living in Mill Street Toxteth at the time of the marriage.

In 1883 he gave a testimonial that was used in an advertising campaign for a universal remedy called "Eclectica":

ECLECTICA IN DEBILITY, LOSS OF APPETITE, INDIGESTION &c.

52, Conway Street, Everton, Liverpool,
August, 23rd, 1883.

DEAR SIR, I have for a long time suffered from debility, loss of appetite, and indigestion, together with derangement of the functions of the liver. The latter I ascribe to a long residence in India, where I served with my corps, the Horse Artillery, and was present in many battles from the Sikh war to the mutiny of the native troops. During these campaigns I was severely wounded, and as a matter of course subjected to all the hardships and vicissitudes of camp life. I may mention that I had cholera twice during that time. Since my return to England I have consulted medical men with little relief, and finding that I was losing flesh and becoming weaker every day, I have had recourse to "Eclectica", and in it, I am thankful to say, I have found the long-desired remedy for my numerous ailments. I felt relief from the first dose, my appetite has returned, I enjoy my food with the appetite of a campaigner, the pain and flatulence have left me, I take exercise in the open air, and am gaining strength daily. I remain, yours faithfully,

WILLIAM CONNOLLY, V.C.

He improved his financial standing by selling his VC at auction in 1886 for £10. This was bought by Charles Winter, the newly appointed head of the Medal Department at Spink. The first sale at auction of a VC was in 1884. Towards the end of his life he lived in Great Homer Street Everton and had a deposit at Great Homer Street Post Office Savings Bank. He died on 31 December 1891 of bronchitis at the Johnson family's residence at 14 Westminster Road Kirkdale, Liverpool. He was 75 years old. Mrs Johnson's daughter, Emma Catterall, was present at his death and informed the Kirkdale Registrar, Robert Henry Webster, the next day. He was buried on 4 January 1892 in Section CE 17 Grave 220 at Kirkdale Cemetery. The mode of burial was 'Public' so the grave was unmarked. Most people were buried in 'Public' graves in those days. He made provision for his own funeral in his will and left £37 12s to his friend and doctor, Thomas Hill, of 6 Westminster Road. The solicitor involved in the probate was William Henry Quilliam.

Most biographies of Connolly make no reference to his will and wrongly assume he died in poverty. Some authors suggest that William Connelly, labourer, aged 73 years, residing at Walton Workhouse in 1891 was William Connolly VC. This man was probably William Connell who died at Walton Workhouse aged 74 years and was buried at St Mary's Bootle on 24 February 1893. Similar biographical content detailing Connolly's supposed decline into poverty was given to the Liverpool Echo by local politicians when a plaque was unveiled on the grave at Kirkdale Cemetery in 2015. Prior to this event there was an appeal by Liverpool City Council for help in tracing any relatives of William Connolly. Researchers from Liverpool & South West Lancashire Family History Society and RootsChat genealogy forums found out that Connolly had left a will. Information about the existence of a will was forwarded to the relevant person but unfortunately it was not followed up on. Correspondence sent to the Liverpool Echo revealed some of the contents of the will, highlighted mistakes in Connolly's biography and was generally critical of previous accounts of Connolly's life.

== Details ==
Connolly was about 41 years old, and a gunner in the Bengal Horse Artillery during the Indian Mutiny when the following deed took place on 7 July 1857 at Jhelum, British India, for which he was awarded the VC:

Lieutenant Cookes, Bengal horse artillery, reports that “about daybreak on that day I advanced my half troop at a gallop, and engaged the enemy within easy musket range. The spongeman of one of my guns having been shot during the advance, gunner Connolly assumed the duties of second spongeman, and he had barely assisted in two discharges of his gun when a musket ball through the left thigh felled him to the ground; nothing daunted by pain and loss of blood, he was endeavouring to resume his post, when I ordered a movement in retirement, and, though severely wounded, he was mounted on his horse in the gun-team, and rode to the next position which the guns took up, and manfully declined going to the rear when the necessity of so doing was represented to him.

About eleven o’clock A.M., when the guns were still in action, the same gunner, while sponging, was again knocked down by a musket-ball striking him on the hip, thereby causing great faintness and partial unconsciousness, for the pain appeared excessive, and the blood flowed fast. On seeing this I gave directions for his removal out of action; but this brave man, hearing me, staggered to his feet and said, ‘No, sir, I’ll not go there whilst I can work here; and shortly afterwards he again resumed his post as spongeman.

Late in the afternoon of the same day, my three guns were engaged at 100 yards from the walls of a village with the defenders, namely, the 14th native infantry - mutineers - amidst a storm of bullets which did great execution. Gunner Connolly, though suffering severely from his two previous wounds, was wielding his sponge with an energy and courage which attracted the admiration of his comrades, and while cheerfully encouraging a wounded man to hasten in bringing up the ammunition a musket-ball tore through the muscles of his right leg; but with the most undaunted bravery he struggled on, and not till he had loaded six times did this man give way, when, from loss of blood, he fell in my arms, and I placed him on a waggon, which shortly afterwards bore him in a state of unconsciousness from the fight.”

== The medal ==
Today, his medal is on public display in the British in India Museum in Nelson, Lancashire, England.
