= Edmund Wodehouse (British Army officer) =

British Army general

General Edmund Wodehouse
- Born: c. 1819
- Died: 1898
- Military career
- Allegiance: United Kingdom
- Branch: British Army
- Service years: 1837–1881
- Rank: General

General Edmund Wodehouse (c. 1819 – 1898) was a senior officer in the British Army.

He was born the son of Edmund Wodehouse, the Member of Parliament for Norfolk.

He joined the British Army as an ensign in 1837 and was progressively promoted lieutenant (1841), captain (1845), major (1851), lieutenant-colonel of the 24th Foot (South Wales Borderers) (1860), colonel (1862), major-general (1868), lieutenant-general (1880) and full general on 1 July 1881. He was placed on the retired list in July 1881.

He was given the colonelcy of the South Wales Borderers in 1888, a position he held until his death in 1898.

Military offices
Preceded by Gen. Charles Henry Ellice	Colonel of the South Wales Borderers; 1888–1898	Succeeded by Lt-Gen. Richard Thomas Glyn
