= Edward Ellice (MP for St Andrews) =

British politician (1810–1880)

Edward Ellice the Younger
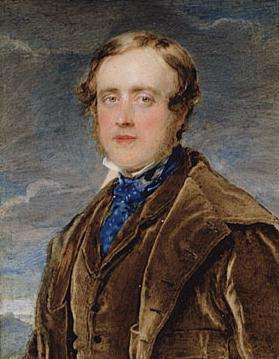
- Born: 19 August 1810; London
- Died: 2 August 1880 (aged 69)
- Known for: Politician; landowner
- Spouse(s): Katherine Jane Balfour; Eliza Stewart
- Parents: Edward Ellice (father); Hannah Althea Grey (mother)
- Relatives: Robert Ellice (uncle); Alexander Ellice (uncle); Russell Ellice (uncle)

Edward Ellice the Younger (19 August 1810 – 2 August 1880) was a British Liberal Party politician and landowner.

== Life ==
He was the eldest son of Edward Ellice, from his first marriage to Hannah Althea Grey, the youngest sister of Charles Grey, 2nd Earl Grey. The Ellice family was English by descent, and had settled in Aberdeenshire in the mid-17th century. Edward Ellice was born in London in 1810 and was educated at Eton College (1823–1836) and at Trinity College, Cambridge. He matriculated at the University of Cambridge on the 6 June 1828 and in 1831 was awarded a master of arts degree.

In 1832, he was appointed as Private Secretary to John Lambton, 1st Earl of Durham for his diplomatic mission to Russia. Lord Durham was a close friend and a relative of Ellice's father, having married the Earl Grey's second daughter. Ellice was an unsuccessful candidate for Inverness Burghs in the 1835 general election, but was elected to represent Huddersfield in a May 1837 by-election. In the general election that year he was elected to represent St Andrews Burghs, a seat he held until 1880.

Ellice continued as Durham's private secretary during his term as Governor-General of the Province of Canada; whilst he was working in Canada, his wife Katherine and her sister were captured for six days during the Rebellions of 1837–1838.

He remained a backbencher throughout his political career, taking special interest in the reform of the Scottish Poor Laws. He supported the idea of "clearance", but viewed indiscriminate forcible eviction of the peasantry as "cruel and indefensible".

He was offered a peerage by William Gladstone in 1869, but declined the offer, and retired from Parliament in early 1880, shortly before his death aged 69.

Ellice married the diarist Katherine Jane Balfour, daughter of General Balfour of Balbirnie, in 1834. She accompanied him to Russia and Canada. In 1859 she was hostess to the artist Richard Doyle who gifted her an illustrated diary of a journey to the islands of Rona and Skye. Following her death in 1864, Ellice married in 1867 Eliza Stewart, daughter of Thomas Campbell Hagart of Bantaskine, widow of Alexander Spiers of Elderslie.

Ellice owned the large Scottish Highlands sporting estate of Invergarry, where the architect David Bryce built Invergarry House (now the Glengarry Castle Hotel) for him between 1866 and 1869

Parliament of the United Kingdom
| Preceded by John Blackburne | Member of Parliament for Huddersfield; 1837 | Succeeded by William Rookes Crompton Stansfield |
| Preceded by Andrew Johnston | Member of Parliament for St Andrews Burghs; 1837–1880 | Succeeded by Stephen Williamson |
