= Edward Ellice (merchant) =

British merchant and politician (1783–1863)

The Right Honourable Edward Ellice
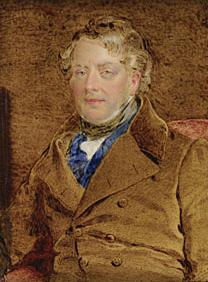
- Painting by Sir Charles William Ross

Secretary at War
- In office 1833–1834
- Preceded by: Sir John Hobhouse
- Succeeded by: John Charles Herries

Financial Secretary to the Treasury
- In office 1830–1832
- Preceded by: Office created
- Succeeded by: Charles Wood

Personal details
- Born: 27 September 1783 London, England
- Died: 17 September 1863 (aged 79) Glengarry, Scotland
- Spouse(s): Lady Hannah Bettesworth (m. 1809) (née Lady Hannah Grey) Anne Coke (m. 1843; died 1844), Dowager Countess of Leicester (née Lady Anne Keppel)
- Children: Edward Ellice, Jr.
- Parents: Alexander Ellice (father); Ann Russell (mother)
- Relatives: Robert Ellice (brother); Alexander Ellice (brother); Russell Ellice (brother); Charles Grey (father-in-law); John George Lambton (brother-in-law); Katherine Ellice (daughter-in-law)
- Education: Winchester School
- Alma mater: Marischal College, University of Aberdeen; University of St Andrews

Edward Ellice the Elder (27 September 1783 – 17 September 1863), known in his time as the "Bear", was an English merchant and politician. He was a Director of the Hudson's Bay Company and a prime mover behind the Reform Bill of 1832.

== Biography ==
Ellice was born on 27 September 1783 in London, the son of Alexander Ellice and Ann Russell. In 1795, his father purchased the Seigneury of Villechauve in Canada from Michel Chartier de Lotbinière, Marquis de Lotbinière. His younger brother was General Robert Ellice.

He was educated at Winchester School and at Marischal College, Aberdeen. He became a partner in the firm of Phyn, Ellices and Inglis, which had become interested in the XY Company in Canada. He was sent to Canada in 1803, and in 1804 became a party to the union of the XY and North West Companies. He became a partner in the North West Company, and during the struggle with Lord Selkirk he played an important part.

He engaged in the Canada fur trade from 1803, and as a result was nicknamed "the Bear". On 30 October 1809 he married Hannah Althea Bettesworth, née Grey, daughter of Charles Grey, 1st Earl Grey, and the widow of Captain George Edmund Byron Bettesworth. He had one son by her, Edward.

In 1820, he was, with the brothers William and Simon McGillivray, active in bringing about the union of the North West and the Hudson's Bay Companies; and it was actually with him and the McGillivrays that the union was negotiated. He amalgamated the North West, XY, and Hudson's Bay companies in 1821.

In 1825 Ellice was a director of the New Zealand Company, a venture chaired by his brother-in-law, the wealthy John George Lambton, Whig MP (and later 1st Earl of Durham), that made the first attempt to colonise New Zealand. His brother Russell Ellice was also a director.

He was Member of Parliament for Coventry from 1818 to 1826, and again from 1830 to 1863. He served as a Secretary to the Treasury, and a whip in Lord Grey's government, 1830–1832. He was Secretary at War from 1832 to 1834, during which time he proposed that appointments in the army should be made directly from his office. He founded the Reform Club in 1836 and supported Palmerston as premier. He was appointed a Privy Counsellor in 1833.

He was awarded a DCL by St Andrews University. He privately urged French government to send troops into Spain in 1836. He was deputy-governor of the Hudson's Bay Company.

Ellice was a co-owner of eight sugar estates in Grenada, British Guiana, Tobago and Antigua. In the 1830s, the British government emancipated the slaves, and Ellice received £35,000 in compensation for the liberation of over 300 slaves.

In 1843, he married, secondly, Anne Amelia Leicester, née Keppel, daughter of William Keppel, 4th Earl of Albemarle and widow of Thomas Coke, 1st Earl of Leicester. She died in the following year. His only son was Edward Ellice Jr., who also sat in Parliament.

His brother General Robert Ellice married Eliza Courtney; one of their grandsons became his son's heir in 1880.

=== Sporting interests ===
On returning from Canada in 1838, Ellice bought the estate of Glenquoich in Lochaber, and built a lodge on the shores of Loch Quoich designed by Inverness architect Alexander Ross. In the summer and autumn months he entertained a wide range of guests there, including artists, writers, statesmen and diplomats. The lodge, along with the nearby village, post office and school was lost when submerged during the raising of the loch level by 30m following construction of a hydroelectric dam.

In the 1840s Ellice was also a shooting tenant on Sir George Macpherson Grant's Invereshie estate in Badenoch. Over a seven year period his sporting yields there were 14,560 grouse, 810 ptarmigan and 146 blackcock, plus woodcock, partridge, teal, snipe and mountain hares. He shot 34 deer at Invereshie between 1834 and 1839. His sporting activities provoked complaints from the estate's farming tenants and Macpherson Grant regarded him as a problem tenant.

== Legacy ==
The Ellice Islands, formerly part of the colony of Gilbert and Ellice Islands and now the independent nation of Tuvalu, were named after him. The Rural Municipality of Ellice in Manitoba, Fort Ellice, and Ellice Avenue in Winnipeg are named after him.

== See also ==
- Edward Ellice (1813 ship)
- Lady Hannah Ellice (1812 ship)

== Bibliography ==
- W. Stewart Wallace, ed. (1948). The Encyclopedia of Canada, vol. II. Toronto: University Associates of Canada. pp. 287–288.
- Colthart, James M. (1976). "Edward Ellice". Dictionary of Canadian Biography, vol. IX. Toronto. ISBN 0-8020-3319-9.
- Watkin, Edward William. Canada and the States. Forgotten Books. ISBN 1-60620-892-6.
- "Archival material relating to Edward Ellice". UK National Archives.
- "Our History: Acquisitions". Hudson's Bay Company. Archived from the original on 11 December 2008.

Parliament of the United Kingdom
Preceded by Joseph Butterworth; Peter Moore	Member of Parliament for Coventry; 1818–1826; With: Peter Moore	Succeeded by Thomas Bilcliffe Fyler; Richard Edensor Heathcote
Preceded by Thomas Bilcliffe Fyler; Richard Edensor Heathcote	Member of Parliament for Coventry; 1830–1863; With: Thomas Bilcliffe Fyler 1830–1831; Henry Lytton Earle Bulwer 1831–1835; William Williams 1835–1847; George James Turner 1847–1851; Charles Geach 1851–1854; Sir Joseph Paxton 1854–1863	Succeeded by Morgan Treherne; Sir Joseph Paxton
Political offices
Preceded by Joseph Planta; George Robert Dawson as Secretary to the Treasury	Financial Secretary to the Treasury; 1830–1832	Succeeded by Charles Wood
Preceded by Sir John Hobhouse, Bt	Secretary at War; 1833–1834	Succeeded by John Charles Herries
