= Thomas Fyler =

British politician (1788–1838)

- Born: 12 September 1788
- Died: 4 March 1838 (aged 49)
- Occupation: Politician
- Position held: member of the 8th Parliament of the United Kingdom (1826–1830), member of the 9th Parliament of the United Kingdom (1830–1831)

Thomas Bilcliffe Fyler MP (12 September 1788 – 4 March 1838) was a British Tory politician who represented Coventry in the House of Commons from 10 June 1826 to 25 July 1831.

== Early life ==
Fyler was an army officer and barrister. He attended Winchester School 1799-1806, before going up to Christ Church, Oxford then to Lincoln's Inn

== Parliamentary career ==
Fyler was first elected at the 1826 general election as a 'no Popery' Tory, opposing Catholic emancipation and supported by the corporation of the City of Coventry

Fyler was re-elected unopposed at the 1830 general election

He gave his maiden speech opposing the use of impressment by the Royal Navy. He was opposed to radical parliamentary reform and spoke against the introduction of annual parliaments, election by ballot and universal suffrage but favoured moderate reform such as the enfranchisement of cities. Fyler was an opponent of the Corn Laws and spoke in the House of Commons on the subject of the distress caused by the Laws to working people.

Fyler left the House of Commons at the 1831 general election where he lost his seat to Henry Bulwer, a Whig, who was a more enthusiastic supporter of parliamentary reform. Fyler unsuccessfully contested the Coventry seat again at the general election of 1832
