= Alexander Ellice (fur trader) =

British merchant, shipowner, landowner and seigneur

- Born: 1743; Auchterless, Scotland
- Died: 1805 (aged 61–62)
- Spouse: Ann Russell
- Children: 10

Alexander Ellice (1743–1805) was a Scottish merchant, landowner and lawyer who made his fortune in the North American fur trade.

== Early life ==
He was born in Auchterless, Scotland, the eldest of five sons of a successful miller, also named Alexander Ellice, and was baptised on 28 May 1743.

He attended Marischal College and was admitted to the Scottish bar.

== Business career ==
In 1765, he and his four brothers moved to Schenectady, New York. The next year, he entered into a partnership to engage in fur trading and general merchandising in upstate New York and the lower Great Lakes region. The firm of Phyn, Ellice and Company prospered, and his brother Robert became a partner in 1768.

Phyn, Ellice and Company imported goods, first from Scotland, then from London. However, tensions mounted between the American colonies and Britain. An embargo in 1770 forced the company to bring in its imports through Quebec. Finally, in October 1774, the colonies broke off commercial ties with Britain. The committee of correspondence in Schenectady subsequently reprimanded Ellice for trying to sneak goods in by way of Montreal. A decision was made. Partner James Phyn left to establish an office in London. Ellice himself left for England in October 1775. Some of the business assets were transferred to Ellice's brother James, and the remainder was liquidated.

Ellice returned to North America and established Alexander Ellice and Company in Montreal in 1776. He became a major financier, supplier and middleman of the fur trade, amassing most of his fortune this way. He traveled frequently back and forth between Montreal and London. He retired in 1802 due to poor health, though in 1804 he and his son Edward attempted to buy controlling interest in the Hudson's Bay Company for £103,000.

Ellice invested some of his profits in mortgages and land. For example, in January 1770 he was granted a royal grant near Cooperstown encompassing 20,000 acres (8,100 ha). In 1795, he purchased the 324-square-mile (840 km^{2}) seigneury of Villechauve (also known as Beauharnois) from Michel Chartier de Lotbinière, Marquis de Lotbinière, for £9000 and had a large manor house built there. He also bought most of the neighbouring townships of Godmanchester and Hinchinbrook. From his involvement in the triangular trade, he acquired plantations in the Caribbean for non-payment of debts.

At his death in 1805, his estate was valued at either £430,000 or over £450,000, and included extensive properties in North America and the West Indies, including nearly 350,000 acres (140,000 ha) in New York and Canada alone.

== Personal life ==
He married Ann Russell around 1780. They had ten surviving children at the time of his death, including:

- Edward Ellice (1783–1863), British merchant and politician, a director of the Hudson's Bay Company and a prime mover behind the Reform Act 1832
- Robert Ellice (1784–1856), British Army general
- Alexander Ellice (1791–1853), British Royal Navy officer and Member of Parliament
- Russell Ellice (1799–1873), British businessman, Chairman of the East India Company and one of the first directors of the British American Land Company

== Business records ==
Alexander Ellice's business records are part of the Little Falls Business and Legal Records collection at The Buffalo History Museum.
