= Alexander Ellice (Royal Navy officer) =

Royal Navy officer & politician (1791-1853)

Captain Alexander Ellice
- Born: 3 October 1791
- Died: 8 October 1853 (aged 62)
- Parents: Alexander Ellice (father); Ann Russell (mother)
- Relatives: Edward Ellice (brother); Robert Ellice (brother); Russell Ellice (brother)

Alexander Ellice (3 October 1791 – 8 October 1853) was a British naval officer, and for four years Member of Parliament for the constituency of Harwich, Essex. He was thereafter Comptroller of the Steam Department at the Admiralty for a year.

== Biography ==
Alexander Ellice was born 3 October 1791 in London, the son of the merchant and fur trader Alexander Ellice, and Ann Ellice (née Russell). In 1795, his father purchased the Seigneury of Villechauve from Michel Chartier de Lotbinière, Marquis de Lotbinière. His brothers included General Robert Ellice and the politician and Hudson's Bay merchant Edward Ellice.

Alexander Ellice entered the Navy on 2 August 1806 as a volunteer on board HMS Crocodile, under Captain George Edmund Byron Bettesworth; and afterwards joined HMS Tartar as midshipman, was present on 15 May 1808 in a severe action of an hour and a half with a Danish flotilla, near Bergen, in which Captain Bettesworth was killed. He continued to serve in HMS Tartar under Captain Joseph Baker until being transferred in June 1809 to HMS Victory, flagship of Sir James Saumarez in the Baltic.

Ellice was employed in the Mediterranean from January 1811 to June 1813 under Captain Henry Duncan in HMS Imperieuse. During that period, among other services, he took part on 17 August 1812 in – according to the Naval Biographical Dictionary – a spirited skirmish with a powerful Neapolitan squadron in the Gulf of Naples.

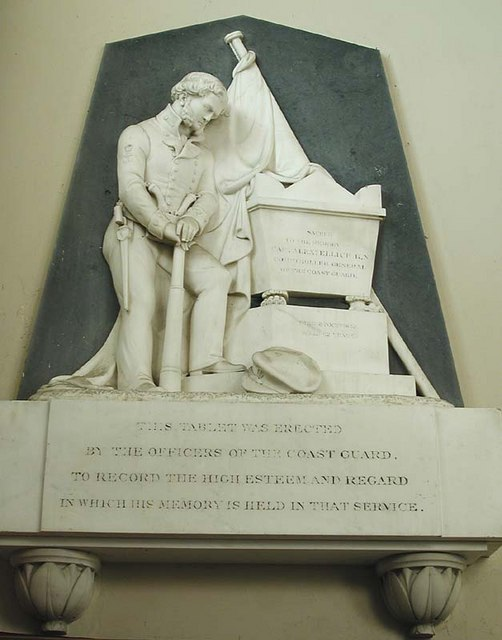
Monument in Hampton Church

He was promoted to the rank of lieutenant on 30 October 1813 and transferred to HMS Indus under Captain William Hall Gage. Ellice subsequently joined – on 18 January 1814, HMS Caledonia, bearing the flag of Lord Exmouth, under whom he appears to have been soon afterwards present in a partial action with the Toulon fleet – on 2 June 1814, HMS Cossack and on 29 April 1815, HMS Tenedos, commanded on the North American station by Captains Lord Prudhoe, Robert Rodney, and Hyde Parker – on 6 March 1816, he joined HMS Minden under Captain William Paterson, in which ship, after participating in the 1816 Bombardment of Algiers, he served for four years in the East Indies under the flag of Sir Richard King – and, on 27 May 1822, as first-lieutenant, HMS Jupiter, under Captain George Augustus Westphal, employed on Particular Service.

He attained the rank of commander on 19 February 1823; and was married on 28 September 1826 to Lucy Frances, daughter of Charles Lock, the British consul-general in Naples during the Neapolitan Revolution of 1799. Captain Ellice was stationed, for some months in 1831, off Oporto in HMS Victor. Attaining post-rank on 20 December of that year, he was next appointed to HMS Ocean on 16 August 1834, and to HMS Howe on 27 August 1835, both flagships at Sheerness of Charles Elphinstone Fleeming.

In the 1837 United Kingdom general election, Ellice was on the 24 July 1837 elected MP for Harwich, in the Whig interest, serving until the dissolution of the 13th UK Parliament on 23 June 1841. He did not stand in subsequent elections.

Returning to the navy, he was appointed on 6 August 1841 to HMS Astraea on the Falmouth station; and on 10 September 1843 to the Packet service at Southampton, with his name on the books of Victory. He went on half-pay from 1846 and was appointed on 2 December 1846 to succeed Sir William Edward Parry in the Comptrollership of Steam Machinery; Ellice was replaced after a year by Thomas Lloyd.

Alexander Ellice died on 8 October 1853. There is a monument for him in St Mary's Parish Church, Hampton.

The Centre for the Study of the Legacies of British Slave-ownership notes that Alexander Ellice renounced a claim arising from slaves held on the Morant estate in St Thomas-in-the-East, Jamaica, in favour of one A. R. Blake, but holds no further enlightening details.

Parliament of the United Kingdom
| Preceded by Charles Bathurst; Nicholas Vansittart | Member of Parliament for Harwich; 1837–1841; With: John Charles Herries | Succeeded by William Beresford; John Attwood |
