= Battle of Jhelum (1857) =

Part of the Indian Rebellion of 1857

- Part of the Indian rebellion of 1857
Date	7 July 1857
Location	Jhelum, British India (now Pakistan) 32°56′33″N 73°43′32″E
Result	British victory

Belligerents
(United Kingdom) United Kingdom; 24th Regiment of Foot (285 men); Miller's Police Battalion (150 men); Police Cavalry (60 sabres); Moolantee Mounted Levie (250 sabres); Captain Cookes' Company, Bengal Horse Artillery (3 guns); 14th Bengal Native Infantry (100 Sikh sepoys)	14th Bengal Native Infantry (500 mutineer sepoys)

Commanders and leaders
Lieutenant Colonel Charles Ellice, 24th of Foot	Mirza Dildar Baig, 14 BNI mutineers

Strength
435 infantry 310 cavalry 100 Sikh sepoys 3 horse artillery guns	Approximately 500 sepoys

Casualties and losses
44 killed 109 wounded	150 killed 25 drowned 108 executed
- Location within Punjab Pakistan Jhelum (Pakistan)

During the Indian Rebellion of 1857 (also known as the Indian Mutiny) a column of troops led by the commander of the 24th Regiment of Foot was sent to disarm Bengal Native Infantry units believed to be at risk of mutiny in Rawalpindi and Jhelum. At Rawalpindi, the 58th Bengal Native Infantry was disarmed peacefully, however the two companies of the 14th Bengal Native Infantry resisted the attempt by force of arms. These two companies were quickly defeated by the British, loyal native troops and the local population. In Jhelum, also garrisoned by the 14th, the concurrently timed disarmament was much more violent. Thirty five British soldiers of the 24th Regiment of Foot (of later Rorkes Drift fame) were killed (or died of their wounds) along with a number of Loyal Indian troops, by mutinous sepoys of the 14th Bengal Native Infantry. When the mutineers realised that they, except the Sikhs, were to be disarmed, they mutinied and made a vigorous defence against the force that had arrived from Rawalpindi to disarm them. The following night a significant number of mutineers managed to slip away but most were subsequently arrested by the Kashmir authorities, into whose territory they had escaped.

== Background ==
The background to the Indian Mutiny, or the Indian Rebellion of 1857 as it is also referred to, is complex and has its origins largely with the Hindu members of the British East India Company Army of the Presidency of Bengal (although the British view after the mutiny was that it was largely driven by Muslim members). Each of the three "Presidencies" into which the East India Company divided India for administrative purposes maintained their own armies. Of these, the Army of the Bengal Presidency was the largest. Unlike the other two, it recruited heavily from among high-caste Hindus and comparatively wealthy Muslims. The Muslims formed a larger percentage of the 18 irregular cavalry units within the Bengal Army, while Hindus were mainly to be found in the 84 regular infantry and cavalry regiments. The sepoys were therefore affected to a large degree by the concerns of the landholding and traditional members of Indian society. In the early years of Company rule, it tolerated and even encouraged the caste privileges and customs within the Bengal Army, which recruited its regular soldiers almost exclusively amongst the landowning Brahmins and Rajputs of Bihar and Awadh. These soldiers were known as Purbiyas. By the time these customs and privileges came to be threatened by modernising regimes in Calcutta from the 1840s onwards, the sepoys had become accustomed to very high ritual status and were extremely sensitive to suggestions that their caste might be polluted.

The sepoys also gradually became dissatisfied with various other aspects of army life. Their pay was relatively low and after Awadh and the Punjab were annexed, the soldiers no longer received extra pay (batta or bhatta) for service there, because they were no longer considered "foreign missions". The junior European officers became increasingly estranged from their soldiers, in many cases treating them as their racial inferiors. In 1856, a new Enlistment Act was introduced by the Company, which in theory made every unit in the Bengal Army liable to service overseas. Although it was intended to apply to only new recruits, the serving sepoys feared that the Act might be applied retroactively to them as well. A high-caste Hindu who travelled in the cramped conditions of a wooden troop ship could not cook his own food on his own fire, and accordingly risked losing caste through ritual pollution.

The incident which appears to have been the actual flash point for the mutiny of units within the East India Company Army related to the issue of new cartridges for the in service rifle. These cartridges were covered in grease which it was rumoured was made from animal fat, and specifically beef or pig fat. As soldiers had to place the cartridges in their mouth to rip them open and cows were regarded as sacred by Hindus and pigs unclean by Muslims this rumour created outrage. This spilled over into open defiance in some units and eventually a very bloody mutiny in Meerut and Delhi.

== Disarming of Native Units ==
As some units openly rebelled and disquiet spread the decision was made to disarm some Bengal units that it was believed may be at risk of mutiny. This does not appear to have been a blanket policy across the East India Company Army and the decision as to whether or not to disarm units or not appears to have been taken on a case by case basis at a local level. In some cases attempts to disarm units went badly wrong or were bungled such as at Benares and Allahabad, also leading to local revolts. As a result, orders to disarm other Bengal Native units were carried with much more secrecy.

== Deployment of forces ==
To prevent forewarning the Bengal Native Infantry units in either Jhelum or Rawalpindi of plans to disarm them the decision was taken to arrange for both garrisons to be disarmed simultaneously. On 1 July 1857 a small force was dispatched under the command of Lieutenant Colonel Charles Ellice, consisting of three companies of the 24th Regiment of Foot (a Regular British Army unit rather than an East India Company unit), a total of 260 men, three guns from Captain Cooke's Company of the Bengal Horse Artillery and 150 men of Miller's Police Battalion (an Indian unit). This force was ordered to proceed under sealed orders to Rawalpindi and were joined en route by Mooltanee levies under Lieutenant Lind. None of the officers or men knew the mission they were being sent on and many had assumed that they would be sent to Delhi.

On the morning of 7 July the garrison at Rawalpindi was called out on parade, ostensibly to hear the reading of routine orders. Troops in the garrison at the time consisted of the other half of the 24th of Foot and the remainder of Cooke's Company of the Bengal Horse Artillery, with elements of Captain Millar's Mounted Police, the 58th Bengal Native Infantry and two companies of the 14th Bengal Native Infantry. During the issue of routine orders Brigadier Campbell of the Royal Artillery and commander of the garrison issued orders for the two Bengal Native Infantry units to be disarmed. This was done without the knowledge of these two units' British Officers and while the 58th obeyed the orders the two companies of the 14th took to arms and carried out a fighting withdrawal pursued by the Mounted Police. Those of the two companies that escaped into the town were later captured by the locals and their heads were delivered to the garrison the following day by the townspeople.

== The Battle ==
On the morning of 6 July, Charles Ellice's force arrived at Deenah, one day's march from Jhelum, where he was to open his sealed orders. With the intent of the expedition now clear, Ellice sent half of his mounted Mooltanee troops ahead of the column, ordering them to cross the river and proceed through the low ground and waddies so as to avoid detection and cover that flank. He then rode ahead himself to Jhelum and met with Lieutenant Colonel Gerard, commander of the 14th Bengal Native Infantry, to direct him as to how he was to co-operate with his force the following morning.

Early on the following day (7 July), as events were unfolding in Rawalpindi, the three guns from Captain Cooke's Company of the Bengal Horse Artillery and the remainder of the Mooltanee Cavalry took up positions to the right of the Jhelum Cantonment and cut off the lines of communication. Later that morning the infantry of the 24th of Foot arrived moving into the open outside the cantonment and began deploying into line. The 14th Bengal Native Infantry were at this stage formed up in column on their parade square, with the Sikh members of the unit formed up to one side. Upon seeing the British troops come into sight the men of the 14th realised that they were about to be disarmed and began loading their weapons and making ready for a fight. Their European officers attempted to remonstrate with them and get them to lay down their weapons but without any success. As the Sikh troops and European Officers realised the danger they were in they began moving rapidly towards the 24th Regiment of Foot, just in time as the remaining troops of the 14th began opening fire on them.

The mutineers began deploying into defensive positions and blocking the main route into the garrison but were met by a charge by the Mooltanee Cavalry led by Lieutenant Lind. The cavalry charge caused a significant number of casualties amongst the mutineers but with Lieutenant Lind going down (with his mount shot out from under him) and the 14th in a strong defensive position the cavalry couldn't press home their attack. In ten minutes the Mooltanees had suffered 9 dead, 28 wounded and 60 horses killed. The Mooltanee Infantry and the men of Millar's Police Battalion followed up the attack supported by the guns of the Bengal Horse Artillery but a stalemate ensued.

Finally, Ellice took 50 of his men from the 24th of Foot and led them in a charge, hoping to storm the enemy position, and managed to break through the Quarter Guard of the mutineers. Ellice fell during the charge (wounded in the neck and leg), but the mutineers of the 14th Bengal Native Infantry fell back into the adjoining camp of the 39th Bengal Native Infantry. The mutineers were then forced to retreat from their new position when an artillery shell hit the magazine causing a large explosion, around 300 escaping to the nearby village of Saemlee and prepared new positions.

During this lull in the battle the men of the 24th of Foot discovered the 39th's Mess and stores including the alcohol. After a long march the men were difficult to restrain and order was lost for a brief period with only the men of the Bengal Horse artillery and the Mooltanees remaining disciplined and watching the enemy.

When Ellice recovered enough to take command order was restored and he ordered another attack. The Mounted Police and Mooltanees Cavalry were placed on the left flank of the village to prevent the mutineers from slipping away and the artillery was ordered closer to the village to begin a bombardment with Grapeshot. The range was however so close, and the mutineers sufficiently covered by the village's buildings, that the artillerymen began to suffer severe casualties; being picked off by the enemy Sepoys. Captain McPherson of the 24th attempted to lead a charge to take the village by bayonet but was forced to withdraw.

With ammunition running low and the artillery suffering badly in casualties to men and horses, Ellice ordered a withdrawal. Due to the losses in horses and damage one of the guns could not be pulled away and was captured and tipped into the river by the mutineers. As it was getting late the decision was made to wait until morning to renew the attack on the village and pickets were set. Concurrently the events of the day had been telegraphed to the garrison at Rawalpindi as events had unfolded and a Colonel was despatched to replace the wounded Ellice and a small column of reinforcements of the 24th was dispatched under the command of Lieutenant Holland.

In the morning when the attack was to be resumed the attackers found that the remainder of the 14 Bengal Native Infantry's mutineers has slipped away in the night.

== Aftermath ==
Although a large number of mutineers escaped they found they could not cross the river easily, the Punjabi Police having secured the major crossing points and boats. Those that did manage to find some small boats were mostly captured by the Mooltanees patrolling the far side of the river or by other troops further downstream. In all of the 600 men of the 14th Bengali Native Light Infantry based at Jhelum, 100 Sikhs had remained loyal, 150 were killed outright in the fighting, 180 were captured by British or East India Company forces and 150 were arrested by the Kashmiri authorities and handed over to the British. Only 50 remained unaccounted for. The result of the fighting at Jhelum and Rawalpindi was the destruction of the 14th Bengali Native Infantry as a unit.

Lieutenant Colonel Ellice was Mentioned in dispatches, received the Indian Mutiny Medal, and was appointed a Companion of the Order of the Bath on 1 January 1858.

The early success of the 14th Bengali Native Infantry was however to have a wider effect sending shock waves through the region and sparking unrest in nearby garrisons.

== Victoria Cross ==
Gunner William Connolly, a Bengal Horse Artillery soldier with the force sent from Rawalpindi to disarm the mutineers, won a Victoria Cross during fighting at Jhelum on 7 July 1857.

Lieutenant Cookes, Bengal horse artillery, reports that “about daybreak on that day I advanced my half troop at a gallop, and engaged the enemy within easy musket range. The spongeman of one of my guns having been shot during the advance, gunner Connolly assumed the duties of second spongeman, and he had barely assisted in two discharges of his gun when a musket ball through the left thigh felled him to the ground; nothing daunted by pain and loss of blood, he was endeavouring to resume his post, when I ordered a movement in retirement, and, though severely wounded, he was mounted on his horse in the gun-team, and rode to the next position which the guns took up, and manfully declined going to the rear when the necessity of so doing was represented to him.

About eleven o’clock A.M., when the guns were still in action, the same gunner, while sponging, was again knocked down by a musket-ball striking him on the hip, thereby causing great faintness and partial unconsciousness, for the pain appeared excessive, and the blood flowed fast. On seeing this I gave directions for his removal out of action; but this brave man, hearing me, staggered to his feet and said, ‘No, sir, I'll not go there whilst I can work here; and shortly afterwards he again resumed his post as spongeman.

Late in the afternoon of the same day, my three guns were engaged at 100 yards from the walls of a village with the defenders, namely, the 14th native infantry - mutineers - amidst a storm of bullets which did great execution. Gunner Connolly, though suffering severely from his two previous wounds, was wielding his sponge with an energy and courage which attracted the admiration of his comrades, and while cheerfully encouraging a wounded man to hasten in bringing up the ammunition a musket-ball tore through the muscles of his right leg; but with the most undaunted bravery he struggled on, and not till he had loaded six times did this man give way, when, from loss of blood, he fell in my arms, and I placed him on a waggon, which shortly afterwards bore him in a state of unconsciousness from the fight.”

== Memorials ==
Mirza Dildar Baig, also known as Khaki Shah, took part in the mutiny at Jhelum and was later celebrated by Indian Nationalists. He was captured and arrested with the remaining mutineers by British authorities in Kashmir and later hanged near the river Jhelum. His grave is in a shrine in Jhelum Dildarpur, and a small town in Uttar Pradesh is also named after him.

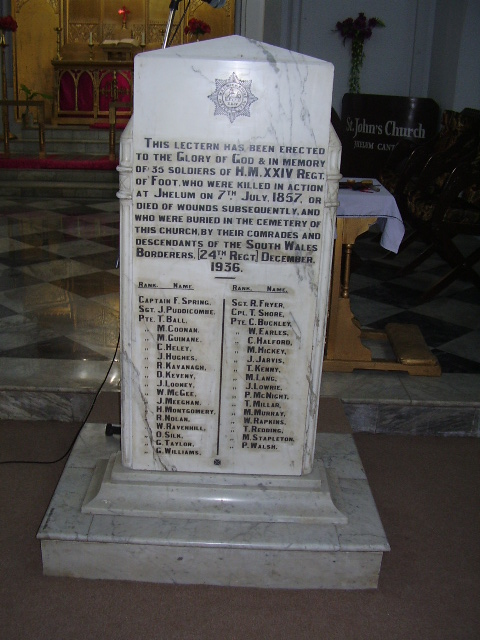
Marble Lectern in memory of 35 British soldiers killed at Jhelum.

A lectern inside St. John's Church Jhelum the church commemorates the 35 soldiers of the 24th regiment of Foot killed during the mutiny. Among the dead was Captain Francis Spring, the eldest son of Colonel William Spring. St. John's Church is located in Jhelum Cantonment, now part of Pakistan, beside the river Jhelum. It was built in 1860 and is a landmark of the city. It is a Protestant church and was in use during the British period. For forty years it remained closed. Now it has been renovated and opened and almost in good condition.

== Sources ==
- Cave-Brown, John. The Punjab and Delhi in 1857: Being a Narrative of the Measures by which the Punjab was Saved and Delhi Recovered During the Indian Mutiny, Volume 2. ISBN 9781287739074.
