= Robert Ellice =

British army general (1784-1856)

General Robert Ellice
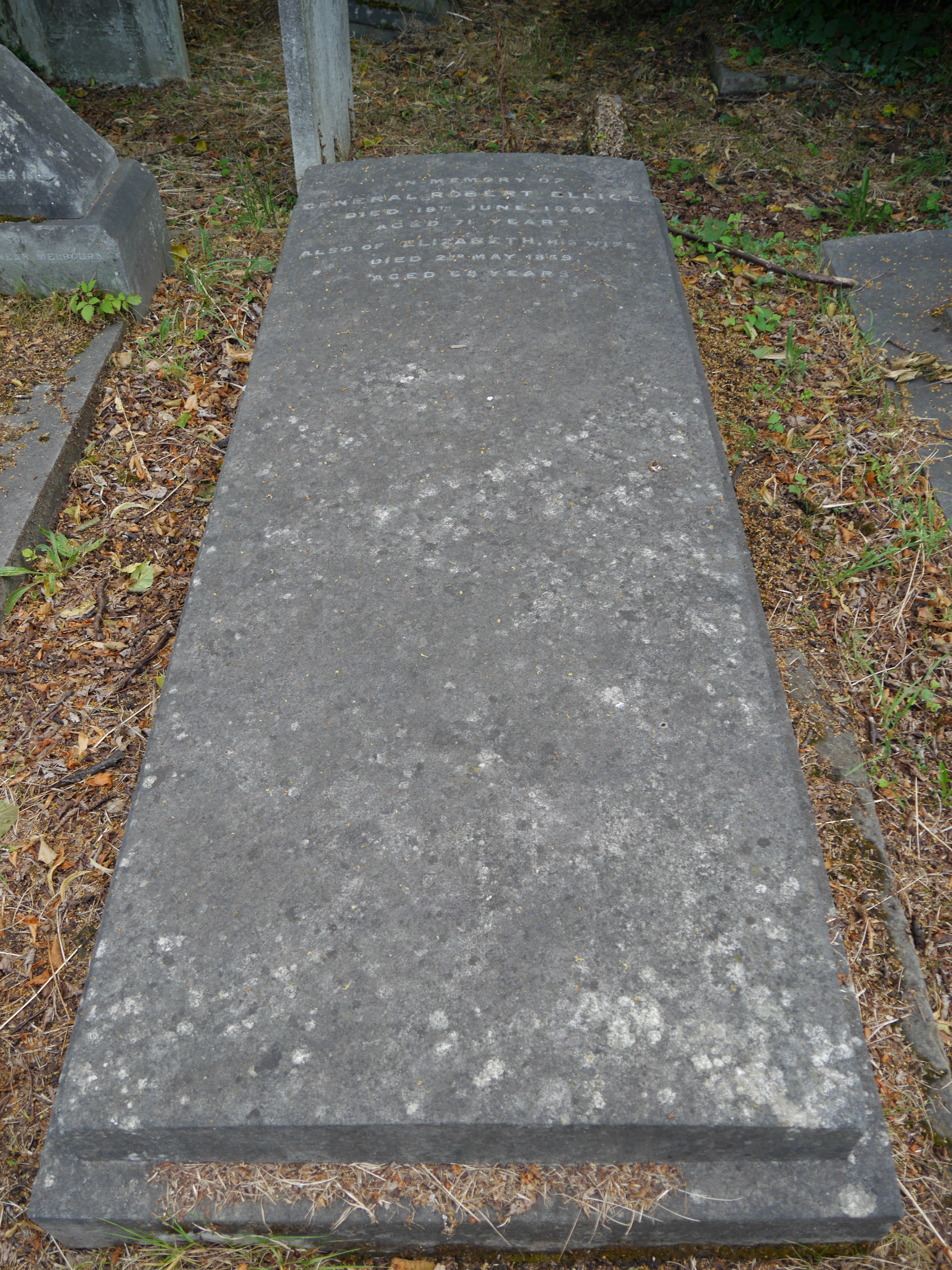
- Grave, Kensal Green Cemetery
- Born: 13 October 1784
- Died: 18 June 1856 (aged 71)
- Burial place: Kensal Green Cemetery
- Military career
- Allegiance: United Kingdom
- Branch: British Army
- Rank: General
- Unit: 24th (2nd Warwickshire) Regiment of Foot
- Commands: Western District; British troops in Malta
- Conflicts: Napoleonic Wars; British invasions of the River Plate
- Spouse: Eliza Courtney (m. 1814)
- Children: 4
- Father: Alexander Ellice
- Relatives: Alexander Ellice (brother); Russell Ellice (brother); General Sir Charles Ellice (son); Henry Brand (son-in-law)

General Robert Ellice (13 October 1784 – 18 June 1856) was a British Army officer.

== Military career ==
Born the son of Scottish merchant and fur trader Alexander Ellice and brother of Edward Ellice and Alexander Ellice, Ellice was commissioned as an ensign on 8 November 1798. He saw action at Buenos Aires in 1807 before becoming Deputy Adjutant-General in Canada in 1809. He went on to be General Officer Commanding Western District in 1840 and General Officer Commanding the British troops in Malta in 1847.

He was also colonel of the 24th (2nd Warwickshire) Regiment of Foot.

He was buried in Kensal Green Cemetery.

== Family ==
On 10 December 1814, Ellice married Eliza Courtney, the illegitimate daughter of Charles Grey, 2nd Earl Grey and Georgiana Cavendish, Duchess of Devonshire; they had at least four children:

- Robert Ellice (1 January 1816 – 19 December 1858), married Eglantine Balfour, sister of Jane Ellice. These two sisters were captured and held captive for a week during the Battle of Beauharnois. The couple had one son:
  - Major Edward Charles Ellice (1858–21 February 1943) he married Margaret Thomas on 11 April 1889. They had ten children:
    - Edward Ellice (6 December 1891 – about 1893)
    - Isobel Ellice (18 November 1892)
    - Alexander Ellice (19 November 1894 – 16 October 1916) died in World War I at the age of twenty-one
    - Margaret Ellice (19 March 1896)
    - Andrew Robert Ellice (13 October 1897 – 28 September 1916) died in World War I at the age of eighteen
    - William Ellice (19 December 1898 – 26 November 1914) died in World War I, at the age of fifteen, when an internal explosion sank HMS Bulwark
    - Eglantine Ellice (9 January 1900 – 1989)
    - Russell Ellice (14 November 1902 – 1989)
    - Charles Ellice (7 March 1905)
- Georgiana Ellice (12 October 1817 – 12 October 1907), married Hugh Horatio Seymour (grandson of Francis Seymour-Conway, 1st Marquess of Hertford) on 4 November 1846. They had two children:
  - Charlotte Susan Seymour (5 August 1848) she married Charles Campion on 27 May 1879
  - Hugh Francis Seymour (23 December 1855 – 14 June 1930) he married Rachel Lascelles (granddaughter of Henry Lascelles, 3rd Earl of Harewood through his sixth son James) on 15 April 1884. They have five children:
    - Sir Horace James Seymour (26 February 1885 – 8 September 1978)
    - Lieutenant Francis Seymour (30 May 1886 – 30 July 1915)
    - Mabel Seymour (d. 21 July 1973)
    - Kathleen Georgiana Seymour (d. 29 May 1946)
    - Mary Gwendolen Seymour (d 18 September 1974)
- Elizabeth Georgiana Ellice (1818-8 March 1899), married Henry Brand, 1st Viscount Hampden on 16 April 1838, and they had ten children.
- General Sir Charles Ellice (10 May 1823 – 12 November 1888), married Louisa Lambton in 1862.

Military offices
Preceded by Sir Willoughby Cotton	GOC Western District; 1840–1842	Succeeded by Sir Henry Murray
Preceded by James Frederick Lyon	Colonel of the 24th (The 2nd Warwickshire) Regiment of Foot; 1842–1856	Succeeded by John Finch
