= Gurha Salim Airport =

- IATA: XJM; ICAO: OP922

Summary
- Airport type: Military
- Operator: Pakistan Army
- Location: Jhelum
- Elevation AMSL: 902 ft (275 m)
- Coordinates: 32°52′36″N 73°36′29″E
- Interactive map of Gurha Salim Airport

Runways
Direction	Length		Surface
Direction	ft	m	Surface
14/32	3,000	900	Asphalt

Gurha Salim Airbase (IATA: XJM, ICAO: OP 922) is situated 13 km (8 mi) from the city centre of Jhelum, in Punjab, Pakistan. The airbase is used only for military purposes.

== See also ==
- Jhelum Cantonment
- List of airports in Pakistan
- Transport in Pakistan
- Pakistan Civil Aviation Authority
