= St. John's Church, Jhelum =

St. John's Church
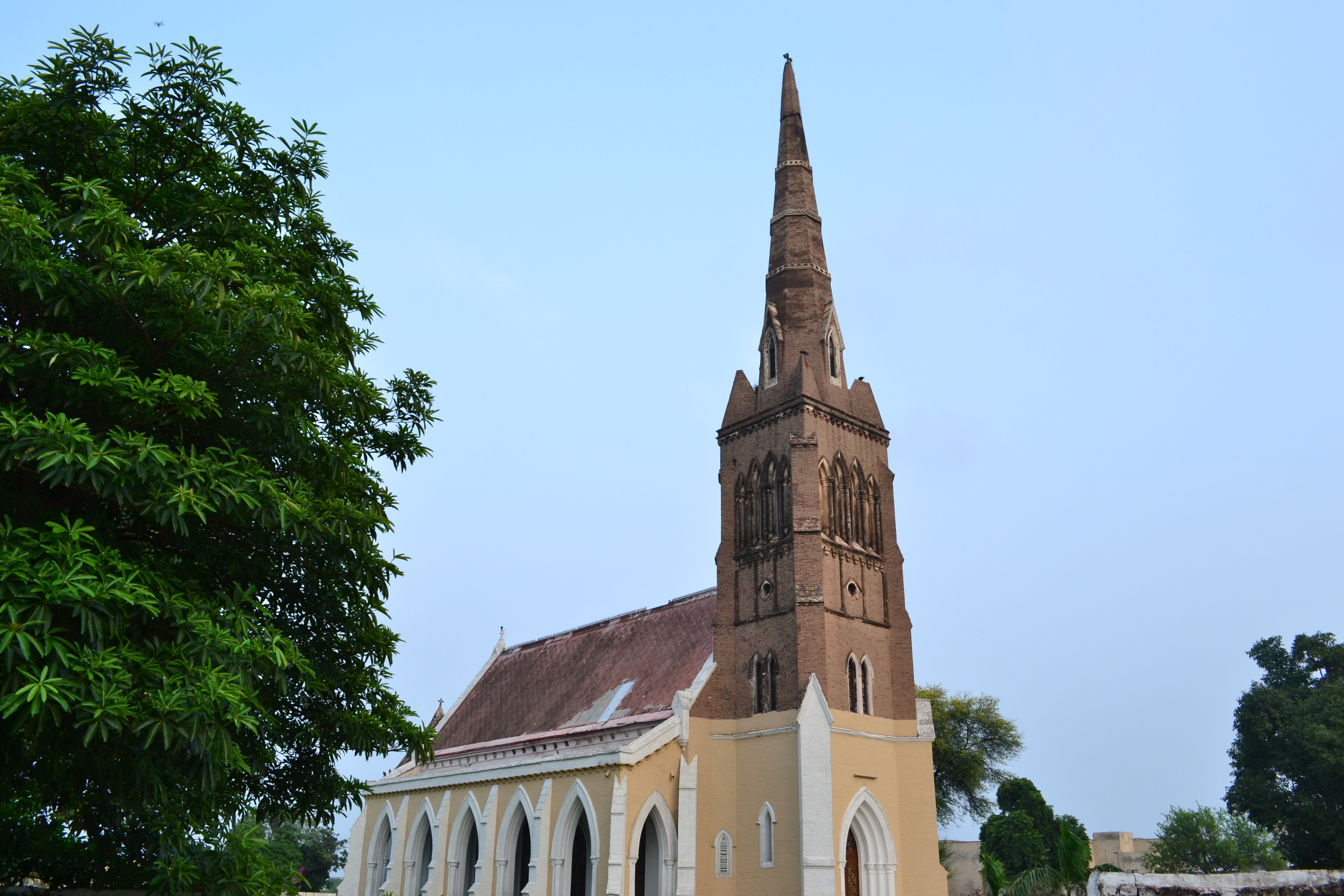
- A view of the St. John's Church, Jhelum
- St. John's Church
- 32°55′17″N 73°43′20″E
- Location: Jhelum, Punjab
- Country: Pakistan
- Denomination: Anglican

History
- Status: Parish church
- Founded: 1857
- Dedication: Saint John

Architecture
- Functional status: Active
- Style: Gothic Revival

Administration
- Diocese: Church of Pakistan

St John's Church (Urdu: سینٹ جانز چرچ) is a mid-nineteenth-century Anglican garrison church in Jhelum Cantonment, Punjab, Pakistan, standing a short walk north of the Jhelum River and the old rail bridge. Constructed as a memorial to British soldiers killed during the Indian Rebellion of 1857, the building is among the earliest surviving Christian places of worship in northern Punjab and is listed by the provincial government as a protected heritage landmark.

== History ==
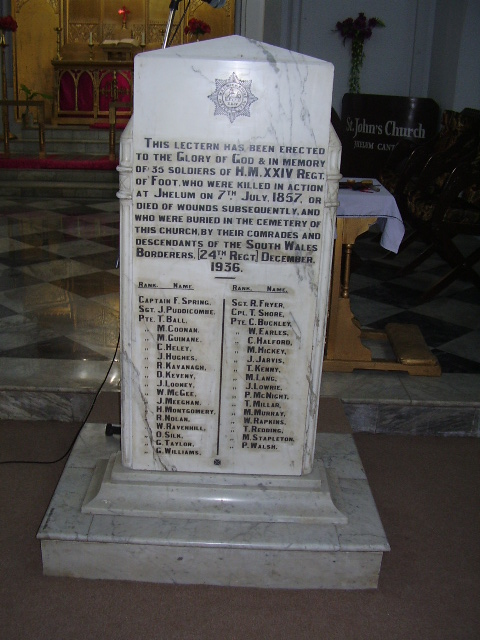
Marble Lectern at St. John's, Jhelum, in memory of 35 slain British soldiers

The church's origins are inseparable from the Indian Rebellion of 1857. On 7 July 1857, thirty-five men of the 24th Regiment of Foot were killed in Jhelum when part of the Bengal Native Infantry mutinied. Among the dead was Captain Francis Spring, the eldest son of Colonel William Spring. In the aftermath, the British Indian military set aside land inside the new cantonment for a memorial church.

Salman Rashid's heritage survey for UNESCO records that the building was consecrated on 7 February 1857 by the Bishop of Madras, even though construction continued for several seasons. Provincial tourism records date the formal completion to 1860. A carved marble lectern inside the nave carries the names of all thirty-five men who died in the skirmish, turning the sanctuary into a regimental shrine as well as a parish church.

During the early decades of Pakistan, the garrison congregation shrank and the building was locked; it then stood unused for roughly forty years. A Pakistan Army supported conservation effort in 2007 resulted in reopening of the church for worship and for visitors. The church now falls under the Diocese of Rawalpindi in the united Church of Pakistan and is also promoted by the Tourism Development Corporation of Punjab as part of Jhelum's heritage trail.

== Architecture ==
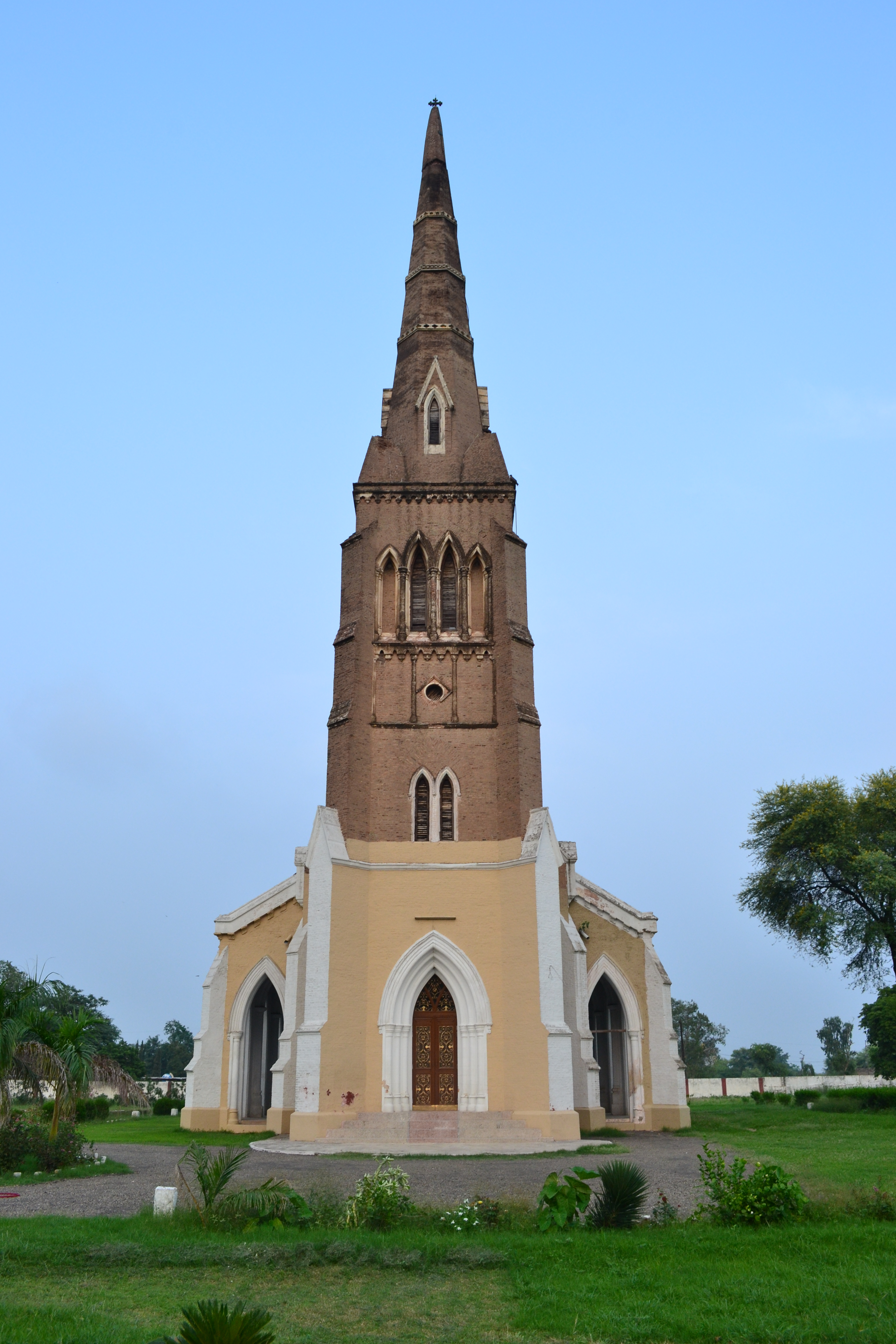
St. John's Church, Jhelum's spire

Although modest in size, St John’s exemplifies the Anglo-Gothic idiom that British military engineers favoured for cantonment churches across the Punjab plain in the 1850s. Rashid notes that "today one sees only the tall spire rising above the accretion of modern buildings", a landmark once framed by open meadows on the river bank. The rubble-stone walls are dressed with lime plaster; lancet windows, hood-moulds and buttresses echo contemporary garrison churches in Rawalpindi and Lahore that sought to evoke English parish models. Academic surveys of colonial church design in Punjab describe these buildings as single-nave halls with hammer-beam roofs, pointed clerestory lights and small western towers that double as ventilators in the hot season, traits all present, though on a reduced scale, at Jhelum.
