= Jhelum Cantonment =

Army cantonment in Punjab, Pakistan

Jhelum Cantonment جہلم ﮐﻴﻨٹ
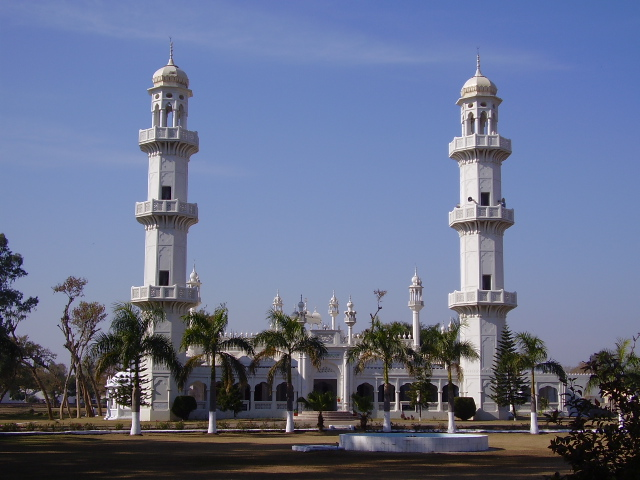
- Interactive map of Jhelum Cantonment
- Coordinates: 32.56°N 73.44°E
- Country: Pakistan
- Province: Punjab
- District: Jhelum
- Time zone: UTC+5 (PST)
- Postal code: 49600
- Calling code: +92-544
- Administrative Control; Cantonment Boad Jhelum

Jhelum Cantonment (Urdu/Punjabi: جہلم کنٹونمنٹ), commonly abbreviated to Jhelum Cantt (Urdu/Punjabi: جہلم ﮐﻴﻨٹ) is a cantonment adjacent to the city of Jhelum, in Punjab province, Pakistan.

It is one of the most important cantonments (army base) in the country, built in 1849 during the British rule of the Indian Subcontinent, and has grown into a strategically important garrison. It is the headquarters of the 23rd Infantry Division of the Pakistan Army, commanded by a Major General.

== Location ==
It is located on the GT Road (N-5) adjacent to the city of Jhelum at a distance of 121 km from the national capital Islamabad and 167 km from Lahore, the provincial capital of Punjab. Prominent nearby cities and towns include Mirpur, Azad Kashmir, Kharian, Sarai Alamgir, and Gujrat. The cantonment area is well planned and aesthetically maintained with an array of evergreen trees and seasonal flowers.

== History ==
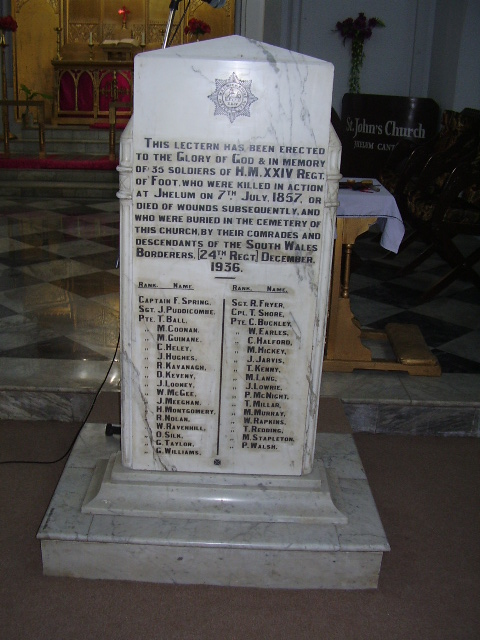
Marble lectern in memory of 35 British soldiers

During the British rule, Jhelum was chosen as the site of a cantonment and as the headquarters of the civil administration. For some years, it was the seat of the Commissioner of the Division, but in 1859 his headquarters were transferred to Rawalpindi. Under British rule, Jhelum had steadily advanced in prosperity; and it is the hub for most of the trade of the District. Although, since the completion of the Sind-Sāgar branch of the North-Western Railway; the salt trade no longer passes through it. It is an important timber dépôt, the timber from the Kashmir forests which is floated down the river being collected here. A good deal of boatbuilding is carried on. The cantonment, which is three miles from the civil station, contains a church and a post office. The normal strength of the garrison is one Native cavalry and four Native infantry regiments. The municipality was founded in 1867. During the ten years ending 1902–03, the receipts averaged Rs. 32,100, and the expenditure Rs, 31,900. Receipts and expenditure from cantonment funds in the same period averaged Rs. 31,900 and Rs. 6,100 respectively. The main source of income of the municipality in 1903-04 was Rs.34,200 chiefly from octroi; and the expenditure was Rs. 41,000. The town has two English-medium schools, a municipal high school, and a middle school maintained by the American Presbyterian Mission. Besides the civil hospital, the mission also maintains a hospital. The mission hospital was opened for women and children under the leadership of Winifred Heston in 1910.

During the Indian Rebellion of 1857, 35 British soldiers of HM XXIV regiment were killed by the local resistance. A lectern inside St. John's Church Jhelum the church shows the names of those 35 soldiers. St. John's Church is located in Jhelum cantonment Pakistan beside the river Jhelum. It was built in 1860 and is a landmark of the city. It is a Protestant church and was in use during the British period. For forty years, it remained closed. Now it has been renovated and opened to the public.

== Education ==
Jhelum Cantt. offers a number of education institutes for basic, intermediate as well as the higher education. The schools and colleges include:

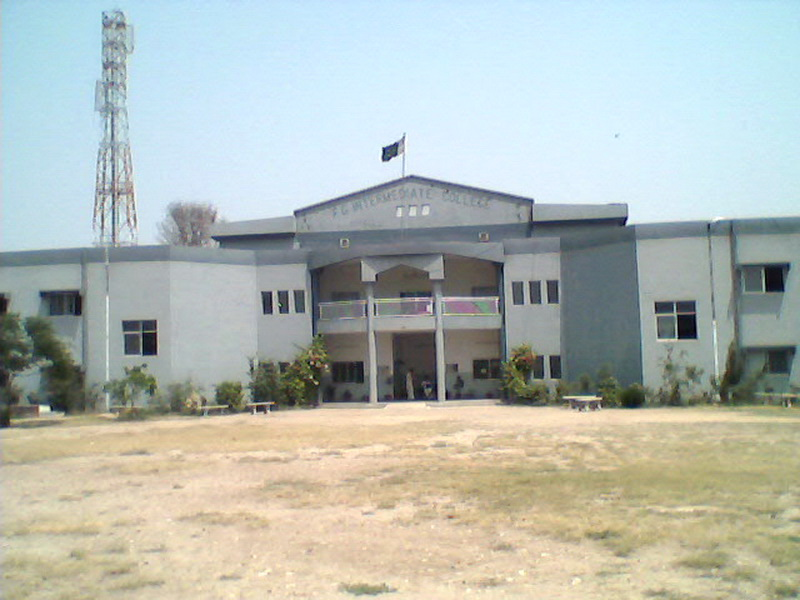
FG College

- Army Public School and College Jhelum Cantt.
- Fauji Foundation Model School & College, Jhelum Cantt.
- FG Boys Public Secondary School Jhelum Cantt
- FG Girls Public Secondary School Jhelum Cantt
- FG Boys High School Jhelum Cantt
- Presentation Convent School, Jhelum Cantt
- St. Thomas' High School, Jhelum Cantt
- Cantonment Board Public School

In addition, there are a number of good schools in the city of Jhelum and the neighborhood of the cantonment, including the Beaconhouse School Systems and The City School. Pakistan Military Academy major cadet feeding institute, Military College Jhelum, is located at a distance of 5 km at Sarai Alamgir.

== Sports ==
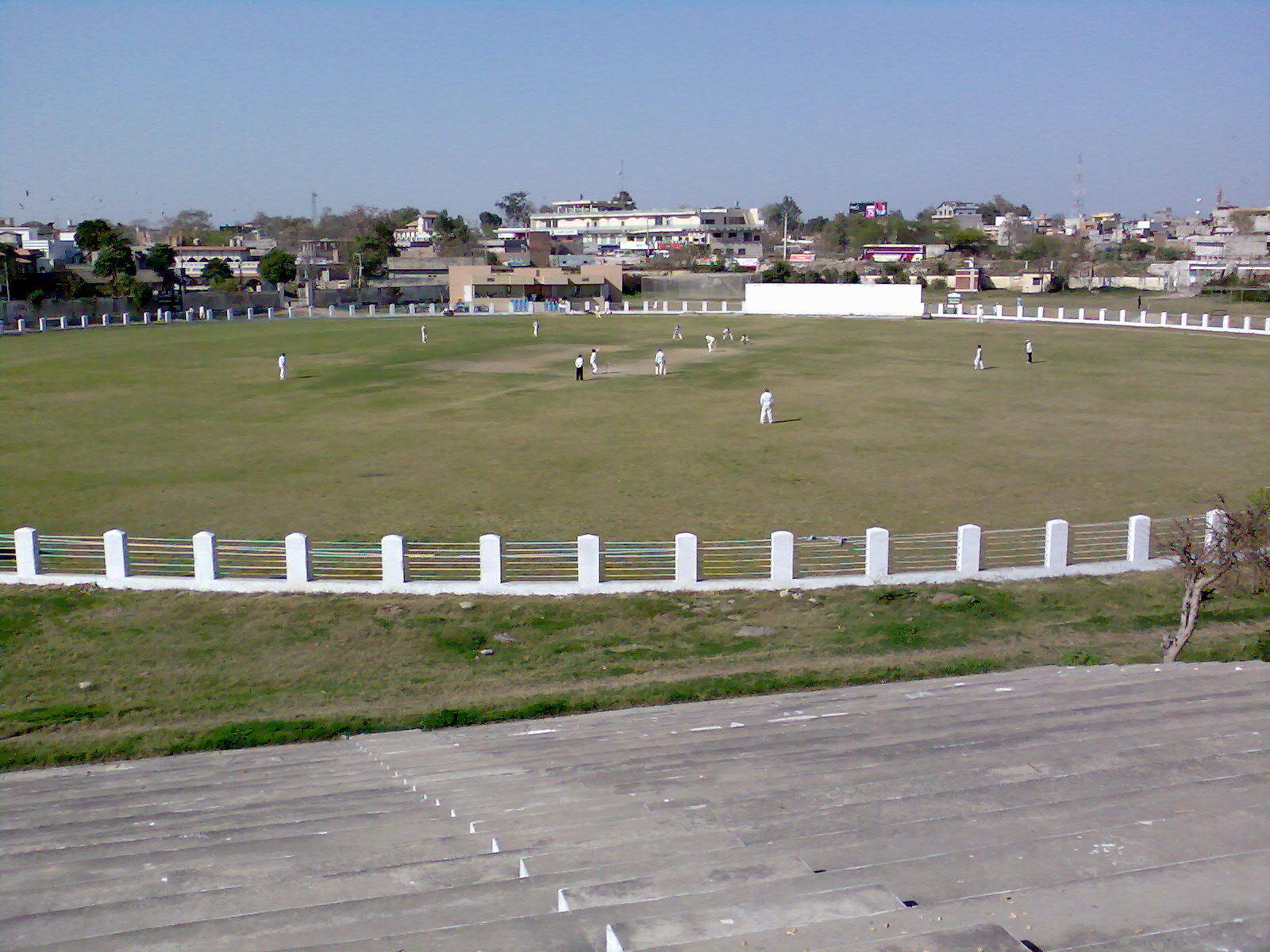
Cricket Stadium Jhelum

The Jhelum Cantt has an eighteen-hole golf course called the River-View Golf Club, where national golf tournaments are held regularly. There are a variety of sports facilities available within the cantonment which include grounds for cricket, hockey, football, tennis and squash courts and swimming pools. Zamir Jaffri Cricket Stadium is also adjacent to the Gul Afshan Colony Jhelum Cantt.

== Parks ==
The cantonment has several parks and outdoor community spaces, including an amusement park.

== Health facilities ==
The cantonment has a military-run, "B" class standard, 500-bed teaching hospital known as Combined Military Hospital (CMH Jhelum). There is a plan to establish a medical college in the vicinity of the hospital.

== Shopping ==
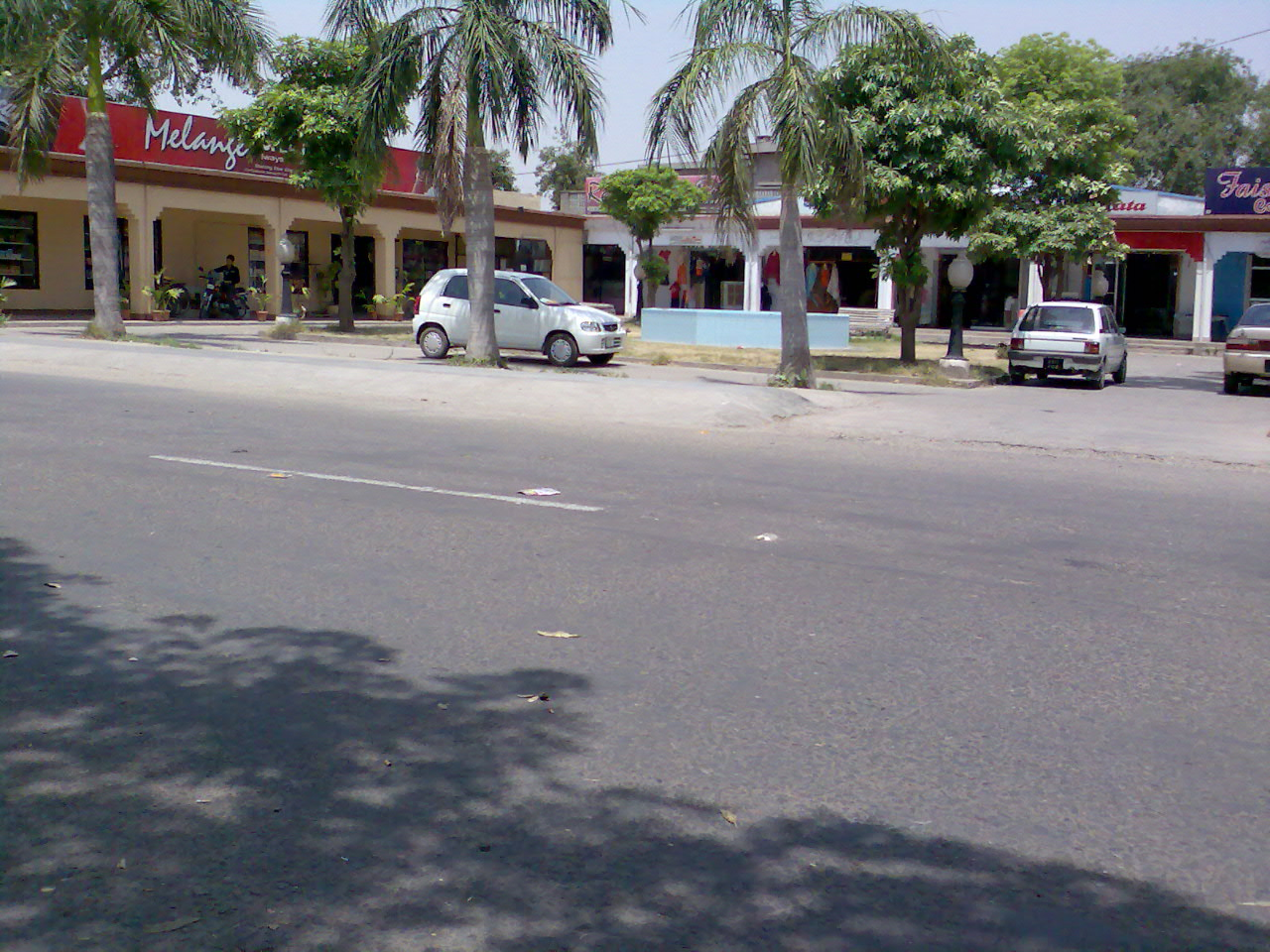
Front view of Melange super Market

The cantonment has number of markets with small to medium shopping stores offering variety of products.

== See also ==
- List of cities in Pakistan
- List of cities in Punjab (Pakistan)
- Army Cantonment Board
- Cantonment
- Jhelum
- Mangla Cantt
