= Jhelum =

City in Punjab, Pakistan

Jhelum جہلم
- City
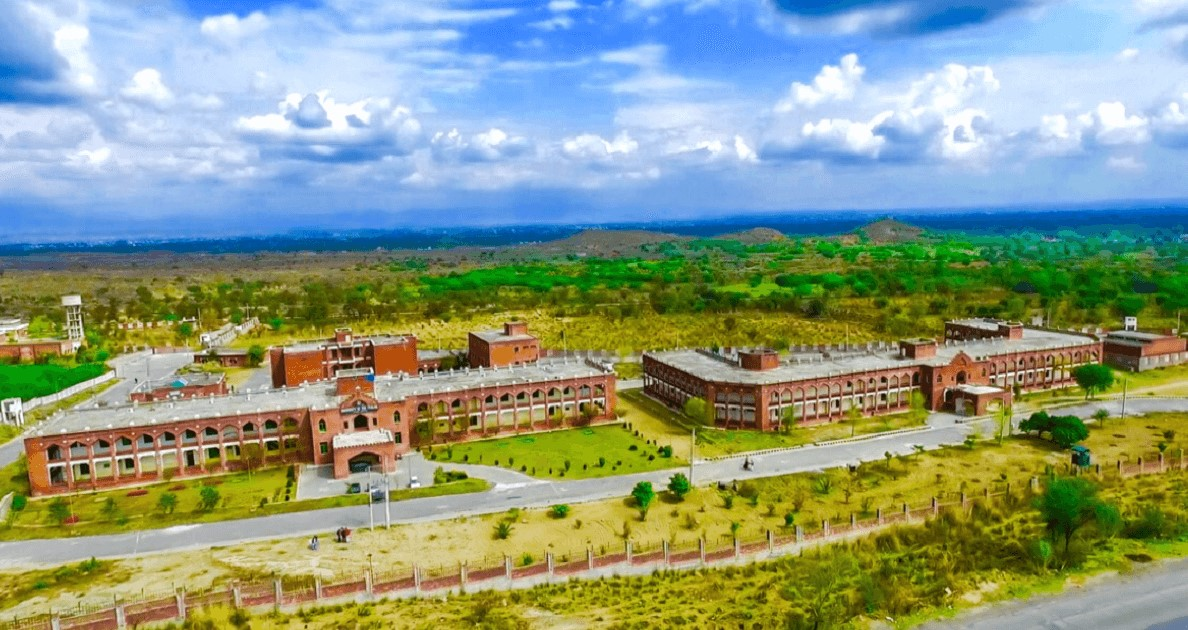
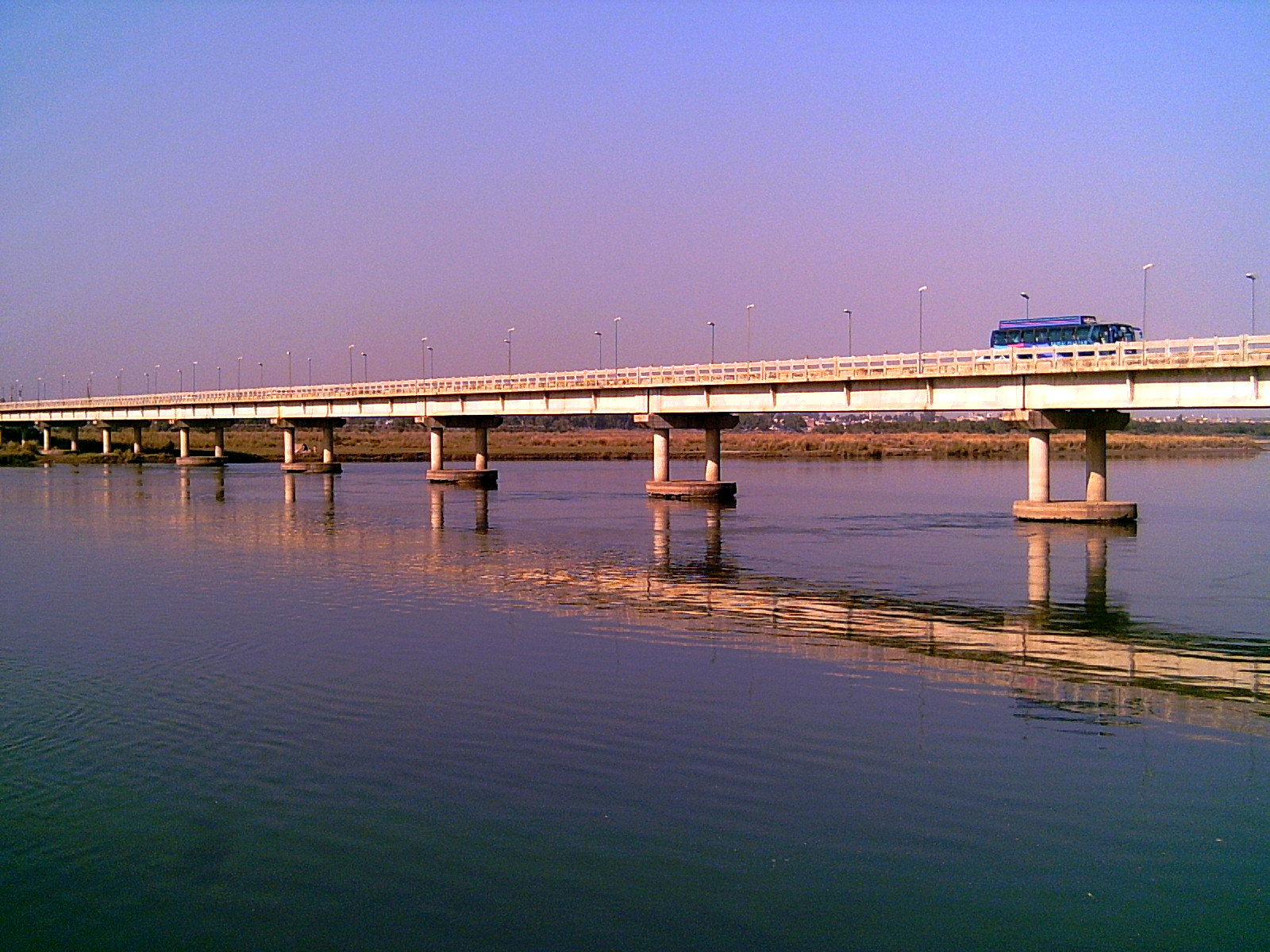
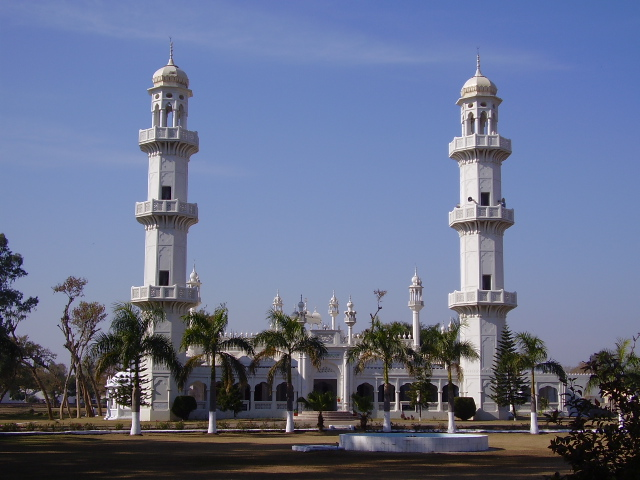
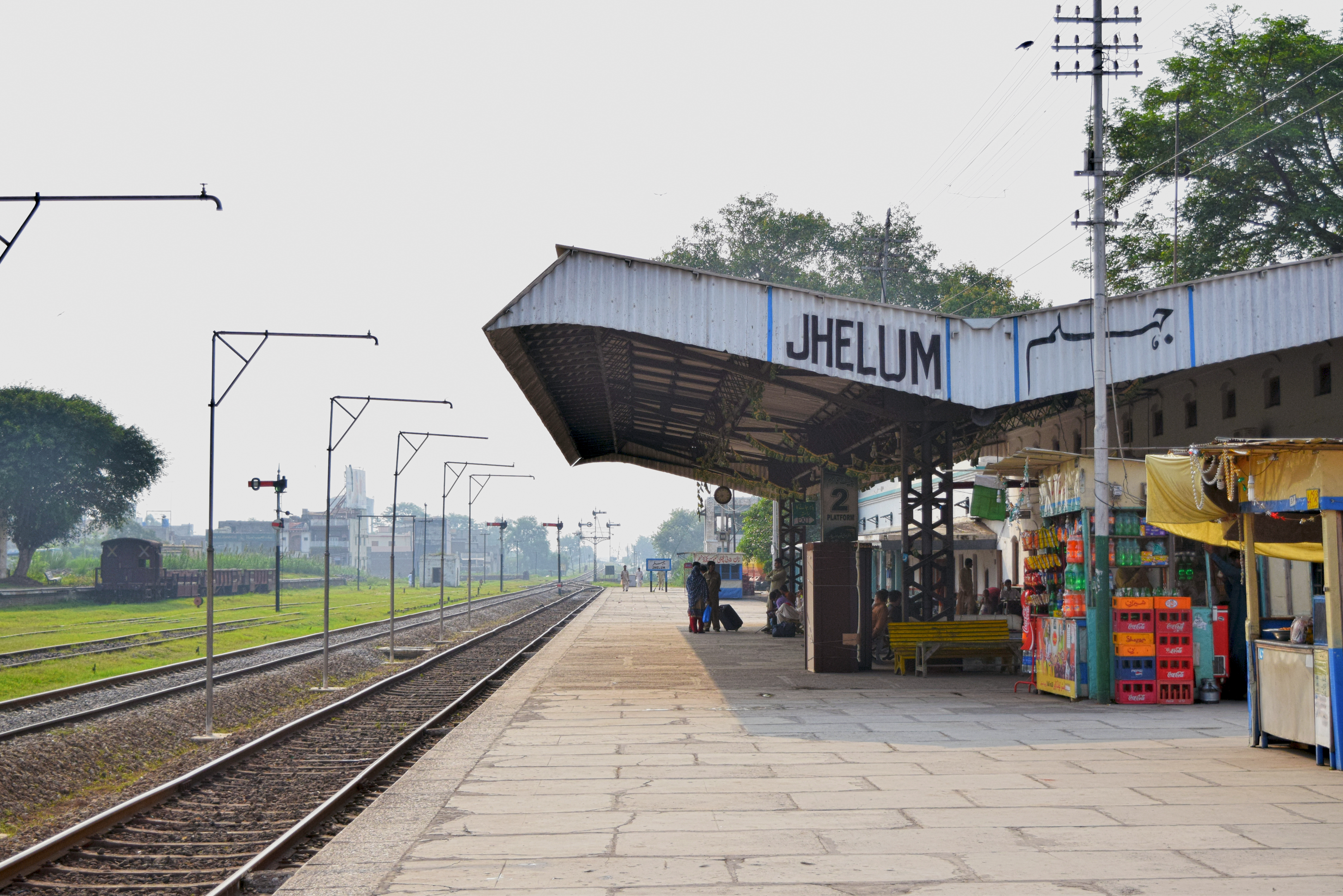
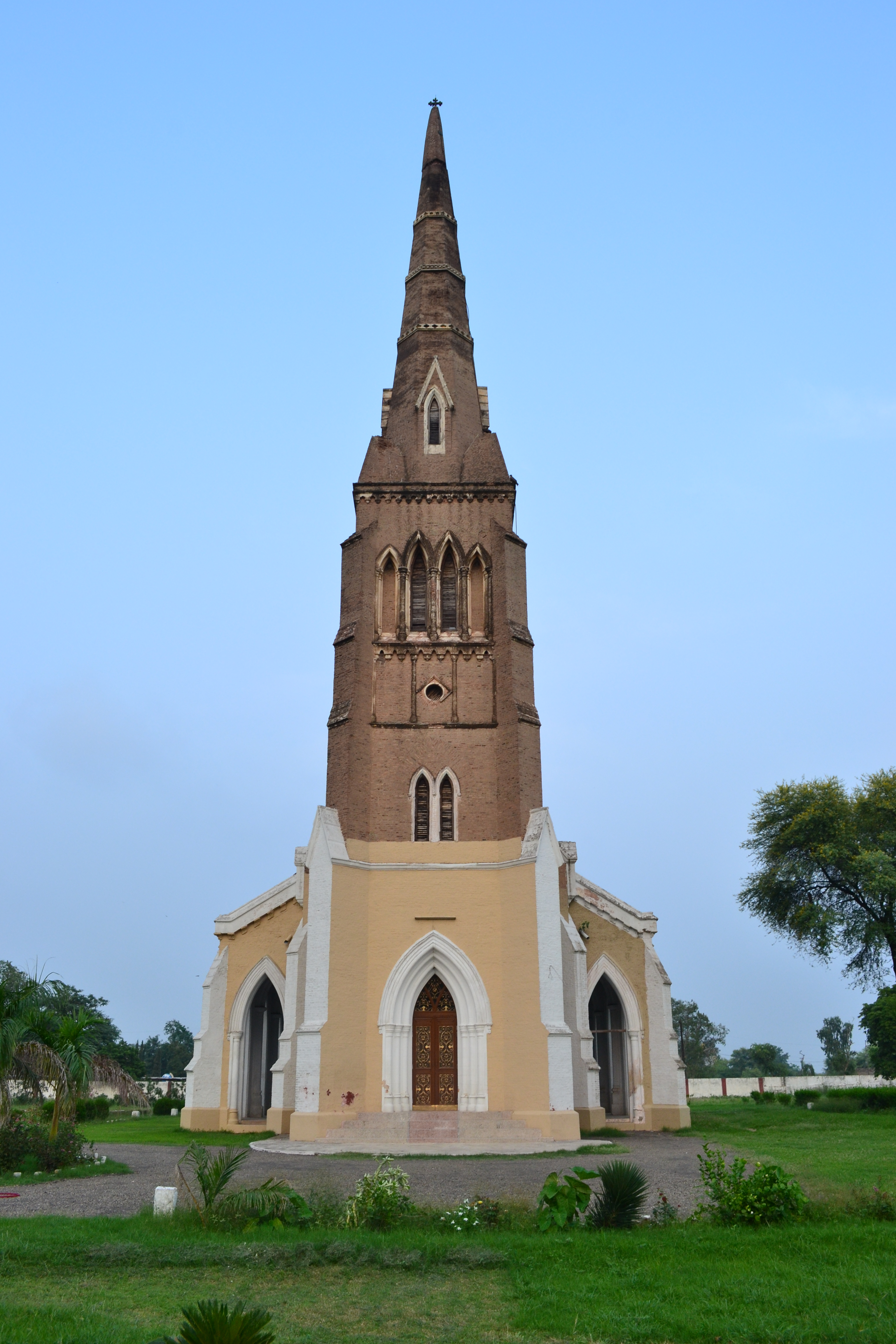
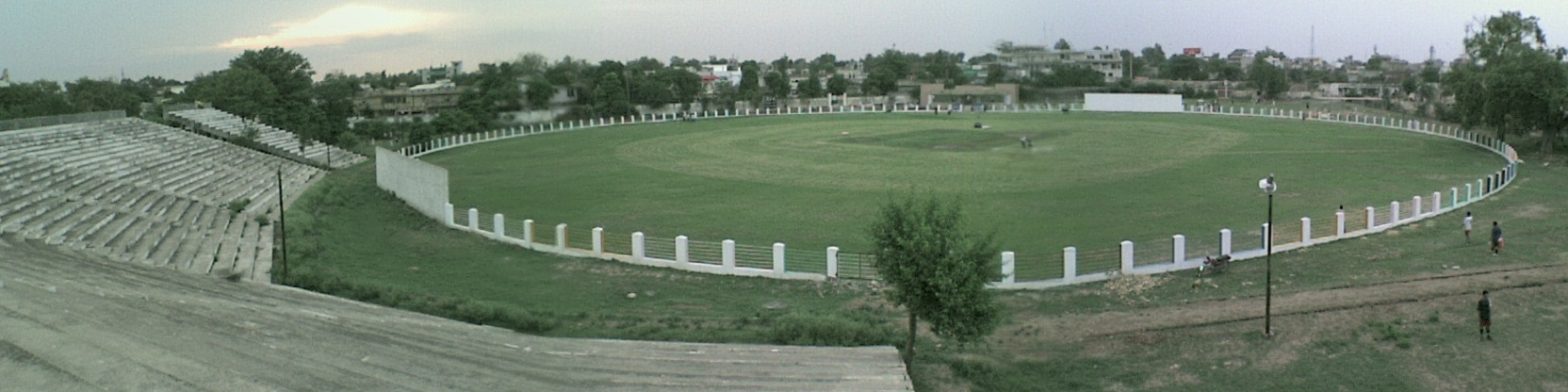
- University of the Punjab, Jhelum Jhelum Bridge Cantonment Mosque Jhelum railway station St. John's Church Jhelum Cricket Stadium
- Nicknames: City of Soldiers; Land of Martyrs and Warriors
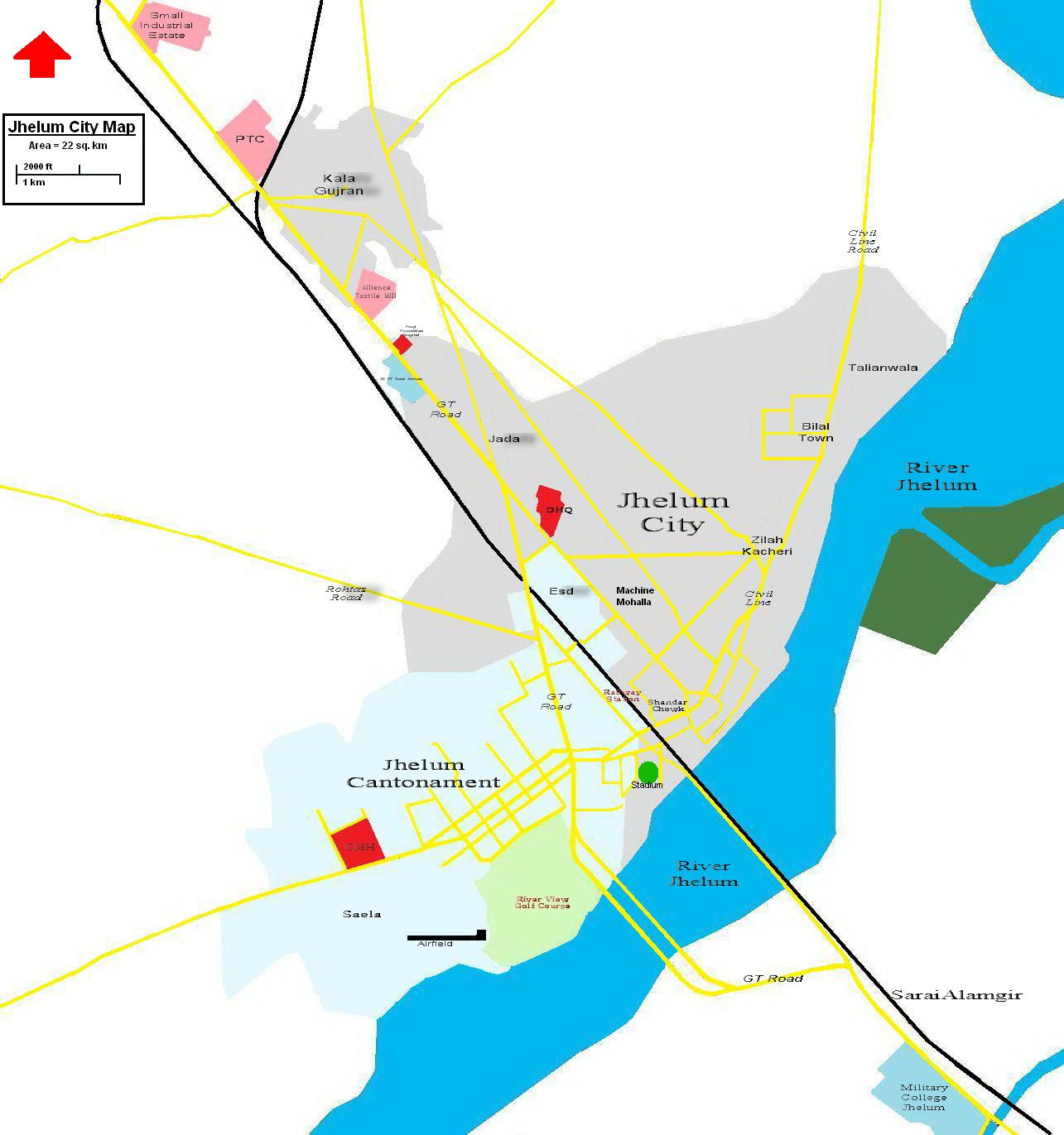
- Map of Jhelum City

- Location within Punjab, Pakistan Jhelum (Pakistan)
- Coordinates: 32°56′33″N 73°43′32″E
- Country: Pakistan
- Province: Punjab
- Division: Rawalpindi
- District: Jhelum
- Founded: Before BC
- Union Councils: 7

Government
  - Mayor: None (vacant)
  - Deputy Commissioner: Samiullah Farooq (PAS)
  - District Police Officer: Shafique Ahmad Chaudhary (PSP)

Area
  - City: 50 km^{2} (19 sq mi)
- Elevation: 233 m (764 ft)

Population (2023)
  - City: 312,426
  - Rank: 31st, Pakistan; 21st, Punjab
  - Demonym: Jhelumi

Languages
  - Official: English; Urdu
  - Spoken: Punjabi (89%); Urdu (4%); Pashto (3%) others (4%)
- Time zone: UTC+5 (PKT)
- Postal code: 49600
- Dialling code: 0544

Jhelum (also known as Jehlum) (/ˈdʒiːləm/; Punjabi / Urdu: جہلم) is a city on the western bank of the Jhelum River in Punjab, Pakistan. Located in northern Punjab, it is the capital of the Jhelum District. The city is nicknamed the "City of Soldiers" or "Land of Martyrs and Warriors" since many soldiers from the area served in the British Indian Army and later, the Pakistan Armed Forces, due to characterisation of Punjabi tribes as a 'martial race'.

Jhelum is several miles upstream from the site of the ancient Battle of the Hydaspes between the armies of Alexander III of Macedon and Porus. The location of the modern city of Jhelum could conceivably have been the site of the capital of Paurava. The name of the nearby city Bucephala commemorates the death of Alexander's horse, Bucephalus. (Note: Jhelum, Pakistan (Alexandria Bucephalus/Bucephala), "A river, believed to be the Hydaspes mentioned by Alexander III the Great and which he reached in 326 BC, and a city originally called Alexandria Bucephalus, or more commonly Bucephala, to commemorate the noble horse that carried Alexander III for seventeen years and died here. The ancient city lay on the east bank of the river, whereas the present city lies on the west bank...") Other notable areas nearby include the 16th-century Rohtas Fort and the Tilla Jogian complex of ancient temples. The ancient Grand Trunk Road passes through the city. According to the 2023 Pakistani census, the population of Jhelum was 312,426. Today, there are a number of industries in Jhelum, including a tobacco factory and wood, marble, glass and flour mills.

== Etymology ==
According to the Concise Dictionary of World-Place Names, the name Jhelum is derived from Jal meaning ‘pure water’ and Ham meaning ‘snow’. This refers to the water flowing through the Jhelum River that originates from the snow-covered Himalayas. Historian Anjum Sultan Shahbaz recorded some theories about the name Jhelum in his book Tareekh-e-Jhelum thus:

Many writers have different opinions about the name of Jhelum. One suggestion is that in ancient days Jhelumabad was known as Jalham. The word Jhelum is reportedly derived from the words Jal (pure water) and Ham (snow). The name thus refers to the waters of a river (flowing beside the city) which has its origin in the snow-capped Himalayas.

However, some writers believe that when "Dara-e-Azam" reached a certain place on the river bank after winning many battles, he fixed his flag at that place and called it "Ja-e-Alam" which means "Place of the Flag". With the passage of time it became Jhelum from "Ja-e-Alam".

According to tradition, Saeed Bin Abi Waqas, brother of Saad Bin Abi Waqas, was sent to China to preach Islam, during his journey he arrived at the city of Jhelum, he saw the reflection of a city in the river and said "هذا جهيلم" (this is Jhelum), which means "City besides the river, in full moonlight".

Ahmed Shah Abdali also used "Jheelum" in place of Jhelum and "Harian" for Kharian in his diary.

== History ==
=== Ancient ===
Rajput, Gurjar, Labana, and Arain settlers were the earliest inhabitants of Jhelum. The city was the site of the Battle of the Hydaspes between Alexander III of Macedon and the local ruler of the region, Porus the Elder. Abisares (or Abhisara; in Greek Αβισαρης), called Embisarus (Eμ Oβισαρoς) by Diodorus, was an Indian king of the Abhira tribe. His descent was beyond the river Hydaspes, whose territory lay in the mountains. He sent embassies to Alexander both before and after the conquest of Porus in 326 BC, although he was inclined to espouse the side of the latter. Alexander not only allowed him to retain his kingdom but also expanded it, and upon his death, appointed his son as his successor. Porus' kingdom, Paurava, was on the left bank of the Jhelum River, corresponding to the limits of the present Gujrat District. The Gakhars appear to represent an early wave of conquerors from the west, who still inhabit a large tract in the mountains north of the Tilla range. Gakhars were the dominant race during the early Muslim era, and they continued to retain their independence for a long period, both in Jhelum and in the neighboring district of Rawalpindi.

=== Medieval ===
In 997 CE, Sultan Mahmud Ghaznavi took over the Ghaznavid dynasty empire which had been established by his father, Sultan Sebuktegin. In 1005, he conquered the Shahis in Kabul and followed it by conquests of the Punjab region, including Jhelum. The Delhi Sultanate and later the Mughal Empire ruled the area. The Punjab region became predominantly Muslim due to missionary Sufi saints whose dargahs dot the landscape.

The Mughals were Persianized Turks who claimed descent from both Timur and Genghis Khan and strengthened the Persianate culture of Muslim India. Being very few in number, the main families of Mughal Barlas, descendants of Amir Timur, settled in Mong Rasool and afterward scattered to the villages of Chak Nazar, Shamaspur, Aima Afghana, Khardiyala, Chak Sikander, Malhar Muglain, Mota Garbi, and Bhimber. They adopted a policy of converting the local Jats and Gakhars, which was mandatory, as recorded in the Baburnama. Thus, it is the Mughals who were largely responsible for the conversion of the Jats to Islam.

=== Later periods ===
After the decline of the Mughal Empire, the region fell to the Durrani Empire. After the Third Battle of Panipat, the newly emerging Sikh Empire invaded and occupied the Jhelum District in 1808 from its Gakhar ruler, Sultan Muqarrab Khan. In 1849, Jhelum passed with the rest of the Sikh territories to the British Raj. The British conquered Jhelum in 1849 with the assistance of the local Gakhars who resented Sikh rule.

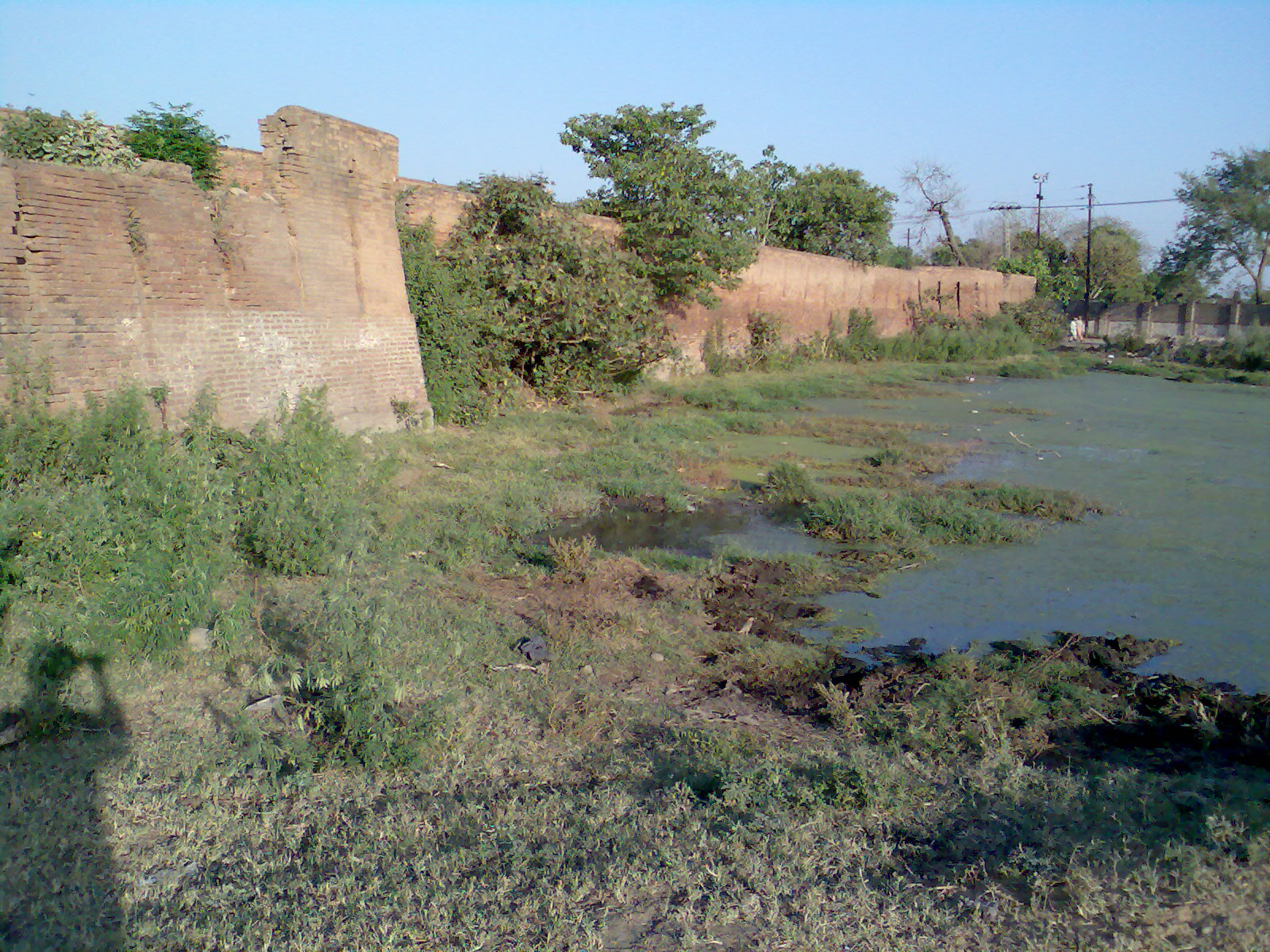
A Sikh-era fort in Jhelum City

=== British Raj ===
During British rule, Jhelum was connected by the North-Western Railway to other cities in the Indian Empire: 1,367 miles from Calcutta, 1,413 from Bombay, and 849 from Karachi. According to the 1901 census, the population was 14,951 people.

The Imperial Gazetteer of India described Jhelum:

The present town is of modern origin, the old town, which may have been the Bucephala of Alexander, having been, on the left or opposite bank of the river. Under Sikh rule, the place was quite unimportant, being mainly occupied by a settlement of boatmen, and at the time of annexation contained about 500 houses. It was then chosen as the site of a cantonment and as the headquarters of the civil administration. For some years, it was the seat of the Commissioner of the Division, but in 1859, his headquarters were transferred to Rawalpindi. Under British rule, Jhelum has steadily advanced in prosperity and is the entrepôt for most of the trade of the District, though, since the completion of the Sind-Sāgar branch of the North-Western Railway, the salt trade no longer passes through it. It is an important timber dépôt, the timber from the Kashmir forests, which is floated down the river and is collected here. A good deal of boat-building is carried on. The cantonment, which is 3 miles from the civil station, contains the church and post office. The normal strength of the garrison is one Native cavalry and four Native infantry regiments. The municipality was founded in 1867. During the ten years ending 1902–3, the receipts averaged Rs. 32,100, and the expenditure Rs. 31,900. Receipts and expenditure from cantonment funds in the same period averaged Rs. 31,900 and Rs. 6,100, respectively. The chief income of the municipality in 1903-4 was Rs. 34,200 chiefly from octroi; and the expenditure was Rs. 41,000. The town has two Anglo vernacular schools, a municipal high school, and a middle school maintained by the American Presbyterian Mission. Besides the civil hospital, the mission also maintains a hospital.

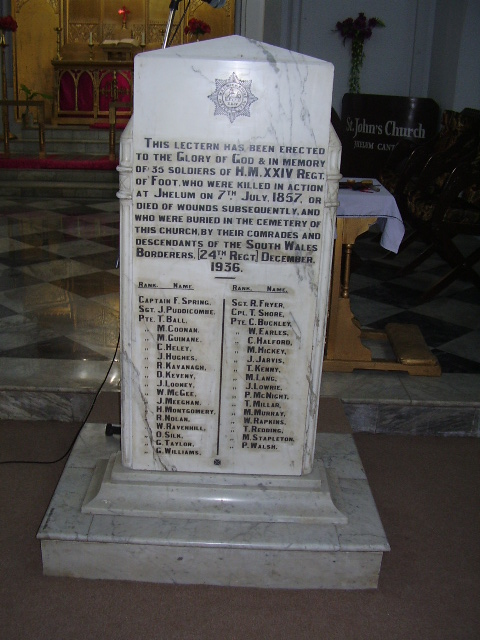
Marble lectern in memory of 35 British soldiers

During the Mutiny of 1857, 35 British soldiers of the Regular 24th Regiment of Foot were killed at the Battle of Jhelum by mutineers from the Honourable East India Company's 14th Bengal Native Infantry (roughly 500 of the soldiers mutinied, with roughly 100 of the Sikh soldiers remaining loyal). Among the dead was Captain Francis Spring, the eldest son of Colonel William Spring. A lectern inside St John's Church shows the names of those 35 soldiers. St John's Church is located beside the river Jhelum and remains a landmark in the city. It was built in 1860 as a Protestant church and was in use throughout the British period. For forty years, it was closed to the public and in poor condition; however, in 2007, it was renovated and reopened and is now maintained.

The British soldier William Connolly won a Victoria Cross for his bravery during this battle. Mirza Dildar Baig, also known as Khaki Shah, took part in the mutiny at Jhelum and was later celebrated by Indian Nationalists. He was captured and arrested with the remaining mutineers by authorities in Kashmir and later hanged near the river Jhelum. His grave is in a shrine in Jhelum Dildarnagar, and a small town in Uttar Pradesh is also named after him.

The railway bridge on the river Jhelum was built in 1873 by the British engineer William St. John Galwey. He also made the great Empress Victoria Bridge over the river Sutlej. During World War I, the Jhelum District "stood first" among districts in recruiting for the British war effort, with greater financial assistance from the British government channeled into the area in return.

=== Independence ===
The predominantly Muslim population supported the Muslim League and the Pakistan Movement. After the independence of Pakistan in 1947, the minority Hindus and Sikhs migrated to India, while Muslim refugees from India settled down in the Jhelum District.

== Administration ==
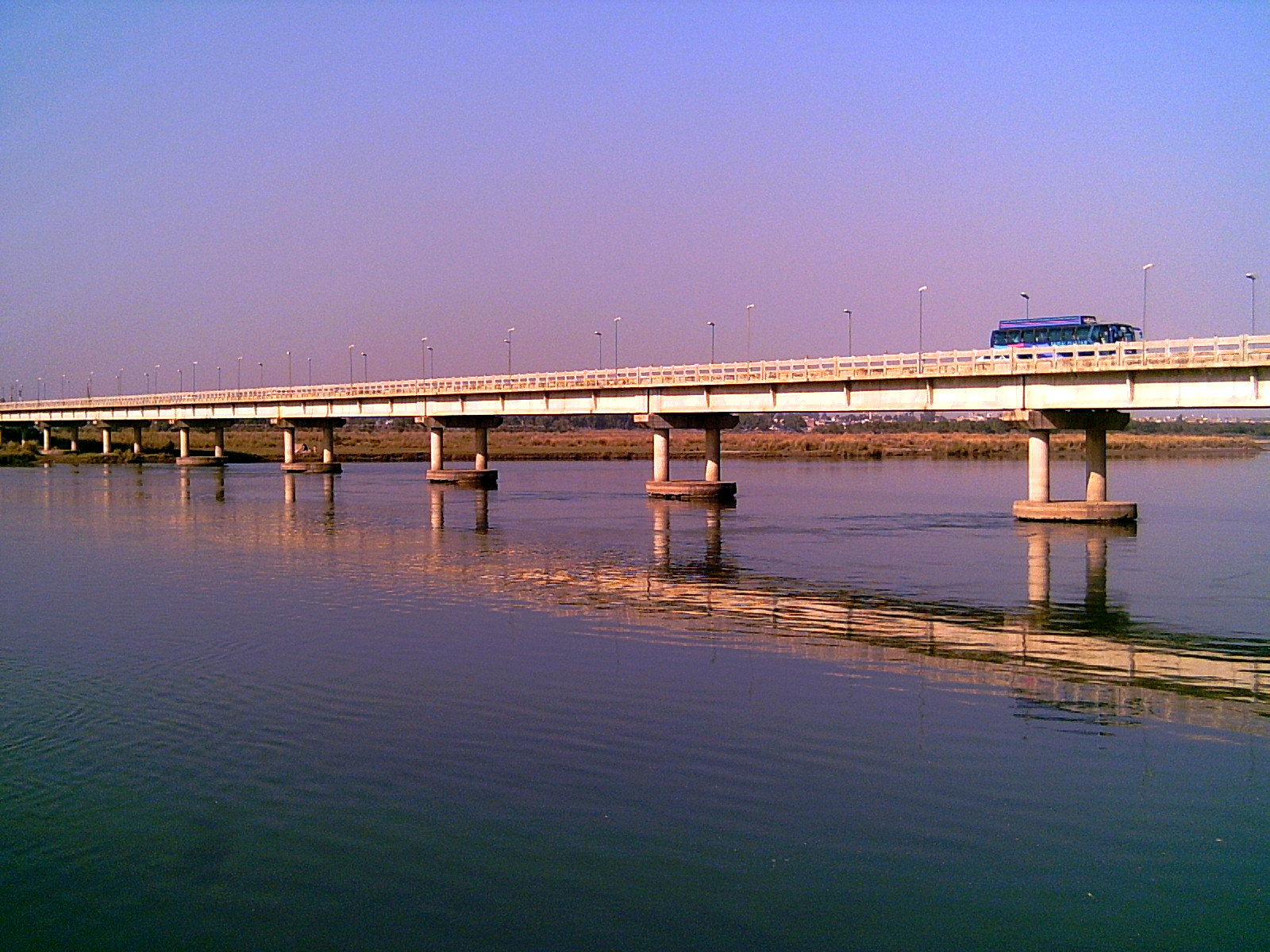
The River Jhelum below the bridge from the Sarai Alamgir side

As well as being district capital, Jhelum city is also the headquarters of Jhelum Tehsil. The city of Jhelum is administratively subdivided into seven union councils: Jhelum-I, Jhelum-II, Jhelum-III, Jhelum-IV, Jhelum-V, Jhelum-VI and Jhelum-VII.

== Demographics ==
Population

Historical population

| Year | Pop. | ±% p.a. |
|---|---|---|
| 1951 | 38,567 | — |
| 1961 | 52,585 | +3.15% |
| 1972 | 70,157 | +2.66% |
| 1981 | 106,462 | +4.74% |

| Year | Pop. | ±% p.a. |
|---|---|---|
| 1998 | 147,392 | +1.93% |
| 2017 | 190,425 | +1.36% |
| 2023 | 312,426 | +8.60% |

As of the 2023 census of Pakistan, the population of Jhelum city, including the Jhelum cantonment, was about 312,426 people. It is the 31st-largest city of Pakistan with respect to population. The total area of the city is about 50 km^{2} (19 sq mi). The population density is 261 people per sq. km, and the population growth rate is 8.96. The majority of the population, 98.47%, percent is Muslim. Of the minorities in Jhelum, Christians are the largest, making up 1.36% of the district's population.

The literacy rate of Jhelum is among the highest in Pakistan. At 79%, it is only lower than that of Islamabad and neighbouring Rawalpindi, and is somewhat higher than the average literacy in Punjab province (58%). The literacy rate has increased from 38.9% in 1981. The rate is much higher in the urban areas for both males and females. 84% of the population have electricity and 96% have access to water. The Human Development Index of Jhelum is 0.770, which is the highest in Pakistan after Karachi.

Religious groups in Jhelum City (1881−2017) (Note: 1881-1941: Data for the entirety of the town of Jhelum, which included Jhelum Municipality and Jhelum Cantonment.)
| Religious group | 1881 | | 1891 | | 1901 | | 1911 | | 1921 | | 1931 | | 1941 | | 2017 | |
| Religious group | Pop. | % | Pop. | % | Pop. | % | Pop. | % | Pop. | % | Pop. | % | Pop. | % | Pop. | % |
|---|---|---|---|---|---|---|---|---|---|---|---|---|---|---|---|---|
| Islam | 11,369 | 53.86% | 7,373 | 57.25% | 8,322 | 55.66% | 10,470 | 53.21% | 10,816 | 59.89% | 13,980 | 59.49% | 19,416 | 58.5% | 185,323 | 97.3% |
| Hinduism (Note: 1931-1941: Including Ad-Dharmis) | 7,966 | 37.74% | 4,250 | 33% | 4,350 | 29.1% | 5,824 | 29.6% | 5,379 | 29.78% | 6,304 | 26.83% | 8,936 | 26.92% | 50 | 0.03% |
| Sikhism | 1,460 | 6.92% | 1,064 | 8.26% | 2,074 | 13.87% | 3,029 | 15.39% | 1,497 | 8.29% | 2,581 | 10.98% | 3,950 | 11.9% | —N/a | —N/a |
| Jainism | 0 | 0% | 28 | 0.22% | 15 | 0.1% | 25 | 0.13% | 33 | 0.18% | 69 | 0.29% | 146 | 0.44% | —N/a | —N/a |
| Christianity | —N/a | —N/a | 153 | 1.19% | 190 | 1.27% | 326 | 1.66% | 334 | 1.85% | 565 | 2.4% | 619 | 1.86% | 4,560 | 2.39% |
| Zoroastrianism | —N/a | —N/a | 9 | 0.07% | 0 | 0% | 3 | 0.02% | 1 | 0.01% | 0 | 0% | —N/a | —N/a | —N/a | —N/a |
| Judaism | —N/a | —N/a | 1 | 0.01% | 0 | 0% | 1 | 0.01% | 0 | 0% | 0 | 0% | —N/a | —N/a | —N/a | —N/a |
| Buddhism | —N/a | —N/a | 0 | 0% | 0 | 0% | 0 | 0% | 0 | 0% | 0 | 0% | —N/a | —N/a | —N/a | —N/a |
| Ahmadiyya | —N/a | —N/a | —N/a | —N/a | —N/a | —N/a | —N/a | —N/a | —N/a | —N/a | —N/a | —N/a | —N/a | —N/a | 533 | 0.28% |
| Others | 312 | 1.48% | 0 | 0% | 0 | 0% | 0 | 0% | 0 | 0% | 0 | 0% | 124 | 0.37% | 5 | 0% |
| Total population | 21,107 | 100% | 12,878 | 100% | 14,951 | 100% | 19,678 | 100% | 18,060 | 100% | 23,499 | 100% | 33,191 | 100% | 190,471 | 100% |

=== Language ===
Urban population Jhelum Tehsil
1. Punjabi (83.0%)
2. Urdu (10.7%)
3. Pashto (4.37%)
4. Other (1.84%)

In the 2023 census, 83.05% of the population identified their mother tongue as Punjabi, 10.74% identified Urdu, 4.37% identified Pashto, while 1.84% spoke other minor languages (mostly Sindhi and Saraiki).

== Geography ==
Lying at 32°56′ North latitude and 73°44′ East longitude, Jhelum is located a 1 hour and 30 minute drive from the capital of Pakistan, Islamabad, and a 3 hour drive from the capital of Punjab, Lahore. Jhelum is linked with these cities through the National Highway N-5. Several cities are within 1 to 2 hours drive including Gujrat (home to fan manufacturing), Gujranwala, Chakwal, and Mirpur.

=== Climate ===
Jhelum has a monsoon-influenced humid subtropical climate (Köppen Cwa) and is extremely hot and humid in summer, and pleasant and generally dry in winter. The maximum recorded temperature in the pre-monsoon season of April to June is 49.2 °C (120.6 °F), whereas in winter the lowest temperature recorded is −0.6 °C (30.9 °F). The average annual rainfall is about 900 millimetres (35 in), which is much below the required level given the extremely high evaporation levels. Nevertheless, in the rainy season, water torrents flow from the north to the Jhelum River very rapidly and cause damage to the crops, bridges, and roads. This is responsible for the soil erosion in the district.

Over the years, global climate change has affected Jhelum as well as any other place on Earth. Below, comparison charts from Weatherbase and NOAA show the difference in rainfall between 1990 and 2015:

Climate data for Jhelum (1991-2020)
| Month | Jan | Feb | Mar | Apr | May | Jun | Jul | Aug | Sep | Oct | Nov | Dec | Year |
|---|---|---|---|---|---|---|---|---|---|---|---|---|---|
| Mean daily maximum °C (°F) | 18.9 (66.0) | 22.2 (72.0) | 27.4 (81.3) | 33.5 (92.3) | 38.7 (101.7) | 39.9 (103.8) | 36.1 (97.0) | 34.8 (94.6) | 34.6 (94.3) | 32.7 (90.9) | 27.3 (81.1) | 21.8 (71.2) | 30.7 (87.3) |
| Daily mean °C (°F) | 12.1 (53.8) | 15.4 (59.7) | 20.4 (68.7) | 25.9 (78.6) | 31.0 (87.8) | 33.0 (91.4) | 31.2 (88.2) | 30.3 (86.5) | 29.2 (84.6) | 25.1 (77.2) | 19.1 (66.4) | 14.0 (57.2) | 23.9 (75.0) |
| Mean daily minimum °C (°F) | 5.3 (41.5) | 8.5 (47.3) | 13.2 (55.8) | 18.3 (64.9) | 23.2 (73.8) | 26.0 (78.8) | 26.2 (79.2) | 25.8 (78.4) | 23.7 (74.7) | 17.5 (63.5) | 10.9 (51.6) | 6.3 (43.3) | 17.1 (62.8) |
| Average precipitation mm (inches) | 41.5 (1.63) | 58.6 (2.31) | 58.2 (2.29) | 43.5 (1.71) | 27.1 (1.07) | 67.3 (2.65) | 254.5 (10.02) | 235.0 (9.25) | 98.0 (3.86) | 22.9 (0.90) | 10.1 (0.40) | 16.1 (0.63) | 915.8 (36.06) |
| Average precipitation days (≥ 1.0 mm) | 3.9 | 4.9 | 4.9 | 4.8 | 4.0 | 5.8 | 12.0 | 10.4 | 5.5 | 2.3 | 1.2 | 1.4 | 61.1 |
| Average relative humidity (%) | 66 | 61 | 58 | 49 | 39 | 43 | 67 | 73 | 66 | 59 | 63 | 67 | 59 |
| Mean monthly sunshine hours | — | — | — | — | — | 265.2 | 232.4 | 230.9 | — | — | 219.2 | 194.8 | — |
Source: NOAA, Deutscher Wetterdienst (humidity, 1961-1995)

=== Major floods ===
The biggest floods in Jhelum in recent years were in 1992. Jhelum city and surrounding areas were almost completely submerged under flood waters.

== Transport and tourism ==
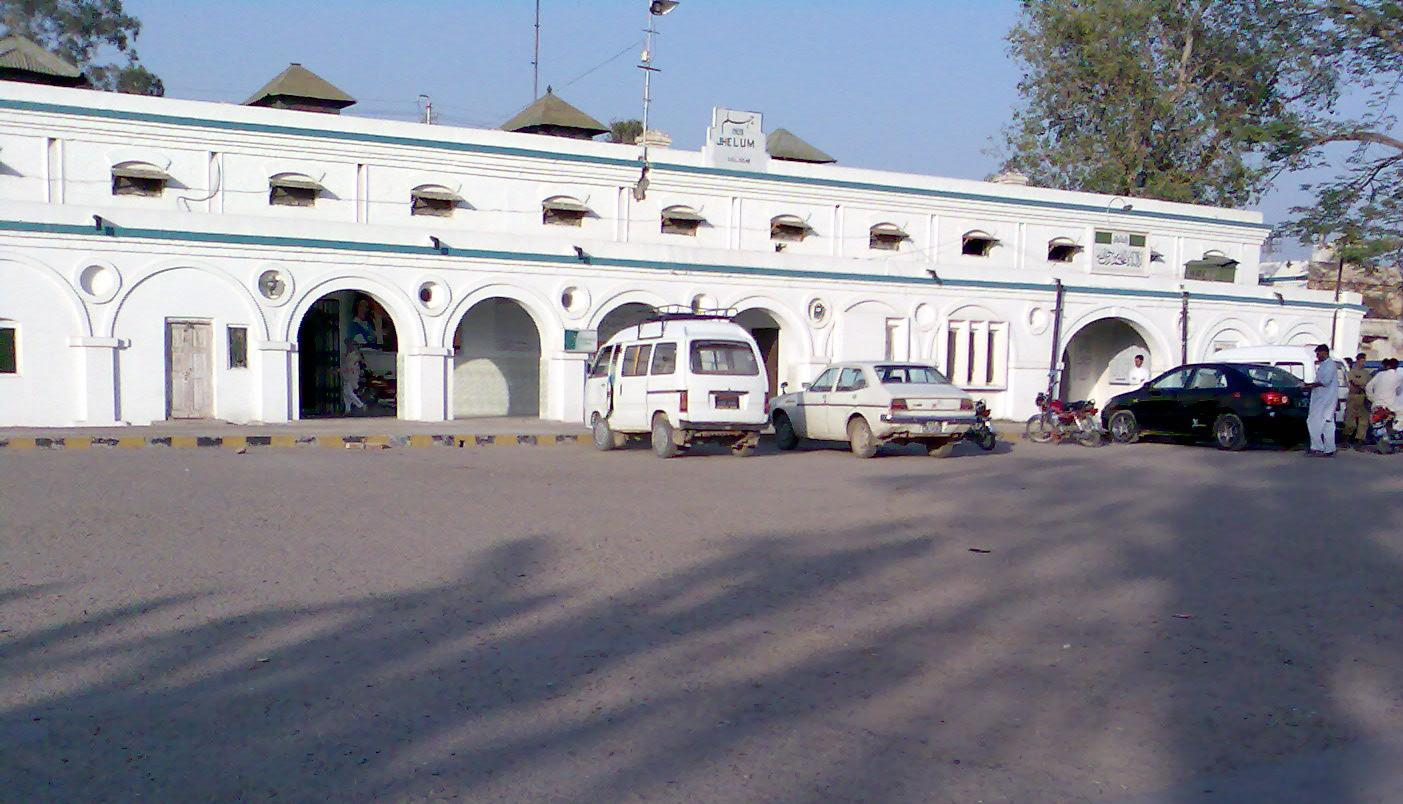
Jhelum Railway Station

Auto rickshaws are a common mode of transport for short routes within the city. Many of the new rickshaws in the city use compressed natural gas (CNG) instead of the petrol engines, as CNG is environmentally cleaner and cheaper than petrol. Manual rickshaws are another important mode of transportation. Older horse drawn tongas are now defunct, although some can still be privately commissioned. Taxis and privately commissioned small passenger carrying vans are available. Daewoo Express Bus Service and other bus services operate from the city to the entire country.

The Jhelum Railway Station was built in 1928 during British rule before the independence of Pakistan. It was connected by the North-Western Railway to other cities in the Raj. Jhelum is on the main line of Pakistan Railways, and linked to whole country through railway lines across Pakistan. The nearest international airport is the Islamabad International Airport, which is approximately 110 km by road from Jhelum. The Sialkot International Airport is approximately 100 km by road from Jhelum. A small airport called Gurha Salim Airport is situated 13 km (8 mi) from the city centre. It is not being used by any commercial airlines, but only for military purposes.

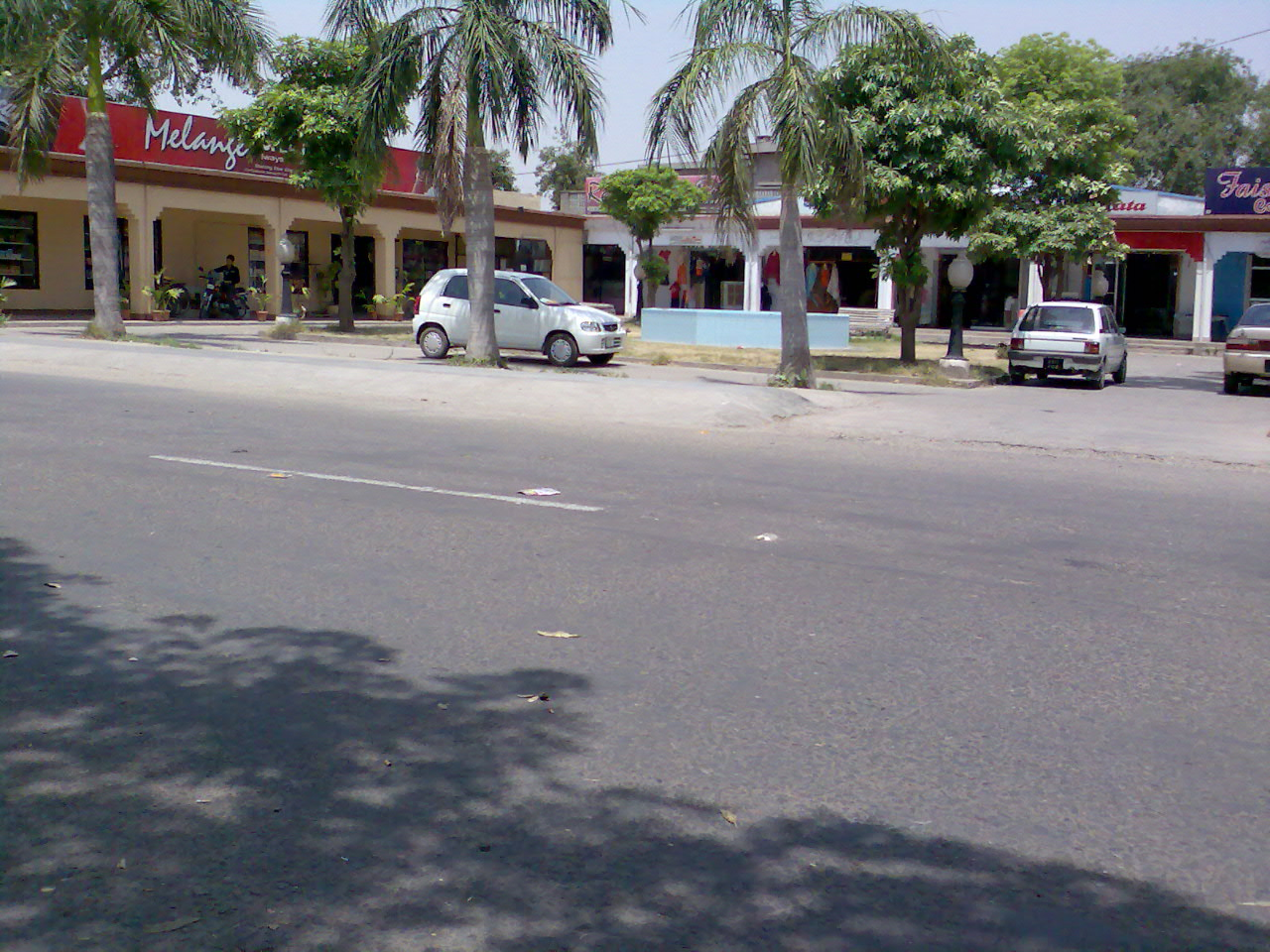
Melange supermarket

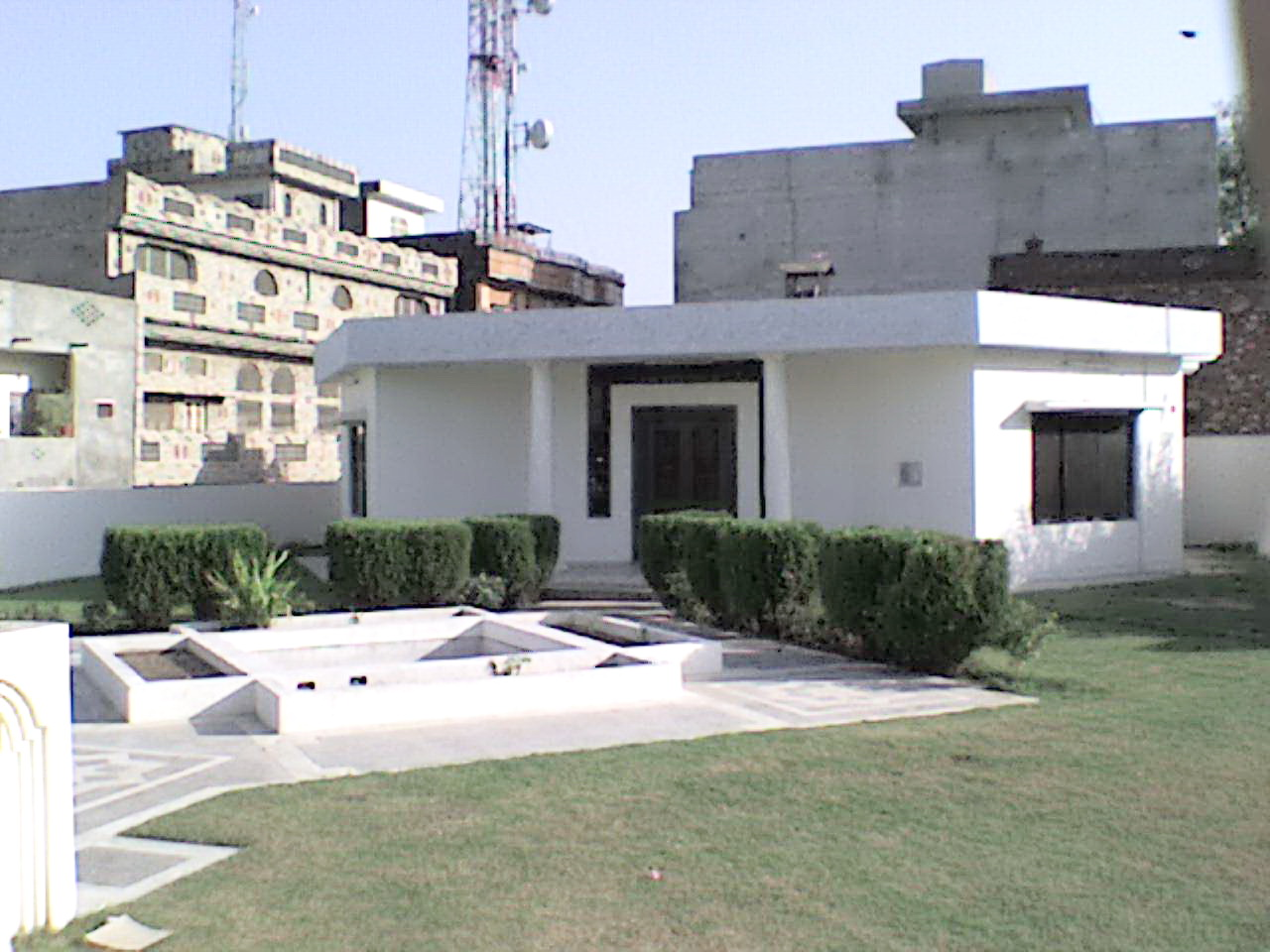
Akram Shaheed Library

Rohtas Fort is a garrison fort built by the Afghan king Sher Shah Suri. This fort is about 4 km in circumference and is situated in a gorge approximately 18 km NW of Jhelum and 7 km from Dina.

The old city has a labyrinth of narrow streets and bazaars. Opposite the CMH Jhelum Cantt is the CMH Masjid Jhelum mosque.

Located in the cantonment area is St. John's Church, Jhelum which was built in 1860. There was a local stadium near Gul Afshan Colony, which was changed to a cricket stadium named Zamir Jaffri Cricket Stadium. Altaf Park, which was constructed in 1994–95, is in very close proximity to the cricket stadium. Nearly 100 m from Shandar Chowk, in the center of city, is Major Akram Shaheed Memorial Park. Major Muhammad Akram Memorial Library is located in this park. This is also the site of a parade which takes place every year on 6 September on the occasion of Defence Day.

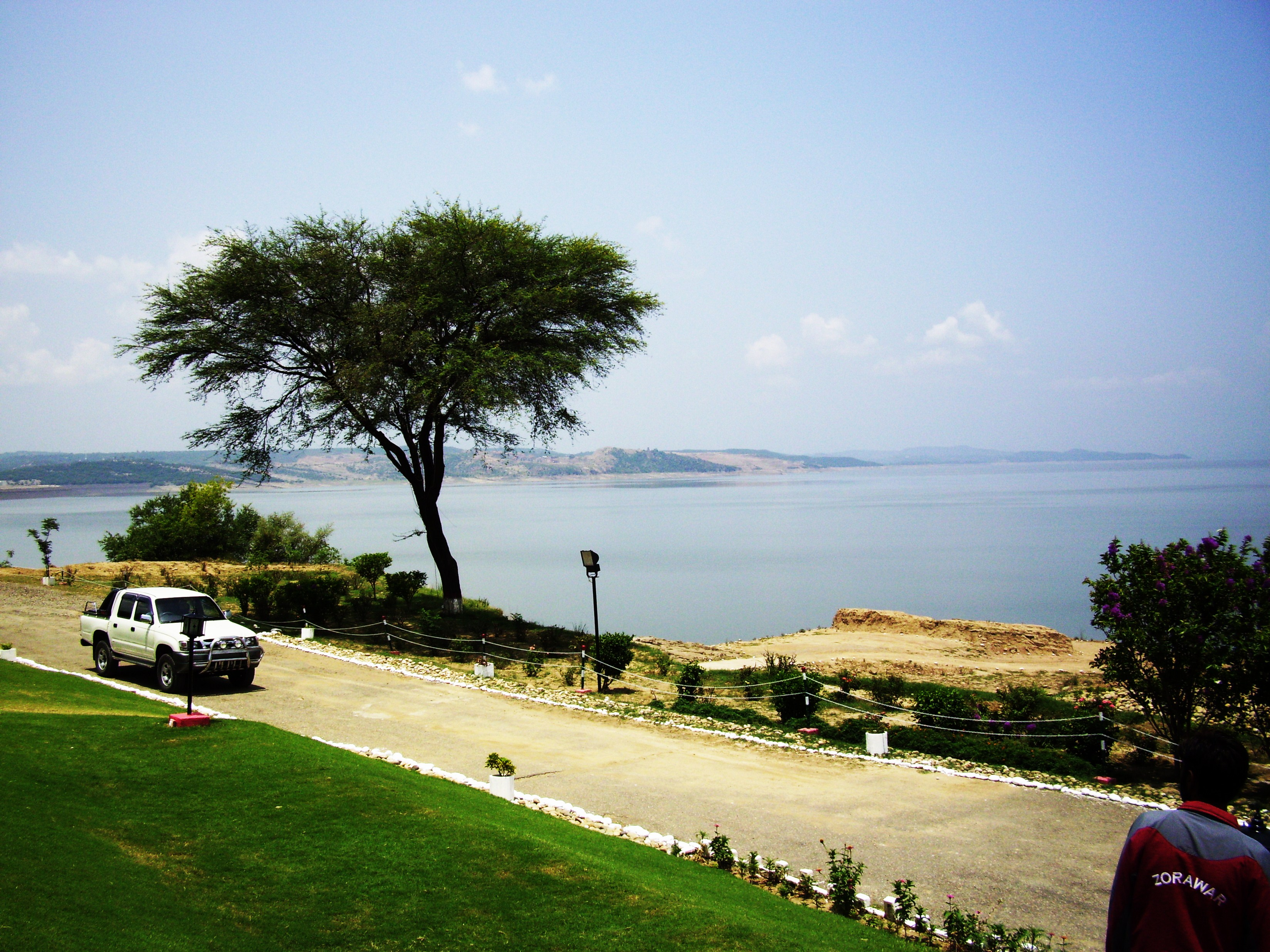
Mangla Dam Water Reservoir

Lehri Nature Park is located 10 kilometers away from G. T. Road between Jhelum and Islamabad. It is 30 kilometers from Jhelum and 90 kilometers from Islamabad, in the hilly Pothohar region.

The Mangla Dam is located on the Jhelum River about 30 km (19 mi) from Jhelum, and is the sixth largest dam in the world. It was constructed in 1967 across the Jhelum River.

Rasul Barrage is located on the Jhelum River about 30 km downstream from Jhelum. Two major water canals originate at the Rasul barrage: the Rasul-Qadirabad link canal, which is also called the Lower-Jhelum link canal, and the Rasul-Shahpur branch canal. The area around the Rasul barrage lake is also a picnic spot.

== Sports ==
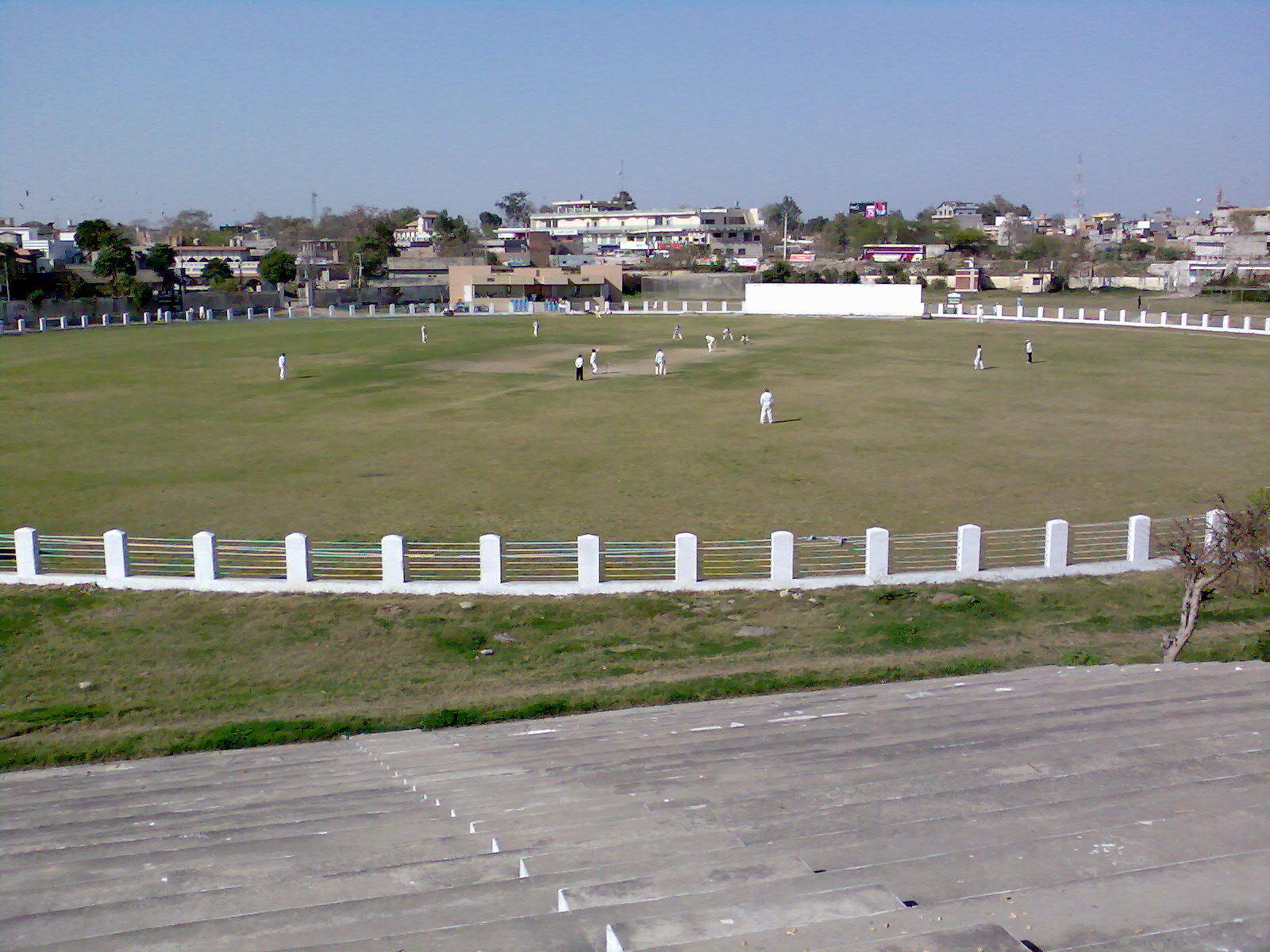
Cricket Stadium Jhelum

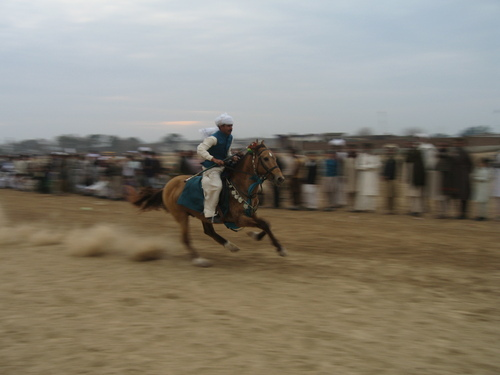
Horse and rider in action

Located within the city is a golf course called the River-View Golf Club, where national golf tournaments are held regularly.

There is a cricket and football stadium, Zamir Jaffri Cricket Stadium, where district level tournaments are held. In October 2008, Pakistan Cricket Board upgraded this stadium for regional events.

== Education ==
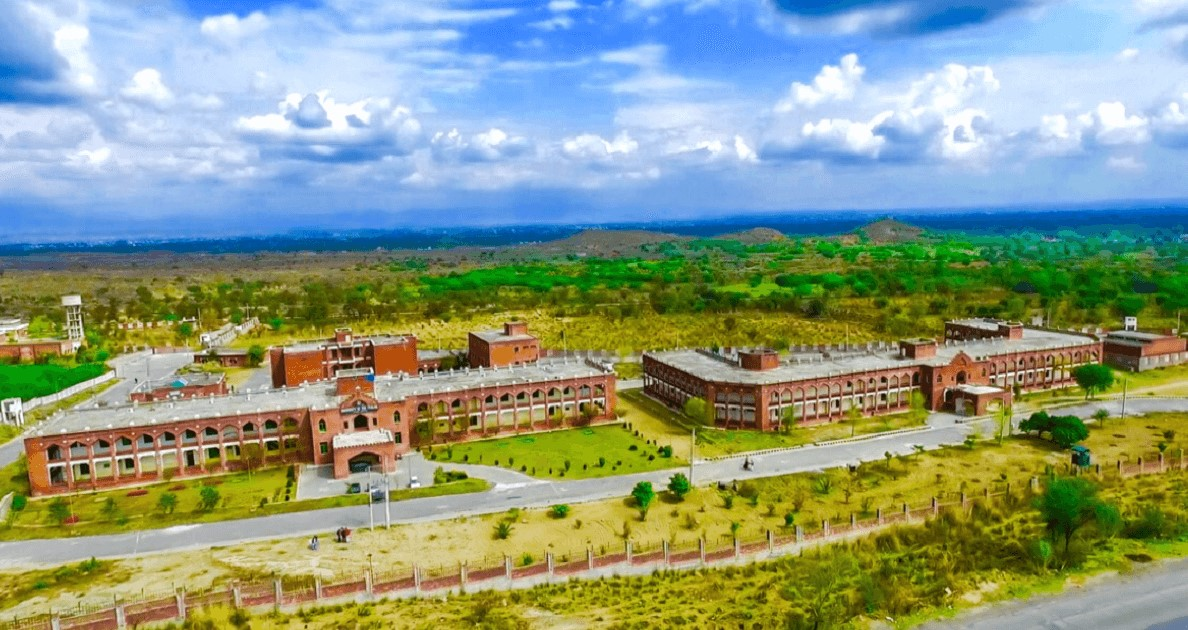
University of the Punjab, Jhelum Campus

Jhelum has six degree colleges for women, 10 degree colleges for men, six co-education colleges, six commerce colleges, one law college, numerous higher secondary schools, and over 150 high schools. It also has a campus of Punjab University, Punjab University Jhelum Campus, near Rathiyan, Kala Gujran, and Satellite Town Jhelum.

Jhelum is also home to the prestigious Military College Jhelum. The University of the Punjab has established a campus in Jhelum offering programs related to business, commerce, law, and computer science. The literacy rate of Jhelum is high in comparison to other cities of the Punjab. Sixty-five kanals of land was allocated to establish this campus by Government of Punjab. Jhelum also has two sub-campuses of the Virtual University of Pakistan, Virtual University Campus at Civil Lines opposite City Church, and a private virtual campus, Wings Institute of Learning. Virtual University of Pakistan inaugurated its own campus in Jhelum in March 2012, which is located in the middle of the city.

== Notable people ==
- Inder Kumar Gujral, thirteenth Prime Minister of India
- Rabia Qari, the first female Muslim barrister in South Asia

== See also ==
- Rawalpindi Division
- Potohar plateau
- Military College Jhelum
- List of colleges in Jhelum
