= Victoria Bridge, Jhelum =

Bridge on the Jhelum River, Pakistan

Victoria Bridge وکٹوریہ پل
- Coordinates: 32°55′09″N 73°44′11″E
- Carries: Pakistan Railways single-track line
- Crosses: Jhelum River
- Locale: Jhelum – Sarai Alamgir, Punjab, Pakistan
- Begins: Jhelum (west bank)
- Ends: Sarai Alamgir (east bank)
- Other name: Jhelum Bridge
- Named for: Queen Victoria
- Owner: Pakistan Railways
- Maintained by: Pakistan Railways

Characteristics
- Design: Iron truss
- Material: Iron
- Trough construction: Concrete (piers)
- Total length: 1,600 m (5,200 ft)
- Traversable?: yes
- No. of spans: 50
- No. of lanes: 1

Rail characteristics
- No. of tracks: 1
- Electrified: no

History
- Designer: William St. John Galwey
- Constructed by: Punjab Northern State Railway
- Construction start: 1873
- Construction end: 1878
- Opened: 1878

Location
- Interactive map of Victoria Bridge

The Victoria Bridge is a railway bridge situated between Jhelum and Sarai Alamgir on Jhelum River in Punjab, Pakistan.

== History ==
The bridge was built in 1878 by Irish engineer William St. John Galwey. It is composed of iron trusses over many concrete piers. It is a railway and road bridge, with a single railway track and a road on one side of the track.
