= Winifred Heston =

- Born: April 27, 1872; Ionia, Michigan, United States
- Died: June 1, 1922 (aged 50); East Jordan, Michigan, U.S.
- Education: Laura Memorial Women's Medical College (M.D., 1901), Alma College, Michigan (1896)

Winifred Heston, M.D., (April 27, 1872 – June 1, 1922) was an American Presbyterian medical missionary who worked in India with the Foreign Missionary Society of the Presbyterian Church in the U.S. Heston attended medical school at Laura Memorial Women’s Medical College of Cincinnati and was an associate physician at the General Hospital in Miraj, India, from 1903 to 1907. She performed over five hundred surgical operations during her service in Miraj.

== Personal life ==
Heston was born in Ionia, Michigan on April 27, 1872, to Alonzo Heston and Mary Elizabeth Heston (née Brown). Heston had one half-sister, Jessie B. Coulter (née Clark), a daughter of her mother’s from a previous marriage to Henry N. Clark. Heston spent her early life in Charlotte, Michigan, with her mother and half-sister.

Heston served as an associate physician at the General Hospital in Miraj, India, from 1903 to 1907. During Heston's first period of missionary work in India, her sister, Jessie B. Coulter (née Clark), died following a long illness. This was very difficult for Heston since she was so far away from her sister, who was still living in Michigan when it happened. The loss made Heston reluctant to return to the United States, since she knew her sister would no longer be there when she arrived in Michigan.

Heston returned to the United States in 1908. She sailed from India on March 15, 1908 and arrived in New York on May 22, 1908. During her voyage home from India, Heston became romantically involved with a British officer who had also been working in the Maharashtra State in India during the time Heston was there. He was aboard the same ship Heston took when she left India in 1908, both of them traveling through Italy on their trip back to their respective home countries.

Heston and other passengers on the ship, including other missionaries and Italian military officers, visited Naples, Italy, after their ship arrived in Europe. During this time, Heston wrote in letters to friends at home that she had become close to the officer, who was a major in the British army. Heston had encountered the officer before, during her time in India, when he brought her back to the Presbyterian mission after she had fallen off her horse.

After they parted ways in Italy, Heston received a letter from the officer, claiming that he would come to visit her if she gave him any encouragement. Heston indicated in a letter that she planned to invite him to visit her in the United States.

In a letter to her friend in 1908, Heston suggested that she planned to marry the officer. She feared that this would prevent her from returning to India to do missionary work. Ultimately, Heston never married, and returned to India for a second mission in 1910.

After returning home, Heston compiled a collection of her personal letters into the novel A Bluestocking in India: Her Medical Wards and Messages Home, which was published by the Fleming H. Revell Company in 1910.

In 1909, Heston took a government position as an eye doctor, serving the Native American population in Arizona. Suffering from poor health after her time in India, she only spent one year working there. After leaving Arizona, she spent a brief period of time living in California but had to return home due to her illness.

She returned home to Michigan for a short time, then sailed to Bombay again on December 17, 1910. From 1910 to 1915, Heston worked at a hospital for women and children in Jhelum, India under the United Presbyterian Board. In 1915, Heston sailed back to the United States via China and Japan.

Heston died on June 1, 1922, in East Jordan, Michigan, of an accidental morphine overdose. She was 50 years old.

== Education ==
Heston graduated from Alma College, a Presbyterian university in Michigan, in 1896, and from the Laura Memorial Woman's Medical College of Cincinnati, in 1901, with the degrees of M.D. and M.A. She worked for one year as an intern at the Presbyterian Hospital in Cincinnati before accepting service with the Foreign Mission Society of the Presbyterian Church.

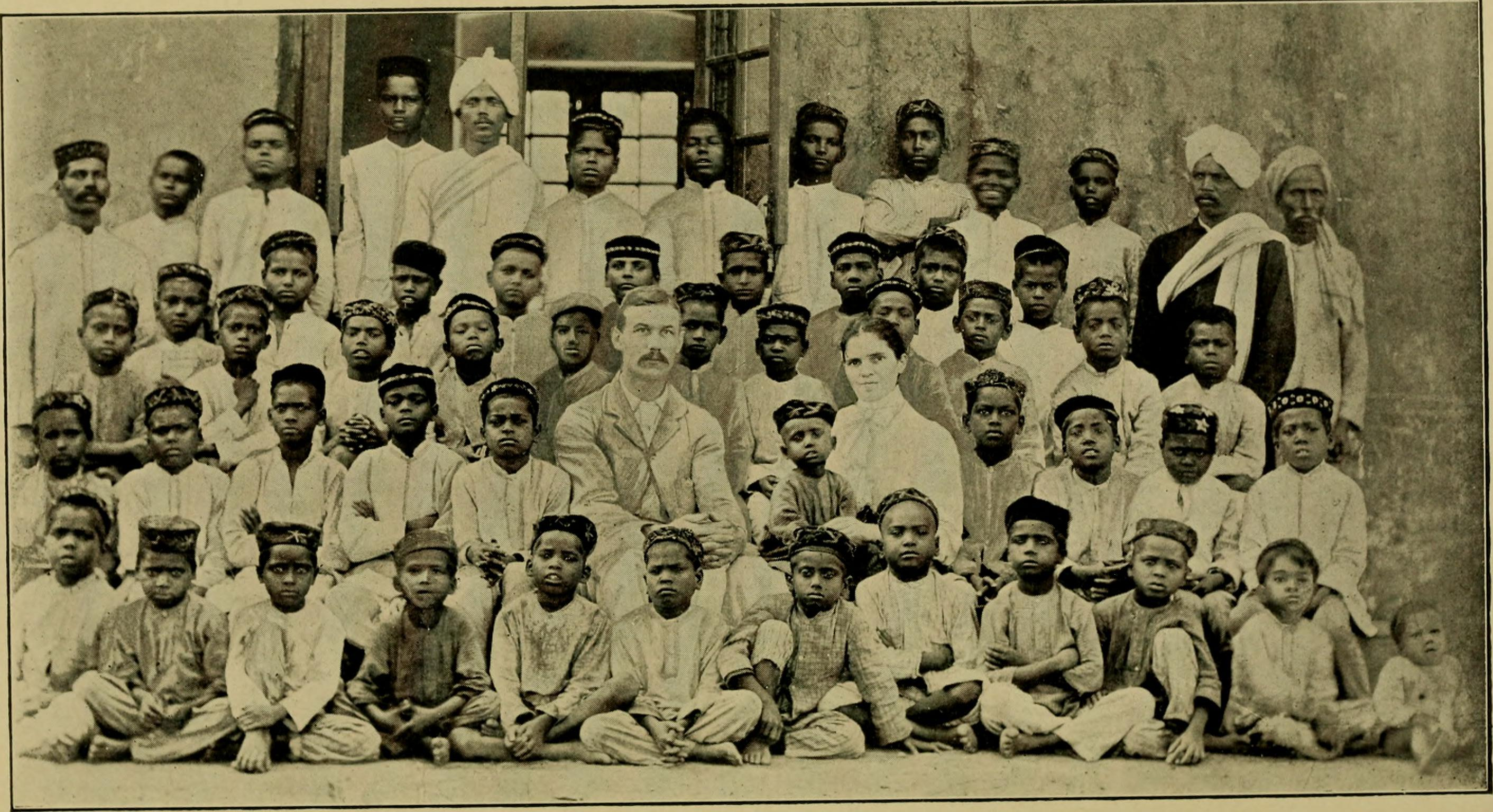
Dr. Heston with famine orphans and other missionaries in Western India

== Journey ==
Heston sailed to Bombay, India, from New York, New York, leaving the United States on October 14, 1902. She was accompanied on her voyage by two other Christian missionaries, who left their ten-year-old daughter behind in America when they left for India. Heston described their parting as tearful, and was very sad to leave New York herself. She arrived in Bombay on November 20, 1902, and began preparing for missionary work.

== Missionary Work ==
Heston went on her first medical mission to India in 1902, and remained in India until she returned to the United States in 1908. After a period of time working in the United States, she went back to India for another mission in 1910, and remained for five years before returning to the United States in 1915.

=== First Mission ===
After arriving in Bombay, Heston began to learn the local Marathi language, which the Presbyterian board required missionaries in Western India to study during the first year of their service in India. Heston, however, took the Marathi proficiency exam after only six months of study and began working actively in the community before the end of her first year in India.

After finishing her studies, Heston became an associate physician at the General Hospital in Miraj, India, in the Maharashtra State, which is known today as the Mary Wanless Hospital/Miraj Medical Center. In 1903, the hospital was under the direction of William J. Wanless, M.D., a missionary who, like Heston, had traveled to India with the Presbyterian board.

Heston served as an associate physician in Miraj from the beginning of her missionary work in 1903 until she returned to the United States in 1908. During her time in Miraj, Heston performed over five hundred surgical operations.

=== Return home ===
Heston returned to the United States for two years between her periods of missionary service. She sailed from Bombay on March 15, 1908, and arrived in New York on May 22, 1908. She sailed to New York via Italy, stopping to visit Venice and Naples with other missionaries and military officers aboard her ship.

Heston had felt ill and tired throughout much of her later years in India, which she felt may have been linked to her grief after the death of her half-sister in 1904 and the loss of another missionary working at the General Hospital in Miraj. Upon her return to New York, she was advised by a nerve specialist to take a "rest cure" and remain on bed rest for at least four weeks.

In 1908 and 1909, Heston lived with her mother in Michigan and compiled letters she had sent while abroad to create her novel A Bluestocking in India: Her Medical Wards and Messages Home, which was published by the Fleming H. Revell Company in 1910.

In October 1909, Heston took a government position in Arizona as an eye specialist. She served the Native American community there until leaving for California in 1910. Due to her poor health, Heston only spent a brief period in California before returning home to Michigan.

=== Second mission ===
In 1910, Heston returned to India to continue her missionary work. Before leaving India after her first period of missionary work in 1908, she had been informed that the Presbyterian board planned to open a hospital for women and children in Jhelum, India, which should be ready for work in less than two years.

In 1910, Heston took charge of that hospital and worked there until 1915, completing more surgical operations than she had during her previous service.

== Legacy ==
Dr. Heston is known for her significant surgical service as a female surgeon in India, her leadership as founding director of the mission hospital in Jhelum Cantonment, and her book A Bluestocking in India: Her Medical Wards and Messages Home,.

== Death ==
In 1915, Heston returned to Michigan, sailing from India via Japan and California. She lived in East Jordan, Charlevoix, Michigan, until her death in 1922.

Heston died on June 1, 1922, in East Jordan, Michigan, of an accidental morphine overdose. The overdose may have been connected to Heston's long illness. She was advised to take a "rest cure" after returning from her first mission to India in 1908, due to poor health during her time abroad, and was troubled by her illness during her time in United States, when she was unable to remain in Arizona or California for long periods of time due to her health issues. She was 50 years old at the time of her death.

== Publications ==
- Heston, Winifred (1910). A Bluestocking in India: Her Medical Wards and Messages Home. Fleming H. Revell Company.
