= Zamir Jaffri Cricket Stadium =

Cricket stadium in Jhelum, Pakistan

Coordinates: 32°55′27″N 73°43′41″E

- Jhelum Cricket Stadium
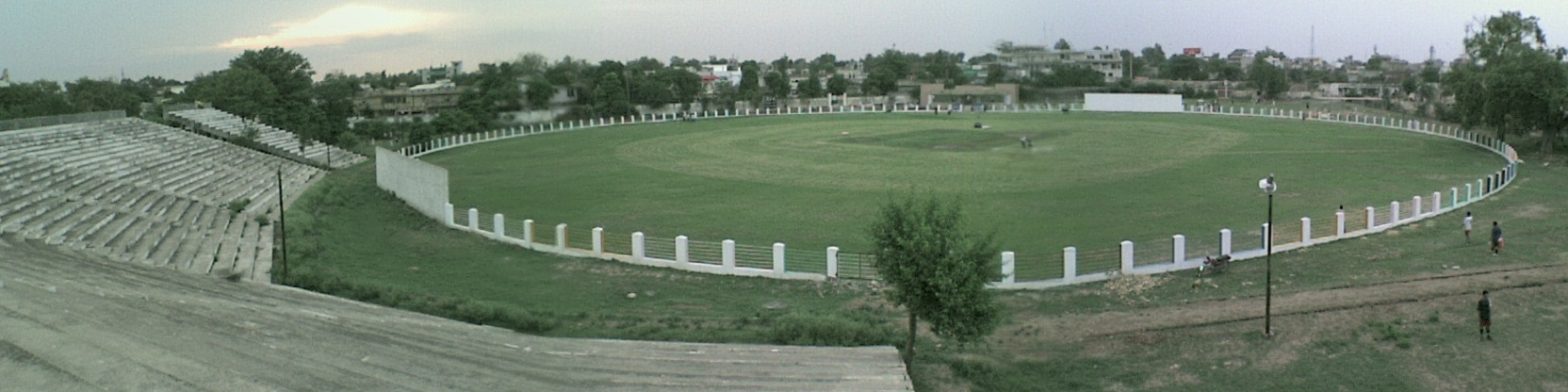
- Interactive map of Zamir Jaffri Cricket Stadium
- Location: Jhelum, Punjab, Pakistan
- Owner: Pakistan Cricket Board
- Operator: Sports Department of Jhelum/ Jhelum Cricket Association
- Capacity: 10,000
- Surface: Grass

Construction
- Opened: October 10, 2008

Tenants
- Jhelum Cricket Team, Pakistan

Zamir Jaffri Cricket Stadium is a cricket stadium in Jhelum, Pakistan. Owned by the Pakistan Cricket Board (PCB), the stadium is named after Jhelum's native poet Syed Zamir Jafri. The stadium is in close proximity to Altaf Park which was built in 1994–95.

It used to be a local district-level stadium, but now the PCB has upgraded it for regional-level events. Six additional cricket pitches have been prepared at the venue.

== Gallery ==
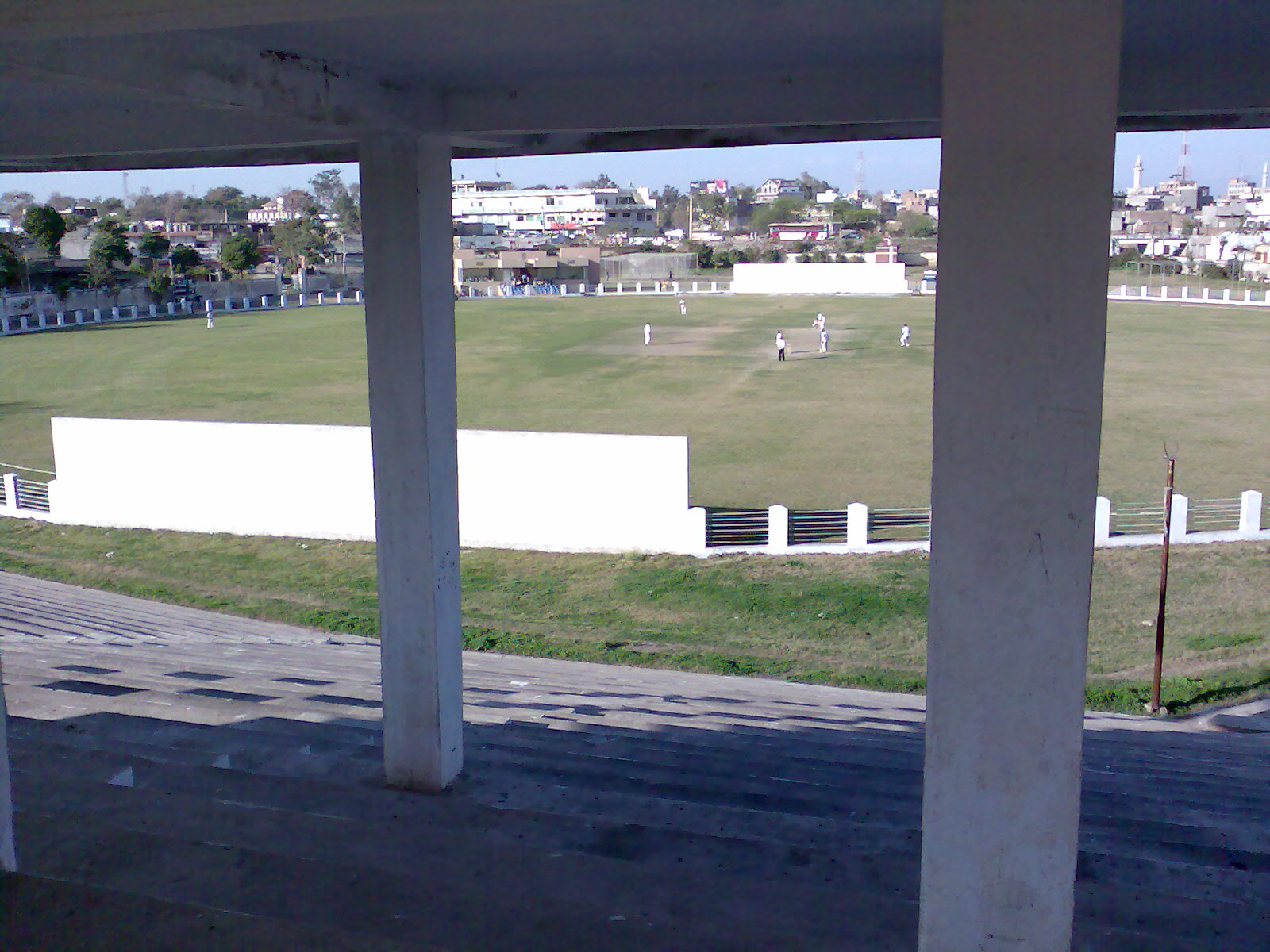
Zamir Jaffri Cricket Stadium

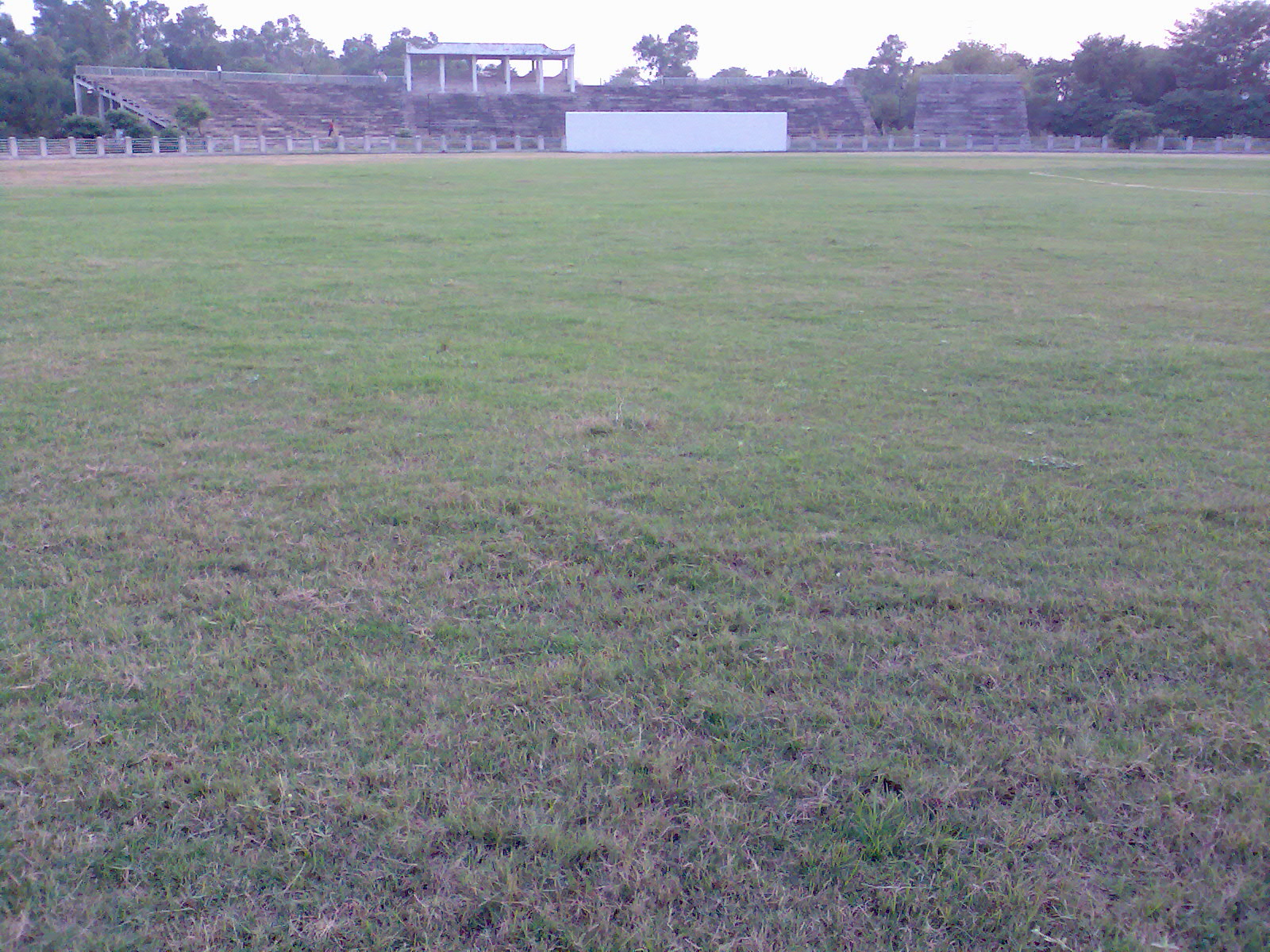
Ground

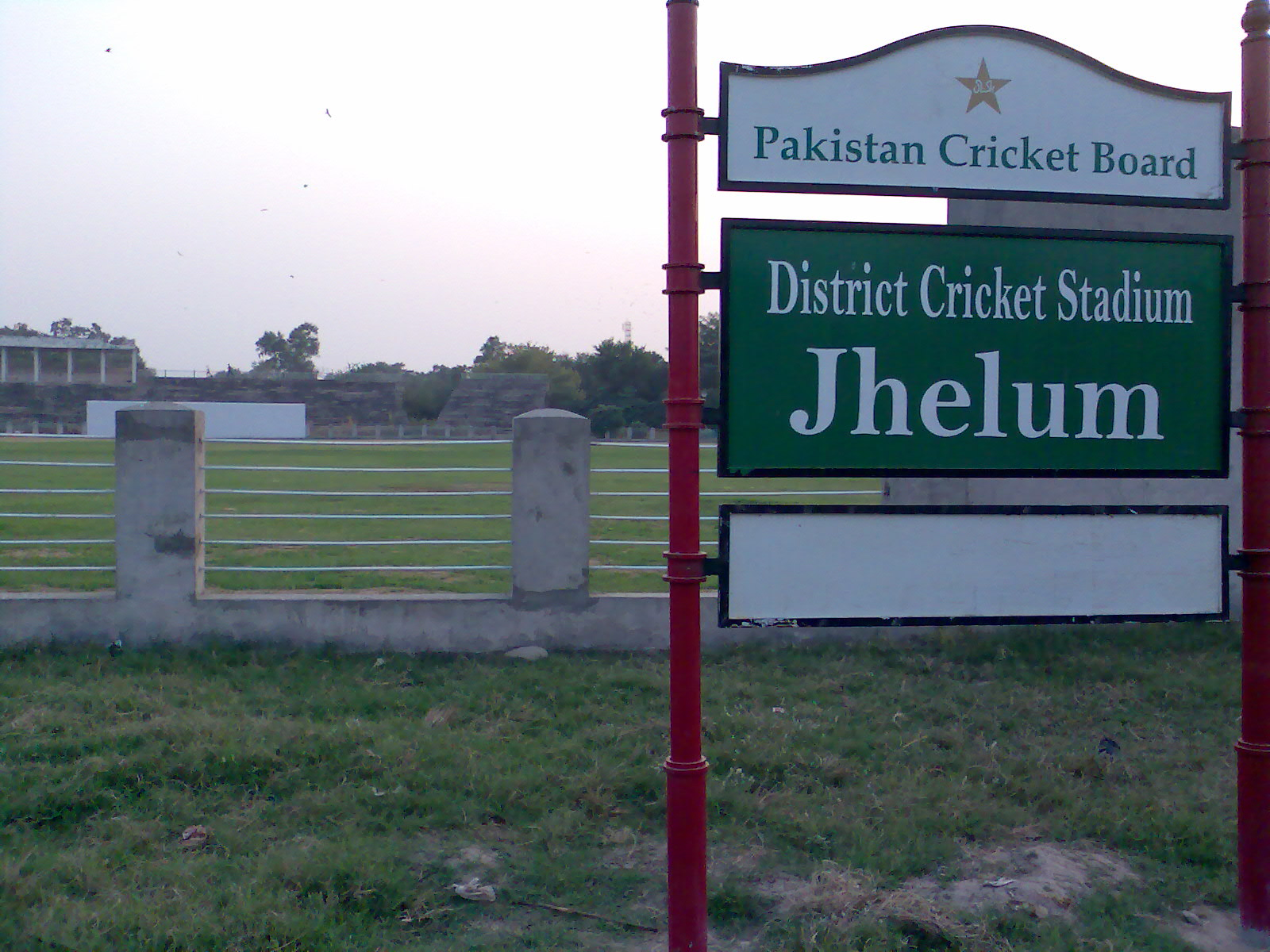
Stadium

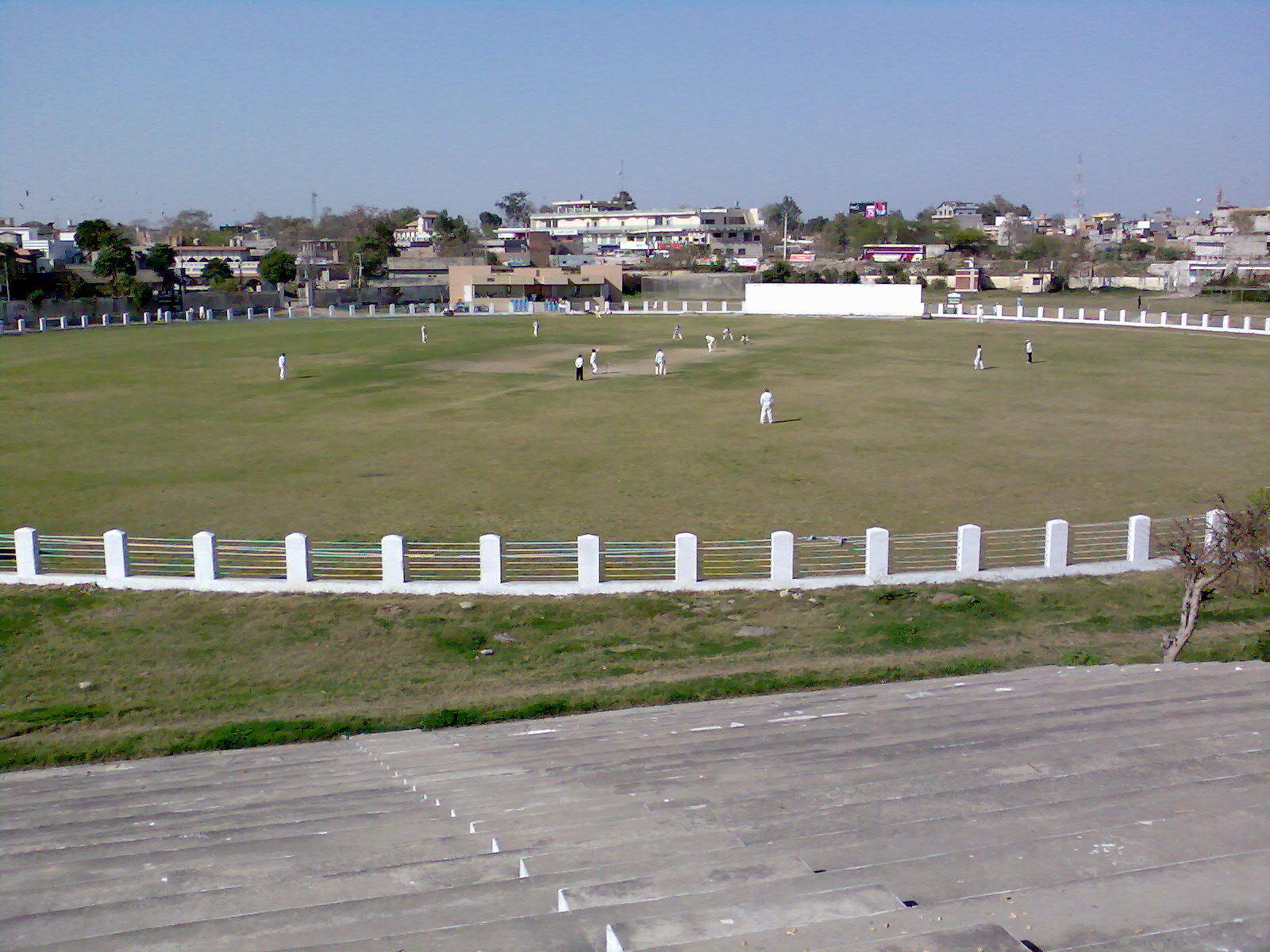
Zamir Jaffri Stadium

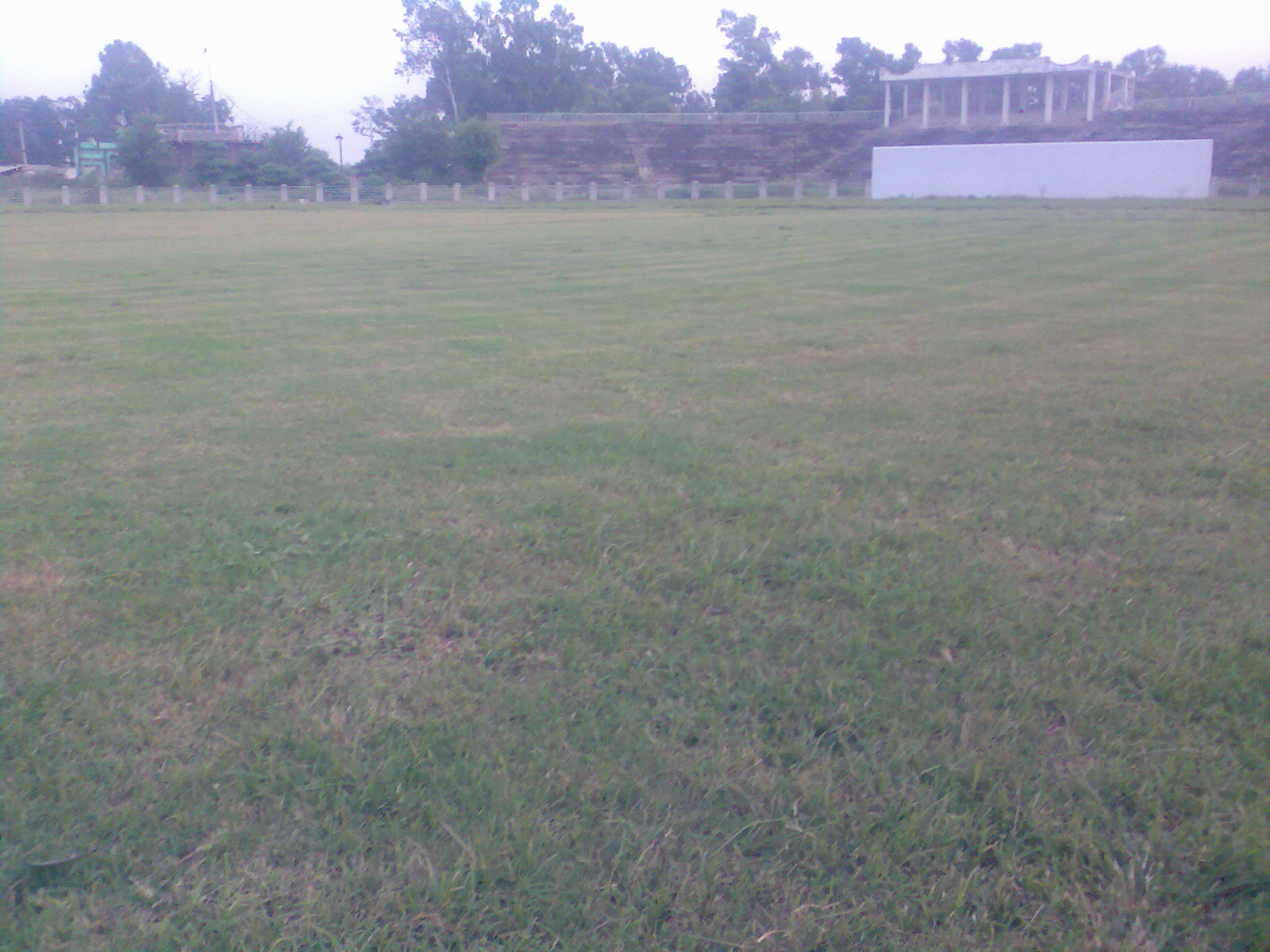
Stadium

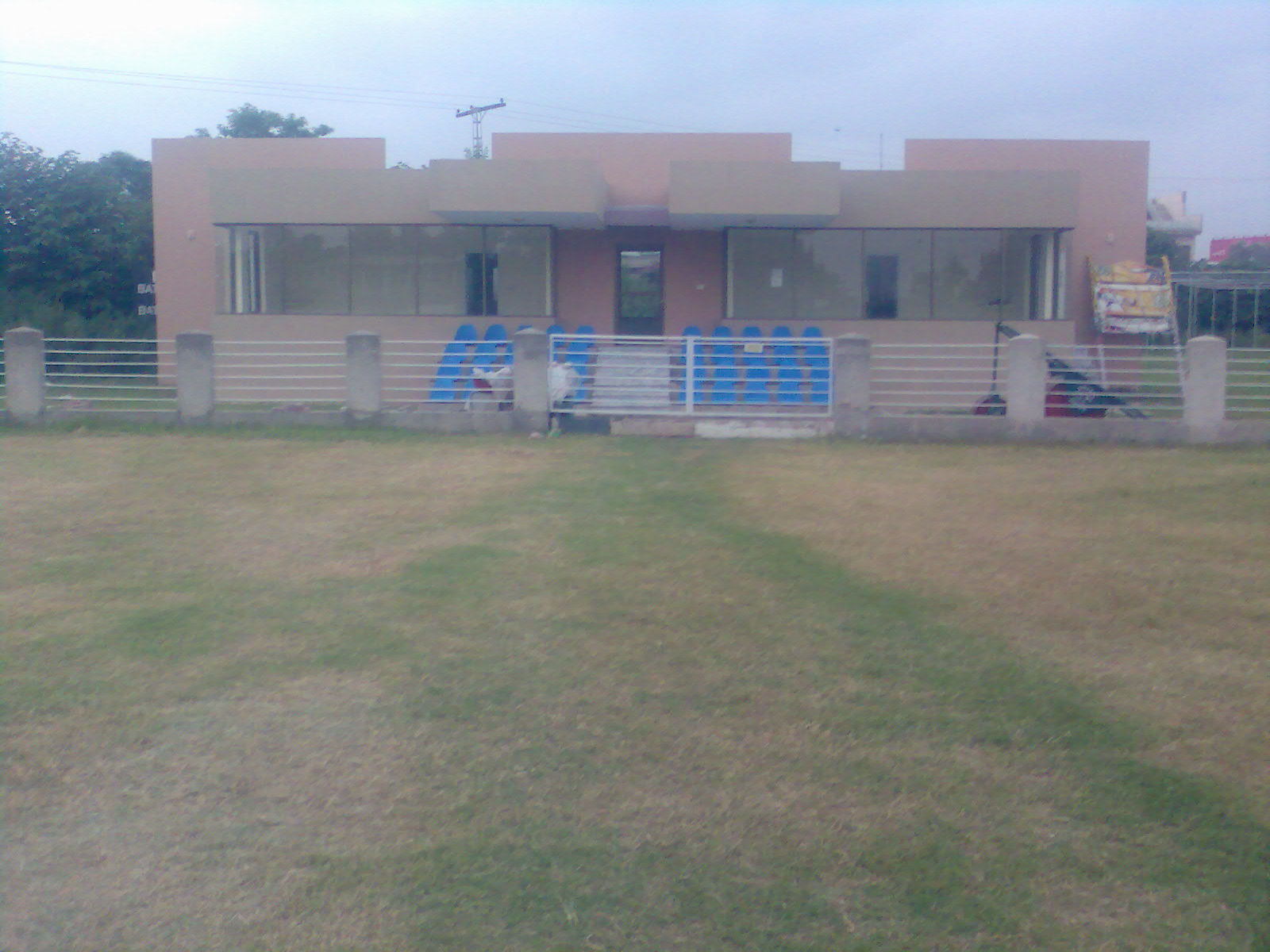
Stadium Pavilion

== See also ==
- Sport in Pakistan
- List of stadiums in Pakistan
