= William Spring (British Army officer) =

British Army officer (1769–1825)

- Born: 1769; County Kerry, Ireland
- Died: 14 August 1825 (aged 55–56) Tralee, County Kerry, Ireland
- Allegiance: United Kingdom
- Branch: British Army
- Service years: 1789–1819
- Rank: Lieutenant-Colonel
- Commands: 1st Battalion, 57th (West Middlesex) Regiment of Foot; 2nd Battalion, 57th (West Middlesex) Regiment of Foot
- Conflicts: French Revolutionary Wars; Napoleonic Wars
- Awards: Army Gold Medal

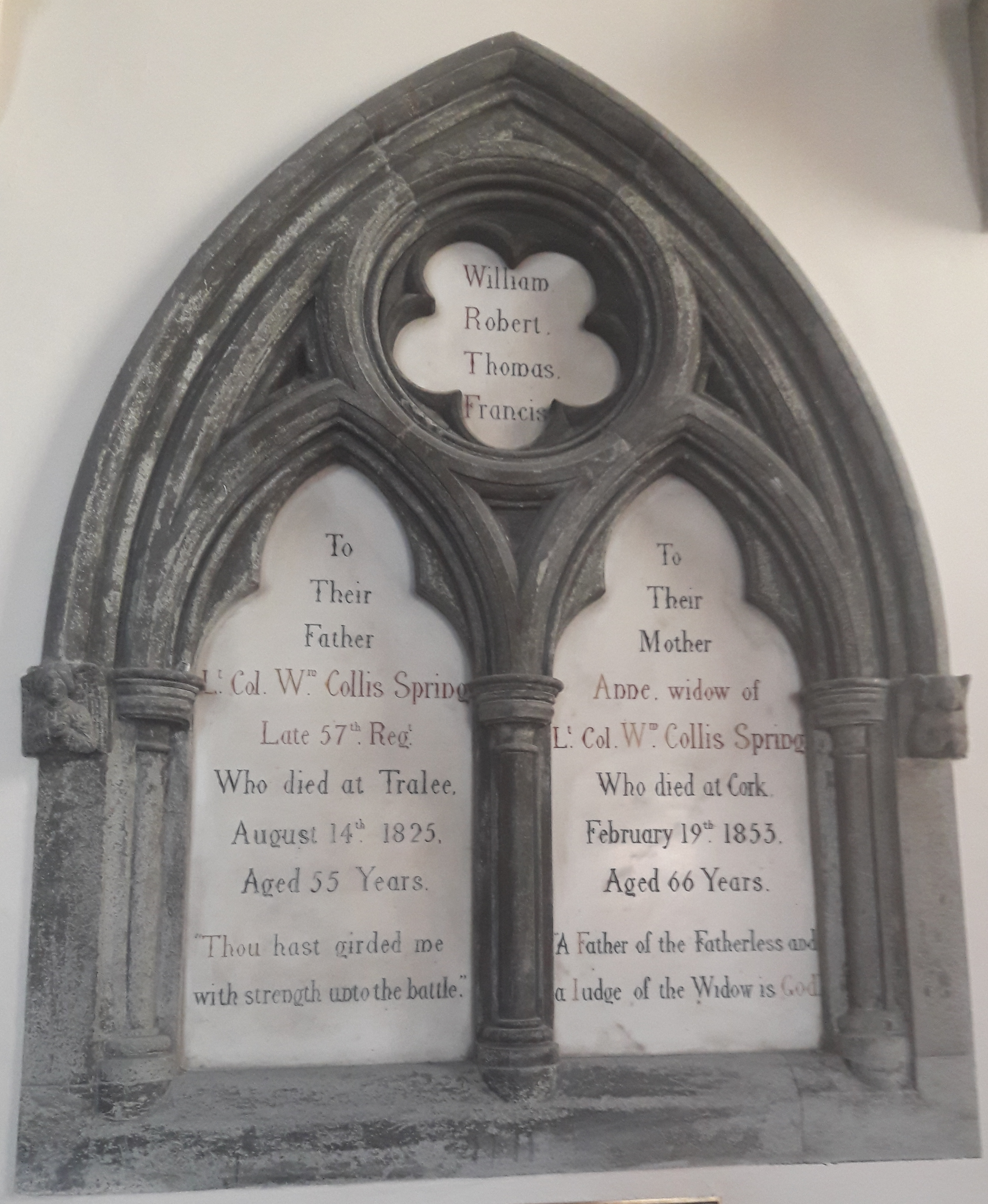
Memorial to William Collis Spring and his wife Anne in St John the Evangelist's Church, Tralee, County Kerry.

Lieutenant-Colonel William Collis Spring (1769 – 14 August 1825) was an Anglo-Irish British Army officer of the Napoleonic Wars.

== Early life ==
Spring was born into the Spring family in County Kerry, Ireland in 1769. He was the son of Captain John Spring and Mary Blennerhassett Collis, and the great-great-grandson of Robert Blennerhassett MP.

== Military career ==
He purchased an ensigncy in the 48th (Northamptonshire) Regiment of Foot in 1789, subsequently purchasing a lieutenancy in same regiment in 1793. He first saw service in the Caribbean against the French during the French Revolutionary Wars, and was part of the force under Charles Grey, 1st Earl Grey which captured several French island colonies. Between 6 May and 4 September 1795, he commanded a company in the 69th (South Lincolnshire) Regiment of Foot. He was then transferred to the 57th (West Middlesex) Regiment of Foot; the regiment with which he would remain for the rest of his career.

Spring saw further service in the West Indies with the 57th Foot, and was present at the Battle of Morne Fortune on 24 May 1796. After a period of inactive service in Trinidad he returned to England in 1803. In 1811, he joined the 1st Battalion of the regiment in the Peninsula Campaign. He fought with distinction and was injured at the Battle of Albuera on 16 May 1811, alongside his commanding officer, William Inglis. Following the engagement, in which the 57th suffered high casualties, Spring was awarded the Army Gold Medal. He commanded the 2nd battalion from 1811 to 1814. Spring was promoted to lieutenant-colonel on 4 June 1813, and took command of the 57th Foot's 1st Battalion in 1815. Following the victory of the Allied armies at the Battle of Waterloo, Spring's battalion was part of the 16th British Brigade of Wellington's army of occupation in France. Spring retired from the army in 1819 and was appointed Deputy Lieutenant of Kerry.

== Marriage and issue ==
He married Anne, the only daughter of Lt. John Chilton Lambton Carter. Spring's youngest son, Captain Francis Spring, was killed at Jhelum (modern day Pakistan) by rebels during the Indian Rebellion of 1857 whilst serving with the 24th Regiment of Foot.

== See also ==
- Veve, Thomas D. (1992). The Duke of Wellington and the British Army of Occupation in France, 1815-1818. Praeger. pp. 51–52. ISBN 9780313279416.
- Phillipart, John (1820). The Royal Military Calendar, Or Army Service and Commission Book, Volume 4. Great Britain: A.J. Valpy, sold by T. Egerton. p. 337 (entry 995). ISBN 9780313279416.
