= R & R Dickson =

Scottish architects

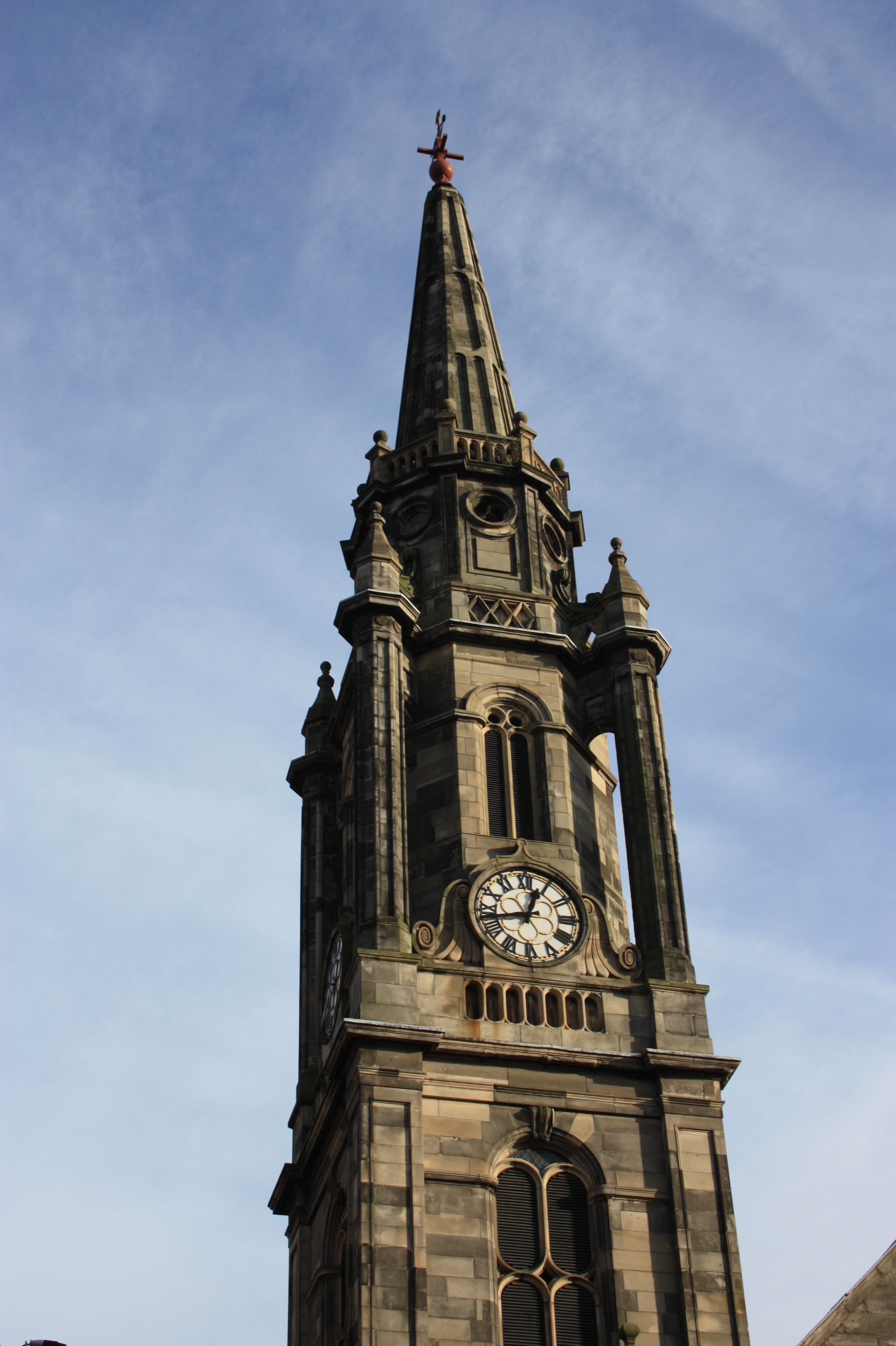
The magnificent stone spire of Tron Kirk on the Royal Mile in Edinburgh by R & R Dickson

Richard and Robert Dickson (usually simply referred to as R & R Dickson) were brothers, acting as architects in Scotland in the early and mid-19th century. Whilst most of their work is typified by remote country houses they are best known for their spire on the Tron Kirk in the heart of Edinburgh on the Royal Mile.

== Life ==
They were the sons of John Dickson (1766–1828), an Edinburgh builder. Their mother was Mary Crichton, sister to Richard Crichton (1771–1817), an Edinburgh architect, and they appear to have trained under him, taking over his office upon his death.

Their offices were at 9 Blenheim Place near the top of Leith Walk a handsome and unusual building forming part of a terrace designed by Playfair and built by their own father in 1824. It is possible that the unit was in lieu of payment for this stylish row, characterised by its being the only flat roofed Georgian terraced "bungalows" (with basement for servants) in Edinburgh.

They designed in a variety of styles from Gothic to Classical. There buildings are both sound and attractive and most are now listed buildings.

Richard (1792–1857) was the older of the two. He is buried in Old Calton Cemetery with his parents.

== Works ==
See

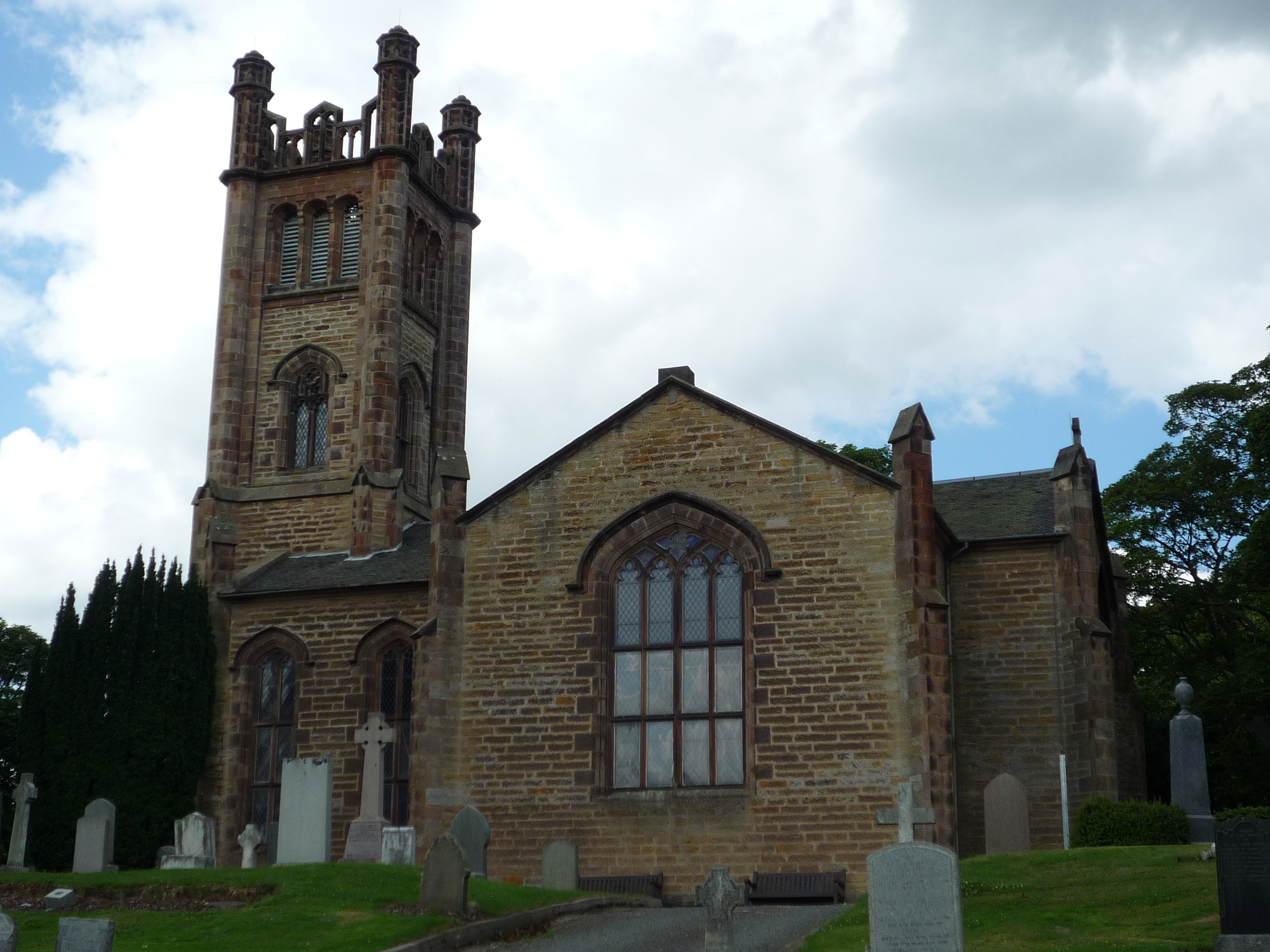
Cockpen Parish Church, 1817

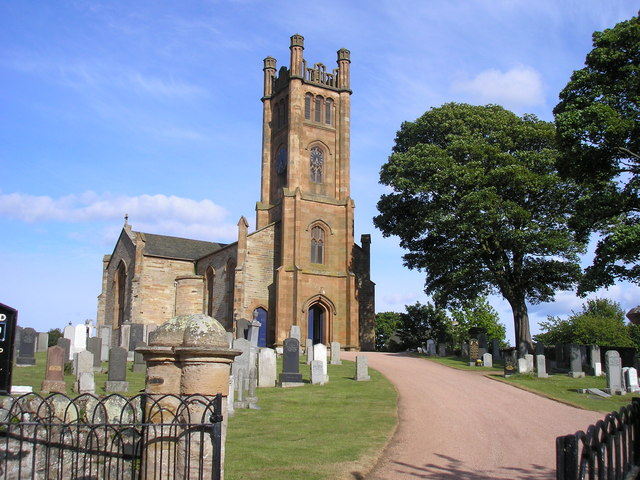
Kilconquhar Parish Church, 1819

the original Bathgate Academy, 1833

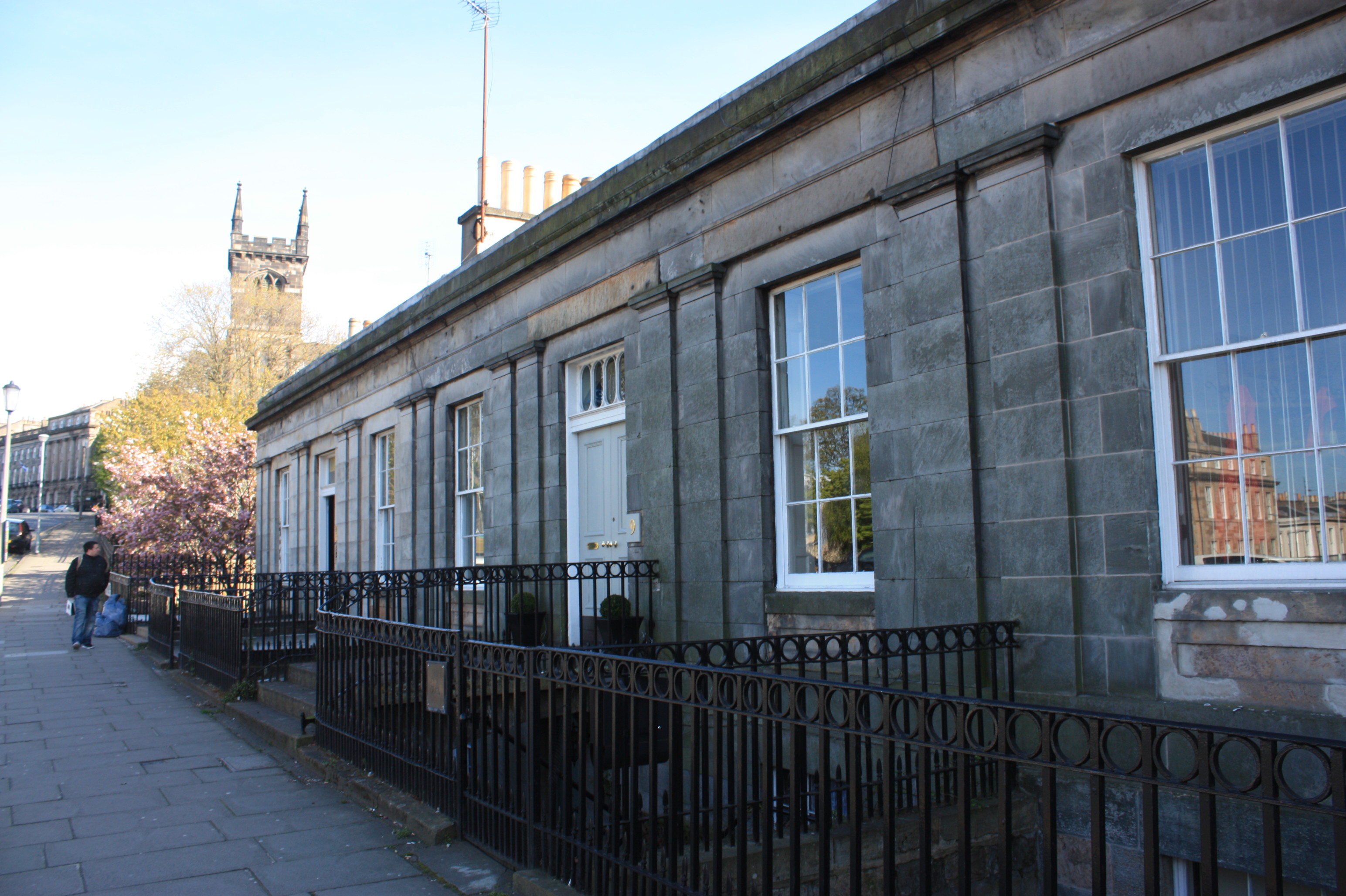
R & R Dickson's office at Blenheim Place, Edinburgh

- Abercairney House, Crieff (1817) completing Richard Crichton's job on his death
- Cockpen Parish Church (1817) again completing Richard Crichton's design on his death
- Kilconquhar Parish Church (1819) a slightly enlarged version of the Cockpen design
- Redesign of Cortachy Castle (1820) adding crenellations as were the fashion of the day, plus rebuilding of the nearby Cortachy Parish Church (aka Clocharty) within the. castle estate
- Coul House, Contin (1820)
- Whitehaugh, Newcastleton (1822)
- West Lodge Balbirnie House (1824) note- they probably worked on the main house during their apprenticeship under Richard Crichton
- The large tenement at Gardners Crescent/ Morrison Street in Edinburgh (1826)
- Classical crescent, 1-25 Gardners Crescent (1826)
- Church at Gardners Crescent (1827) (demolished)
- Inchrye Lodge, Denmylne Castle near Newburgh, Fife (1827)
- Leith Town Hall (1827) now Leith Police Station
- The impressive spire on the Tron Kirk on the Royal Mile (1828) rebuilt in a Wren style following the Great Fire of Edinburgh of 1824 in which the original spire was destroyed
- Muirhouse in rural north-west Edinburgh (1830) now encompassed by the city
- Bathgate Academy (1831)
- Veterinary College, Clyde Street, Edinburgh (1833) closed 1916 to move to Summerhall. Building demolished to build a cinema c.1930 and then cleared for St Andrew Square Bus Station
- West lodge, Blair Drummond (1836) note- the brothers probably worked on the main house (designed by Richard Crichton) during their apprenticeship
- St James Episcopal Church, Muthill (1836)
- Collessie Parish Church (1838)
- Estate buildings, Arbuthnott House, Kincardineshire (1839)
- Dr Bell's School, Great Junction Street, Leith (1839)
- Dunimarle Castle (1839)
- Blair Cottages, Blair Atholl (1840)
- Collessie School and schoolmaster's house (1846)
- Kinellan House, Murrayfield, Edinburgh (1846) probably for the MacKenzies of Kinellan in Ross and Cromarty
- Duchess of Atholl's Girls School, Dunkeld (1853)
- Kincardine School, Kincardine-in-Menteith, Perthshire (1855)
- Atholl Arms Hotel, Blair Atholl (1856)
- Garryside Village, Blair Atholl (1856)
- Duke of Atholl's School, Logierait (1863)
- Possibly: Wooers' Alley, Dunfermline (c.1828)
