= Mary Louisa Bruce, Countess of Elgin =

British aristocrat & writer (1819-1898)

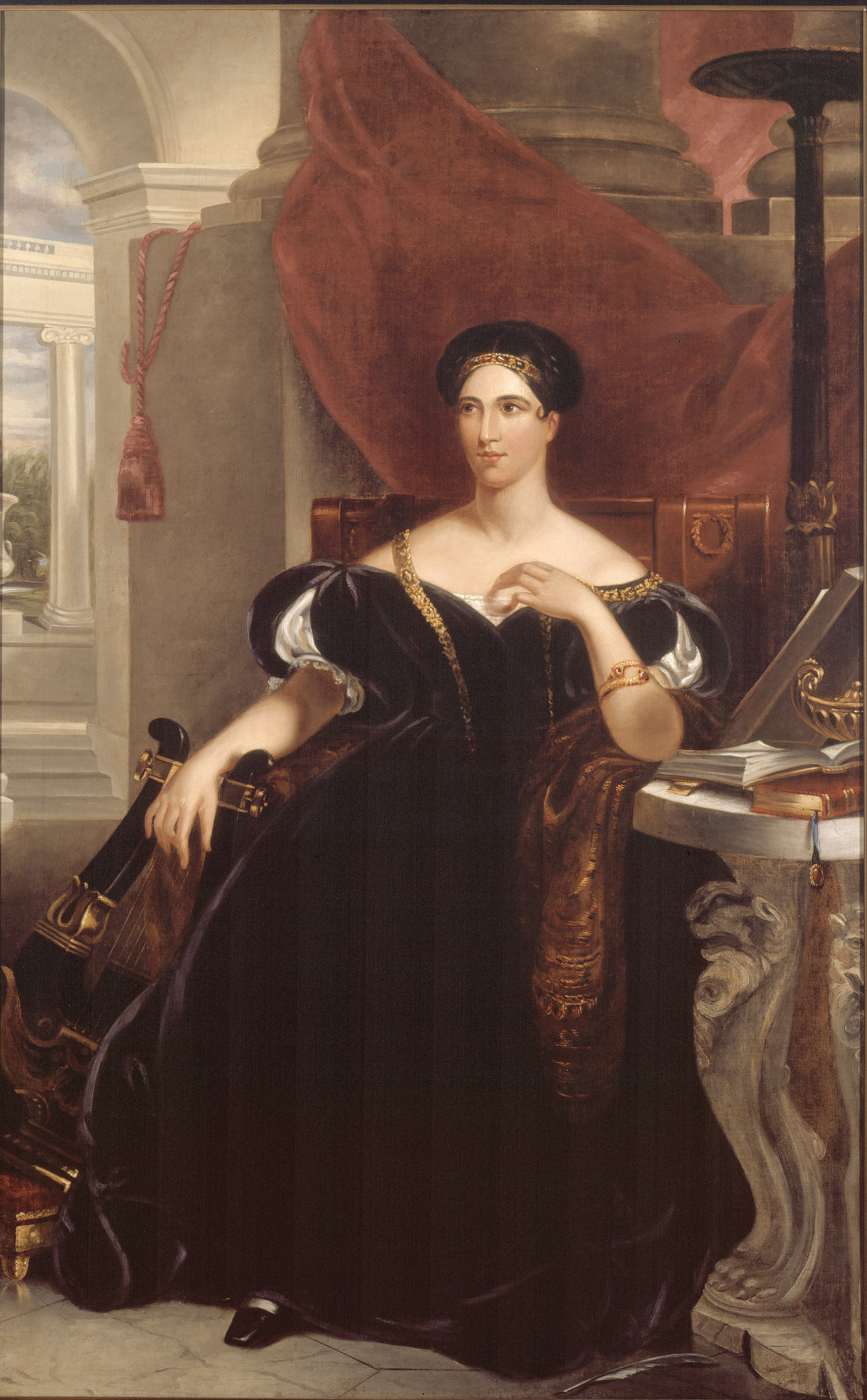
- Born: 1819
- Died: 9 March 1898 (aged 78–79)
- Occupation: Visual artist
- Spouse(s): James Bruce, 8th Earl of Elgin
- Children: 4, including Victor and Robert
- Parent(s): John Lambton, 1st Earl of Durham; Louisa Grey
- Relatives: George Lambton, 2nd Earl of Durham
- Awards: Order of the Crown of India

Mary Louisa Bruce, Countess of Elgin and Kincardine (née Lambton; 8 May 1819 – 9 March 1898) was a British aristocrat and writer. She was Vicereine of India in 1862-1863.

== Parents ==
She was the daughter of John Lambton, 1st Earl of Durham and his second wife Louisa Elizabeth Lambton (née Grey), daughter of Charles Grey, 2nd Earl Grey.

== Travels to Canada ==
She travelled to Canada twice: the first time when her father went to Canada to investigate the Lower Canada Rebellion in 29 May – 1 November 1838. She later returned to Canada with her husband, James Bruce, 8th Earl of Elgin, from 1847 to 1853.

== Writer and illustrator of journals ==
An accomplished artist, she studied under John Richard Coke-Smyth, alongside her sister, Lady Emily Augusta, and travel companion, Katherine Ellice. She wrote and illustrated journals and diaries of her international travels.
