= Robert Balfour, 6th of Balbirnie =

British Army general

Lieutenant-General Robert Balfour
- Born: 3 May 1772; Fifeshire, Scotland
- Died: 31 October 1837 (aged 65)
- Spouse: Eglantyne Katherine Fordyce (m. 1808)
- Children: 7
- Military career
- Allegiance: United Kingdom
- Branch: British Army
- Service years: 1791–1837
- Rank: Lieutenant-general
- Commands: 2nd Dragoons

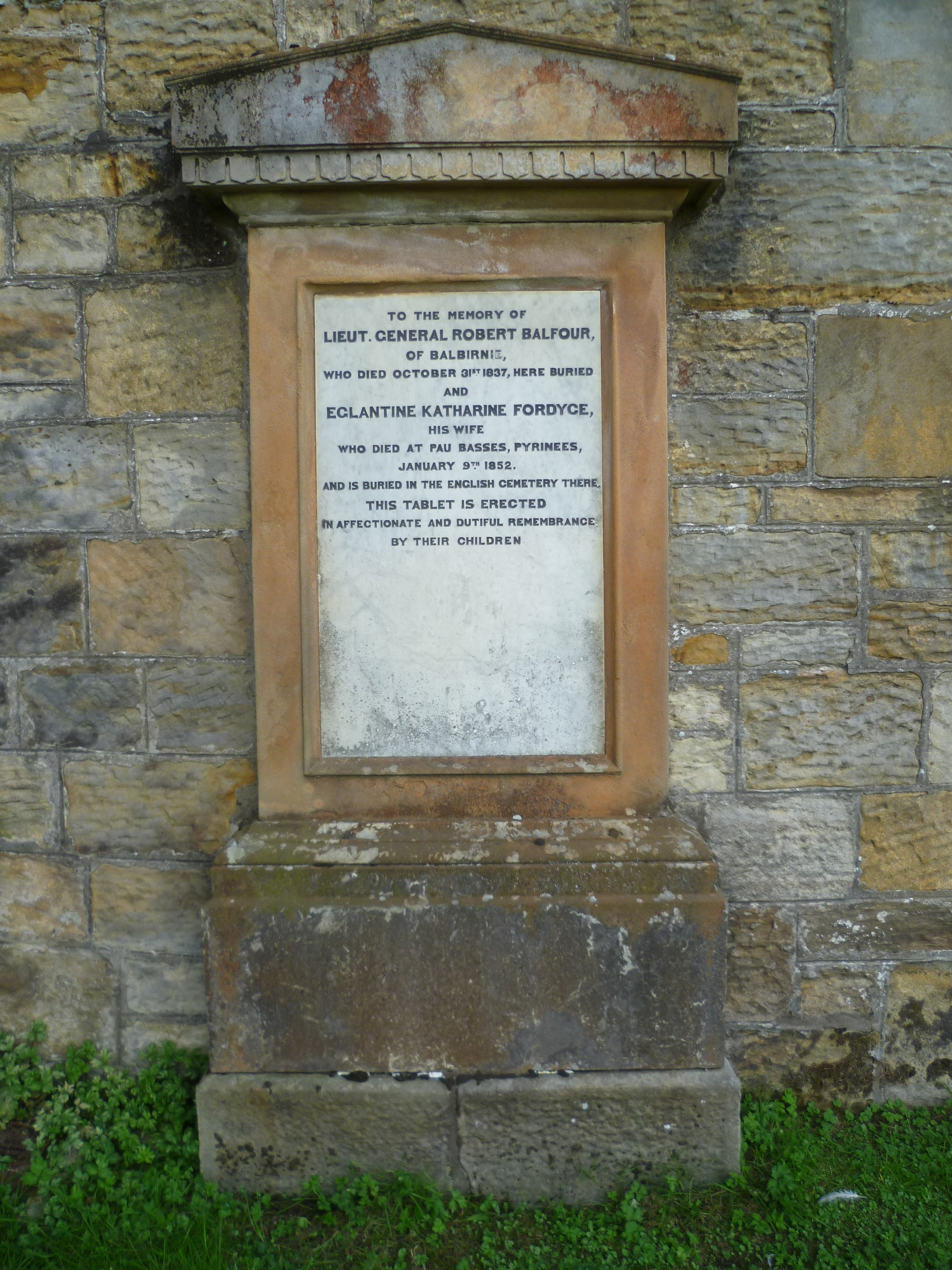
Memorial tablet at Markinch, Fife

Lieutenant-General Robert Balfour of Balbirnie (3 May 1772 – 31 October 1837) was a son of John Balfour of Balbirnie and Mary Gordon, daughter of James Gordon of Ellon. He was an officer in the 2nd Dragoons and the Fife Light Horse. His younger brother James (died 1845) was an MP and grandfather of Arthur Balfour, Prime Minister of the United Kingdom from 1903 to 1905.

== Military career ==
- Captain on 9 July 1793 in the 2nd Dragoons
- Major in the Army on 1 January 1798 and Major in the 2nd Dragoons, 3 April 1801
- Lieutenant-Colonel in the Army on 25 September 1803; Lieutenant-Colonel in the 2nd Dragoons on 22 August 1805
- Colonel in the Army on 1 January 1812
- Major-General on 4 June 1814
- Honorary Colonel of the Fife Light Horse in 1831 until his death in 1837

While Lieutenant-Colonel of the 2nd Dragoons, he was, for the misconstruction of a regulation, subjected to a court-martial, and sentenced to be cashiered; the Prince Regent confirmed the sentence, but immediately after restored him to the functions of his commission, neither dishonorable or unworthy motives appearing in the charges preferred and established against him.

== Balbirnie House and estate ==
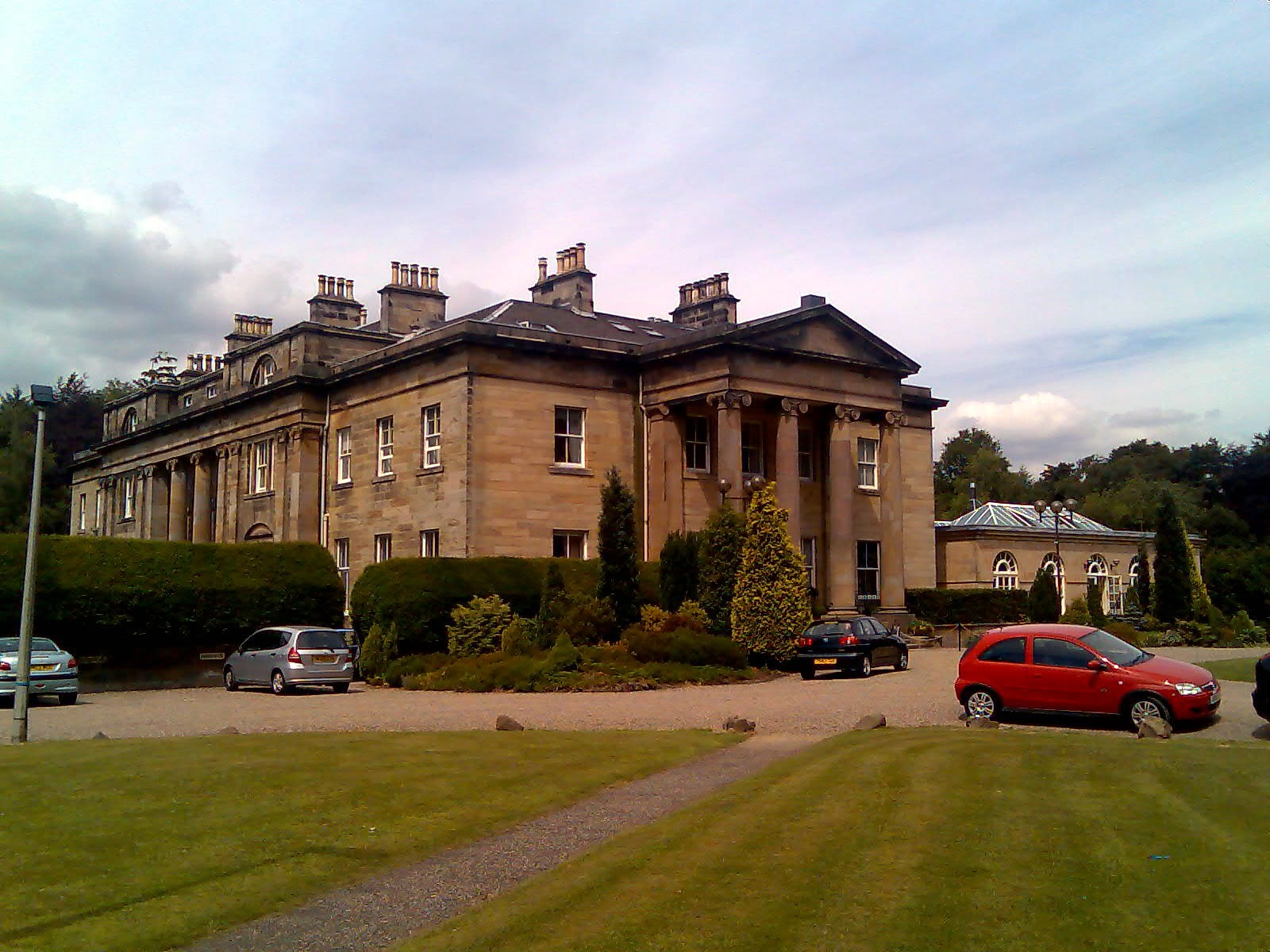
Balbirnie House as it is today

When not living at his London residence of 14 Carlton House Terrace, General Balfour spent much of his time in Fife, Scotland.

He inherited Balbirnie House in Glenrothes from his father John Balfour and it had been in the family since the 1640s. General Balfour was heavily involved in the adaptation of Balbirnie House into a grand country mansion and expansion of its lands, including the acquisition of the Forthar estate from Dr David Pitcairn in 1830.

The present mansion is largely unchanged from General Balfour's works in 1815 which incorporated much of the earlier house at its north end. The architect was Richard Crichton who added the new apartments to the south of the old house and designed the two new grand neo-classical facades.

General Balfour extend the landscaped garden and moved the roads on the estate. These improvements were funded partly by increased estate rentals and income from coal mining but also from the General's share of a large inheritance from his aunt which is reputed also to have funded his two brothers' new houses and landscaping at Whittingehame and Newton Don. General Balfour was succeeded by his son John in 1837 who continued to enlarge the estate.

== Family ==
He married, on 8 August 1808, Eglantyne Katherine Fordyce (d 9 Jan 1851), who was the daughter of John Fordyce of Ayton. General Balfour had four sons and three daughters:

- Colonel John Balfour, 7th of Balbirnie (1811–1895)
- Katherine Jane Balfour (1812–1864), diarist and artist, married the Scottish politician Edward Ellice
- Captain Charles James Balfour (1814 – 3 February 1878)
- Major Robert William Balfour (1817–1854)
- Eglantine Charlotte Louisa Balfour (1819 – 18 April 1907), married in March 1853 to Robert Ellice, son of Eliza Courtney
- Elizabeth Anne Balfour (1820 – 10 August 1889), married on 1 November 1842 to the Rt. Hon. Edward Pleydell-Bouverie, second son of William Pleydell-Bouverie, 3rd Earl of Radnor
- George Gordon Balfour (1821–1901)
