= Coke Smyth =

British artist and traveller

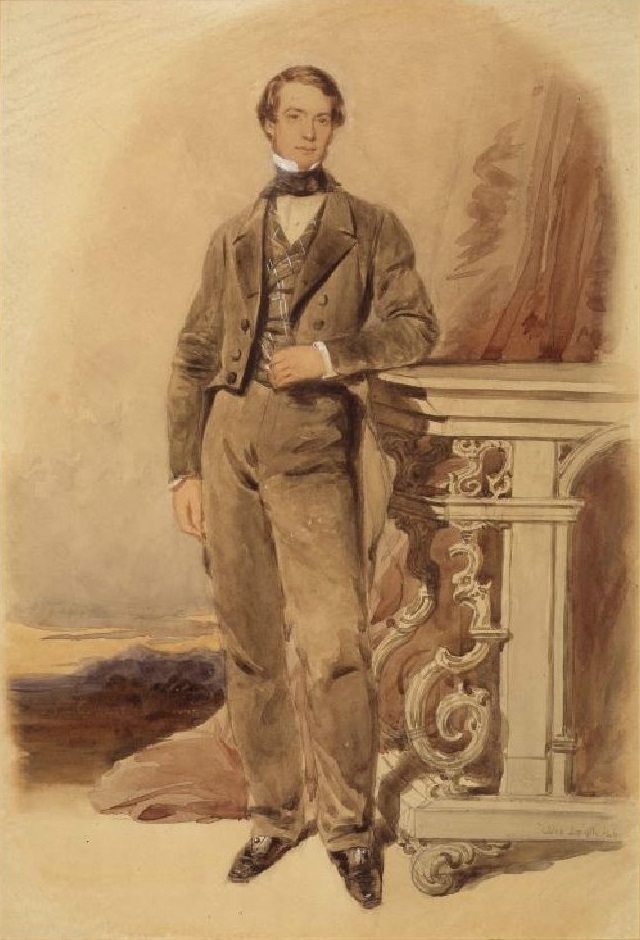
Self-portrait of Coke Smyth, 1846

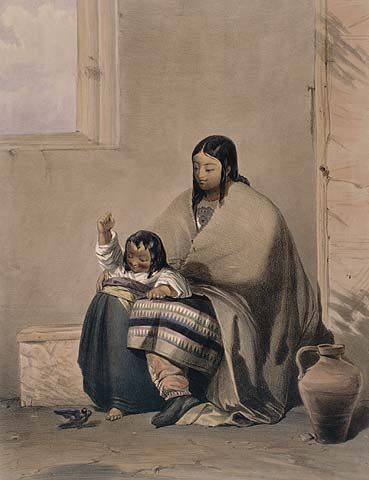
Zity a Huron indian

John Richard Coke Smyth (1808–1882) was a British artist and traveller. Smyth produced a few collections of prints from his travels. A few works arose out of a visit to Constantinople where he collaborated with the noted Orientalist painter John Frederick Lewis to produce several works on Turkey and Constantinople.

== Life ==
His father was Richard Smyth and his mother was Elizabeth Coke. He traveled to Constantinople in 1856 and 1857.

In 1838, John Lambton, 1st Earl of Durham accepted the post of Governor-General of British North America, and arrived in Quebec with his family and an entourage of about twenty people.

Several visual documents remain from this sojourn. These include works by Coke Smyth (1808-1882), whom Lord Durham had engaged to teach drawing to his family, by Lord Durham's daughter, Lady Mary Louisa Lambton, and by the amateur watercolorist, Katherine Ellice, (1814-1864), wife of Edward Ellice, secretary to the Governor."

After his return to England, Coke Smyth sketched the illustrations of the costumes that were used to make the prints for of the Bal Costume, given by H.M. Queen Victoria at Buckingham Palace, May 12, 1842. The book commemorated a fancy ball given by Queen Victoria in 1842.

== Publications ==
- 1808 – Scenes from Hamlet and All's Well.
- 1837 – Lewis's illustrations of Constantinople : made during a residence in that city etc. in the years 1835-6 : arranged and drawn on stone from the original sketches of Coke Smyth Istanbul : Denizler Kitabevi, ISBN 9789944264365, OCLC 774986610
- 1839 – Sketches in the Canadas. [dedicated to the Earl of Durham]. London: Thos. McLean.
- Undated – Prospectus and Specimen of a Proposed Work on the Costume of the Principal Nations of Europe: From the Beginning of the 15th to the End of the 17th Century. London.

In collaboration with John Frederick Lewis

- 1838 – Bursa, Turkey: the Street at the Entrance to the Grand Mosque. Lithograph by John .F. Lewis, After Coke Smythe. London: T. McLean et al.
- 1838 – Bursa, Turkey: the Silk Exchange. Lithograph by John F. Lewis, 1838, After Coke Smythe. London: T. McLean et al.
- 1838 – Tophane, Istanbul: the Ottoman Cannon Foundry. Lithograph by John .F. Lewis, 1838, After Coke Smythe. London: T. McLean et al.

In collaboration with James Planché

- 1843 – Souvenir of the Bal Costume: Given by Her Most Gracious Majesty Queen Victoria, at Buckingham Palace, May 12, 1842; the Drawings from the Original Dresses. London: Colnaghi.
