= List of listed buildings in Blair Atholl, Perth and Kinross =

This is a list of listed buildings in the parish of Blair Atholl in Perth and Kinross, Scotland.

== List ==
Name	Location	Date Listed	Grid Ref. (Note: Sometimes known as OSGB36, the grid reference (where provided) is based on the British national grid reference system used by the Ordnance Survey. • "Guide to National Grid". Ordnance Survey. • "Get-a-map". Ordnance Survey.)	Geo-coordinates	Notes	LB Number (Note: Historic Environment Scotland assign a unique alphanumeric identifier to each designated site in Scotland, for listed buildings this always begins with "LB", for example "LB12345".)	Image
Cumhann-Leum Bridge Over River Tilt				56°47′40″N 3°50′00″W	Category B	6034	Upload Photo
Tenandry Church				56°43′57″N 3°46′53″W	Category B	6043	Upload Photo
Bonskeid House				56°43′42″N 3°48′36″W	Category B	6047	Upload Photo
West Lodge, Bonskeid				56°43′38″N 3°49′31″W	Category C(S)	6048	Upload Photo
Black Castle (Caisteal Dubh)				56°43′31″N 3°49′54″W	Category C(S)	6049	Upload Photo
Front Lodge, Blair Castle				56°46′01″N 3°50′45″W	Category A	6064	Upload another image
Grotto On River Tilt Opposite York Cascade				56°46′29″N 3°50′29″W	Category A	6065	Upload Photo
Footbridge From Diana's Wilderness To Old Blair Garden				56°46′37″N 3°51′22″W	Category C(S)	6071	Upload Photo
Garryside				56°45′48″N 3°50′52″W	Category B	6108	Upload Photo
Viewpoint, Falls Of The Bruar				56°46′34″N 3°55′52″W	Category C(S)	6007	Upload Photo
Gilbert's Bridge Over River Tilt				56°48′31″N 3°50′03″W	Category B	6035	Upload Photo
Old Stables, Lude				56°46′11″N 3°49′35″W	Category B	6057	Upload Photo
Old Bridge Of Tilt Atholl Bank Cottage, Drying Kiln Only				56°46′34″N 3°50′19″W	Category B	6058	Upload Photo
Foot Bridge And Adjoining Garden Walls Over East Lodge Road Near Old Bridge Of Tilt				56°46′32″N 3°50′28″W	Category C(S)	6066	Upload Photo
Sundial				56°46′24″N 3°51′32″W	Category A	6076	Upload another image
The Obelisk				56°46′31″N 3°51′32″W	Category B	6083	Upload Photo
Village Hall, Blair Atholl (Scottish Horse Drill Hall)				56°45′57″N 3°50′46″W	Category B	6104	Upload Photo
Blair Cottages. (Post Office, Seaton, Shanto, Grant, Duncan And Wood)				56°45′57″N 3°50′51″W	Category B	6105	Upload another image
Auchleeks House, Stable Block				56°45′17″N 4°03′45″W	Category B	6002	Upload Photo
Chamberbane Crucked Cottage (Now Store)				56°42′54″N 3°55′46″W	Category B	6004	Upload Photo
South Bridge Over Falls Of The Bruar				56°46′26″N 3°56′03″W	Category B	6006	Upload Photo
Tirinie Lodge				56°47′03″N 3°49′31″W	Category C(S)	6017	Upload Photo
West Bridge Over Croft Crombie Burn, Glen Tilt				56°47′50″N 3°50′29″W	Category C(S)	6032	Upload Photo
Dalnamein Bridge (Large) On Former Route Of A9				56°48′02″N 4°02′21″W	Category B	50911	Upload Photo
Killiecrankie Bridge Over River Garry				56°43′40″N 3°46′33″W	Category B	6041	Upload Photo
Robert Stuart Of Fincastle Burial Enclosure 1/2 Mile S. Of Glen Fincastle Chapel				56°43′53″N 3°50′56″W	Category C(S)	6050	Upload Photo
Fender Cottage, Fenderbridge				56°46′44″N 3°50′00″W	Category C(S)	6062	Upload Photo
Old Blair Bridge Over Banvie Burn				56°46′36″N 3°51′25″W	Category B	6072	Upload Photo
Blair Atholl War Memorial				56°45′58″N 3°50′55″W	Category B	6107	Upload Photo
Tilt Railway Viaduct				56°45′53″N 3°50′38″W	Category B	6110	Upload Photo
Tilt Cottages, Bridge Of Tilt				56°46′01″N 3°50′15″W	Category C(S)	6111	Upload Photo
Auchleeks House, Walled Garden And Gates				56°45′21″N 4°03′37″W	Category B	6001	Upload Photo
Bridge In Clunes Wood Over Allt A' Chrombaidh ('The Eye Of The Window')				56°46′37″N 3°58′51″W	Category C(S)	6010	Upload Photo
Dail-An-Eas Bridge Over River Tilt				56°51′04″N 3°44′31″W	Category B	6037	Upload Photo
Bridge Of Tilt Lodge, Lude				56°46′06″N 3°50′23″W	Category B	6055	Upload Photo
Old Blair				56°46′37″N 3°51′20″W	Category B	6070	Upload Photo
Bridge Over Banvie Burn In Diana's Wilderness, N. Of Item 39				56°46′29″N 3°51′28″W	Category C(S)	6078	Upload Photo
Statue Of Hercules				56°46′27″N 3°51′01″W	Category B	6081	Upload Photo
The Dairy, The Mains				56°46′17″N 3°51′26″W	Category C(S)	6082	Upload Photo
Kilmaveonaig Chapel (Episcopal)				56°46′11″N 3°50′06″W	Category B	6112	Upload Photo
Bridge Over Banvie Burn N. Of The Whim				56°46′59″N 3°52′12″W	Category C(S)	6028	Upload Photo
East Bridge Over Croft Crombie Burn, Glen Tilt				56°47′50″N 3°50′26″W	Category C(S)	6033	Upload Photo
Gow's Bridge Over River Tilt				56°49′29″N 3°48′07″W	Category B	6036	Upload another image See more images
Limekiln, Near Essangal				56°45′30″N 3°48′53″W	Category B	6038	Upload Photo
Shierglas, Farmhouse				56°45′24″N 3°49′36″W	Category B	6039	Upload Photo
Coillebrochaim				56°43′27″N 3°47′07″W	Category C(S)	6044	Upload Photo
East Lodge, Bonskeid				56°43′43″N 3°48′18″W	Category C(S)	6046	Upload Photo
Trinafour Sawmill				56°45′23″N 4°05′06″W	Category C(S)	6053	Upload Photo
Bridge Over Fender. W. Of Fenderbridge				56°46′41″N 3°50′13″W	Category C(S)	6063	Upload Photo
Bailanloan				56°46′48″N 3°51′00″W	Category B	6069	Upload Photo
Parish Church, Blair Atholl				56°46′00″N 3°50′36″W	Category B	6101	Upload Photo
Atholl Arms Hotel, Blair Atholl				56°45′56″N 3°50′55″W	Category C(S)	6106	Upload another image
North Bridge Over Falls Of The Bruar				56°46′44″N 3°55′57″W	Category B	6008	Upload Photo
Tirinie House				56°47′17″N 3°49′09″W	Category B	6015	Upload Photo
Lude House				56°46′08″N 3°49′25″W	Category B	6056	Upload Photo
Pond Cottage, Lude				56°46′12″N 3°49′35″W	Category B	6060	Upload Photo
'Fenderbridge', Fenderbridge				56°46′44″N 3°50′01″W	Category C(S)	6061	Upload Photo
Blair Castle				56°46′24″N 3°51′27″W	Category A	6074	Upload another image
Bridge Over Banvie Burn, N. Of Blair Castle				56°46′27″N 3°51′26″W	Category C(S)	6077	Upload Photo
Walled Garden				56°46′30″N 3°51′01″W	Category B	6080	Upload Photo
School And Schoolhouse, Blair Atholl				56°46′01″N 3°50′33″W	Category C(S)	6102	Upload Photo
Struan Church And Churchyard				56°45′52″N 3°57′00″W	Category B	6003	Upload Photo
Drochaid Dail An Fhrasich Bridge Over River Garry				56°48′16″N 4°05′15″W	Category B	6013	Upload Photo
Dalnacardoch Lodge				56°48′23″N 4°05′43″W	Category B	6014	Upload Photo
Old Manse Of Blair, Baluain				56°46′15″N 3°54′18″W	Category C(S)	6030	Upload Photo
Ruins Of Lude Kirk, Kirkton Of Lude, Glen Fender				56°47′51″N 3°47′51″W	Category B	6031	Upload Photo
Old Fincastle House				56°44′15″N 3°51′09″W	Category A	69	Upload Photo
Killiecrankie Cottage				56°44′30″N 3°46′36″W	Category B	6042	Upload Photo
Balavoulin (Milton Lodge On Map)				56°43′54″N 3°50′37″W	Category B	6051	Upload Photo
Old Trinafour Bridge Over R. Errochty				56°45′24″N 4°05′13″W	Category B	6052	Upload Photo
Obelisk, Tom-Na-Croiche (Balvenie Pillar)				56°46′35″N 3°50′45″W	Category B	6067	Upload Photo
Terrace				56°46′25″N 3°51′35″W	Category B	6075	Upload Photo
The Whim				56°46′50″N 3°52′08″W	Category B	6084	Upload Photo
Bridge Of Tilt				56°46′04″N 3°50′27″W	Category B	6109	Upload Photo
Struan Bridge Over Errochty Water				56°45′51″N 3°56′59″W	Category B	6005	Upload Photo
Lady Jean's Well				56°46′57″N 3°51′49″W	Category B	6027	Upload Photo
Tummel Garry Hydro Electric Scheme, Errochty Dam Including Tunnel Intake Gatehouse				56°45′52″N 4°06′19″W	Category B	51714	Upload Photo
Shierglas Steading				56°45′25″N 3°49′36″W	Category C(S)	6040	Upload Photo
Coille Bhrochain Cottage				56°43′38″N 3°46′46″W	Category C(S)	6045	Upload Photo
Auchleeks House				56°45′23″N 4°03′37″W	Category A	6054	Upload Photo
Lude Walled Garden				56°45′59″N 3°49′09″W	Category C(S)	6059	Upload Photo
Blairuachdar				56°47′15″N 3°50′41″W	Category B	6068	Upload Photo
St. Bride's Church, Old Blair				56°46′34″N 3°51′18″W	Category B	6073	Upload Photo
Statue Of Diana And Actaeon, Diana's Wilderness				56°46′33″N 3°51′32″W	Category B	6079	Upload Photo
Blair Atholl Mill				56°45′53″N 3°50′50″W	Category B	6103	Upload another image
Clunes Lodge				56°46′47″N 3°59′46″W	Category B	6009	Upload Photo
Old Bridge Over Allt Anndeir, Near Dail-Na-Mine Lodge				56°48′06″N 4°02′26″W	Category C(S)	6011	Upload Photo
Bruar Lodge, Glen Bruar				56°46′17″N 3°55′52″W	Category C(S)	6012	Upload Photo
Tirinie Farmhouse And Steading				56°36′51″N 3°58′07″W	Category C(S)	6016	Upload Photo
West Lodge				56°46′13″N 3°54′05″W	Category B	6029	Upload Photo
Cottages, Old Blair				56°46′37″N 3°51′16″W	Category C(S)	5703	Upload Photo

== Key ==
The scheme for classifying buildings in Scotland is:

- Category A: "buildings of national or international importance, either architectural or historic; or fine, little-altered examples of some particular period, style or building type."
- Category B: "buildings of regional or more than local importance; or major examples of some particular period, style or building type, which may have been altered."
- Category C: "buildings of local importance; lesser examples of any period, style, or building type, as originally constructed or moderately altered; and simple traditional buildings which group well with other listed buildings."

In March 2016 there were 47,288 listed buildings in Scotland. Of these, 8% were Category A, and 50% were Category B, with the remaining 42% being Category C.
