= Atholl Arms Hotel, Blair Atholl =

Hotel in Dunkeld, Scotland

Atholl Arms Hotel
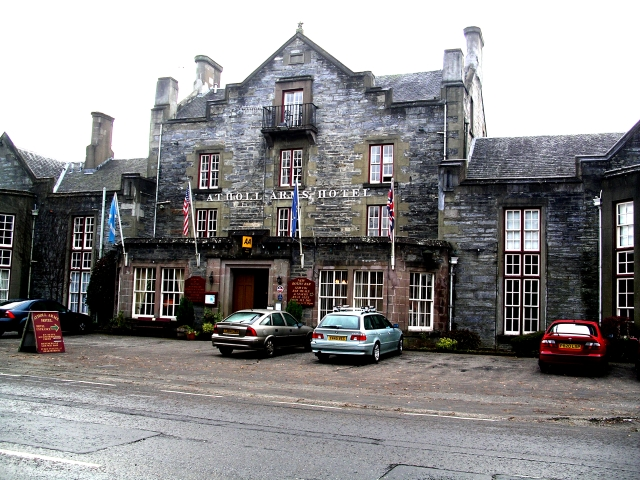
- The hotel in 2005

- Location within Perth and Kinross

General information
- Type: Hotel and restaurant
- Location: Blair Atholl, Scotland
- Coordinates: 56°45′56″N 3°50′55″W
- Completed: 1832; 194 years ago

Technical details
- Floor count: 3

Design and construction
- Architecture firm: R & R Dickson

Other information
- Public transit: Blair Atholl

Website
- www.athollarmshotel.co.uk

Listed Building – Category C(S)
- Official name: ATHOLL ARMS HOTEL, BLAIR ATHOLL
- Designated: 5 October 1971
- Reference no.: LB6106

The Atholl Arms Hotel is a hotel and restaurant in Blair Atholl, Perth and Kinross, Scotland. Standing on the B8079, it is a Category C listed building dating to 1832.

== Gallery ==
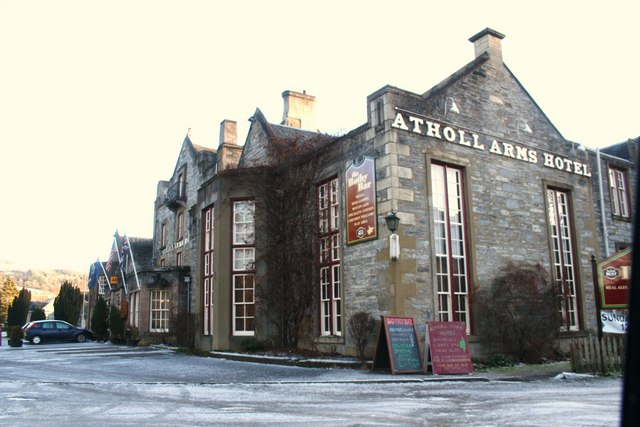
The western side of the building, 2011

== See also ==
- List of listed buildings in Blair Atholl, Perth and Kinross
