= Collessie =

Village and parish in Fife, Scotland

Coordinates: 56.306°N 3.155°W

Collessie: Scottish Gaelic: Cùil Easaidh
- Location within Fife
- OS grid reference: NO286132
- Council area: Fife
- Lieutenancy area: Fife
- Country: Scotland
- Sovereign state: United Kingdom
- Police: Scotland
- Fire: Scottish
- Ambulance: Scottish
- UK Parliament: North East Fife
- Scottish Parliament: North East Fife

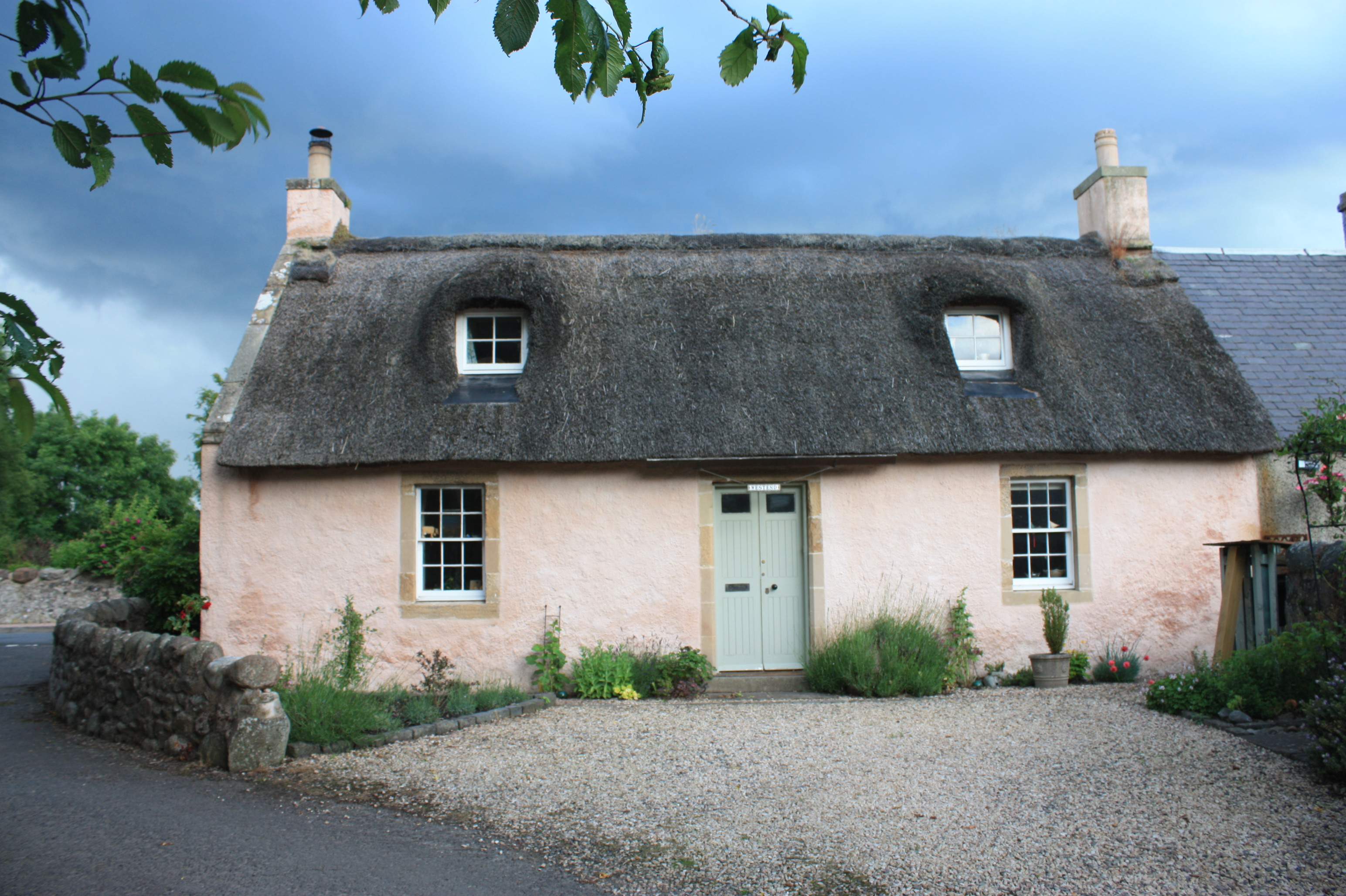
A traditionally thatched cottage, Collessie, Fife

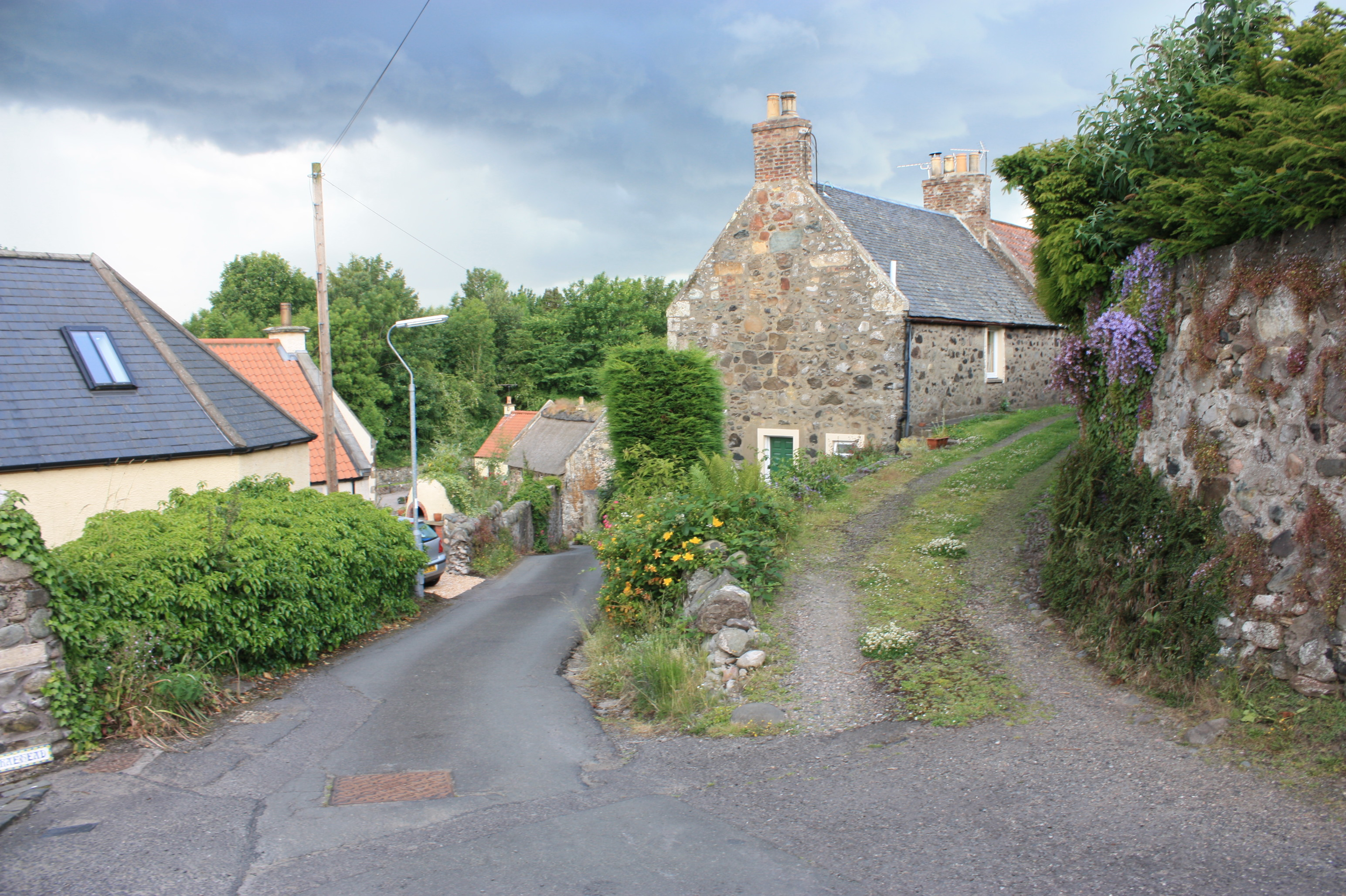
The old lanes of Collessie, Fife

Collessie is a village and parish of Fife, Scotland. The village is set on a small hillock centred on a historic church. Due to rerouting of roads, it now lies north of the A91. Though a railway embankment was constructed through the middle of the village in the 19th century, it retains many of its traditional 17th–18th century houses. In recent years some of the older houses have been re-roofed in traditional thatch.

== Name ==
Collessie's name derives from Scottish Gaelic although the exact derivation is unknown. The first element is either cùl (behind) or cùil (nook) and the last element may be either eas (waterfall) or lios (enclosure, garden).

== Demographics ==
The civil parish had a population of 1,921 in 2011.

== Notable locations ==
=== The Church ===
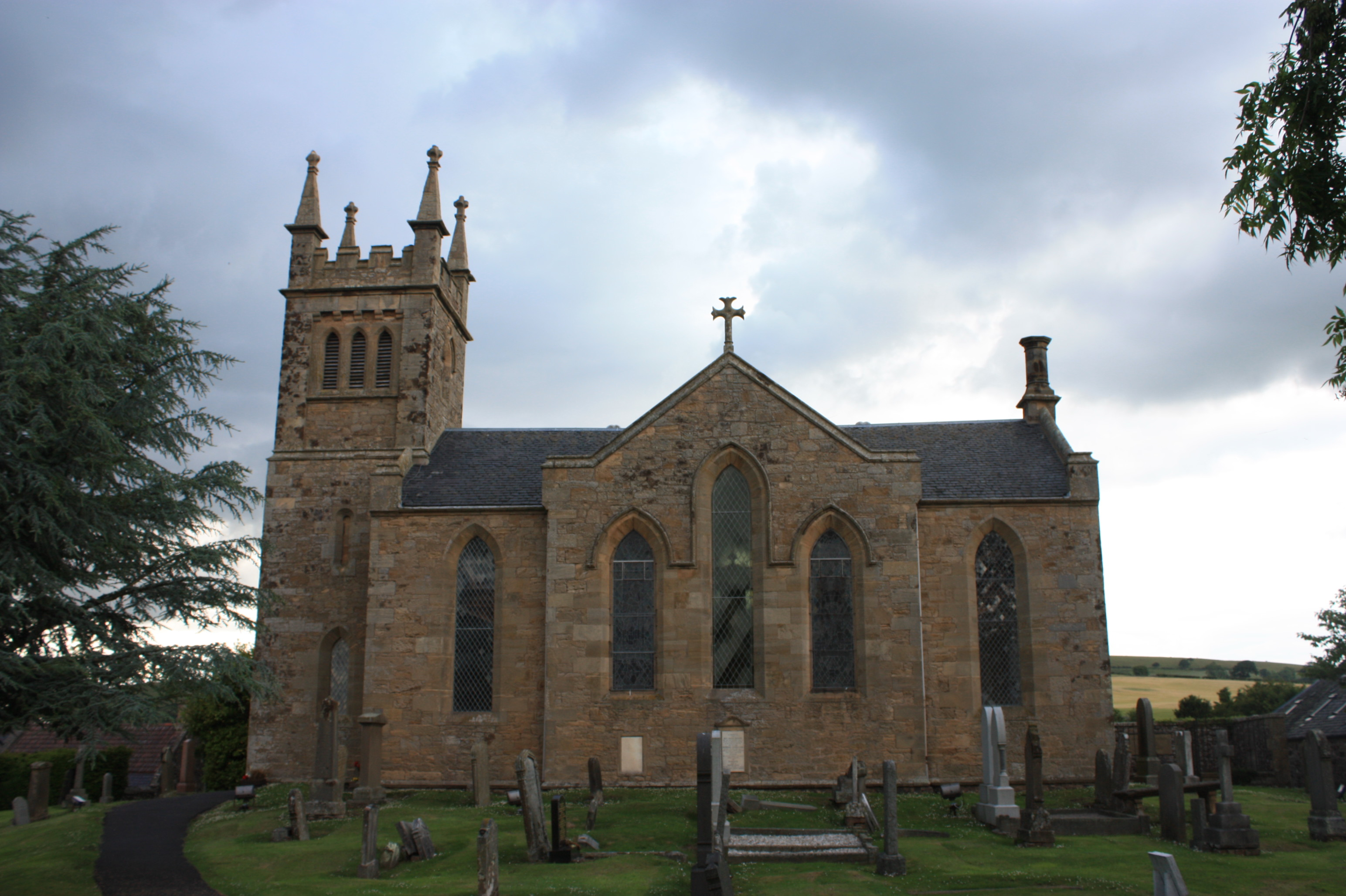
Collessie church, Fife

The church was consecrated by the Bishop David de Bernham of St. Andrews in July 30, 1243, and is mentioned in charters of both 1252 and 1262. Prior to the Reformation, the church was under the ownership of the Abbot of Lindores and was dedicated to the Virgin Mary.

In 1742 and 1743 the Rev Hugh Blair was the minister of Collessie.

The church was remodelled in 1838–39 by R & R Dickson to a T-plan form with a pinnacled western tower and has remained virtually unchanged since that date. The minister was the Rev John MacFarlane (1798-1875) who served from 1833 but left in the Disruption of 1843. The pulpit is in a central position at the head of the T, as in several Scottish churches including as Currie on the outskirts of Edinburgh. The pews date back to 1911, when they were adjusted to a less upright stance to improve comfort. The font dates from 1928.

The Collessie war memorial is in the east transept. The communion table was brought from Cowlairs Church in 1978 and was their war memorial.

In 2020 the church was listed for sale by the Church of Scotland. As of January 2022, a local resident planned to buy the church and remodel it into a home.

=== The Churchyard ===
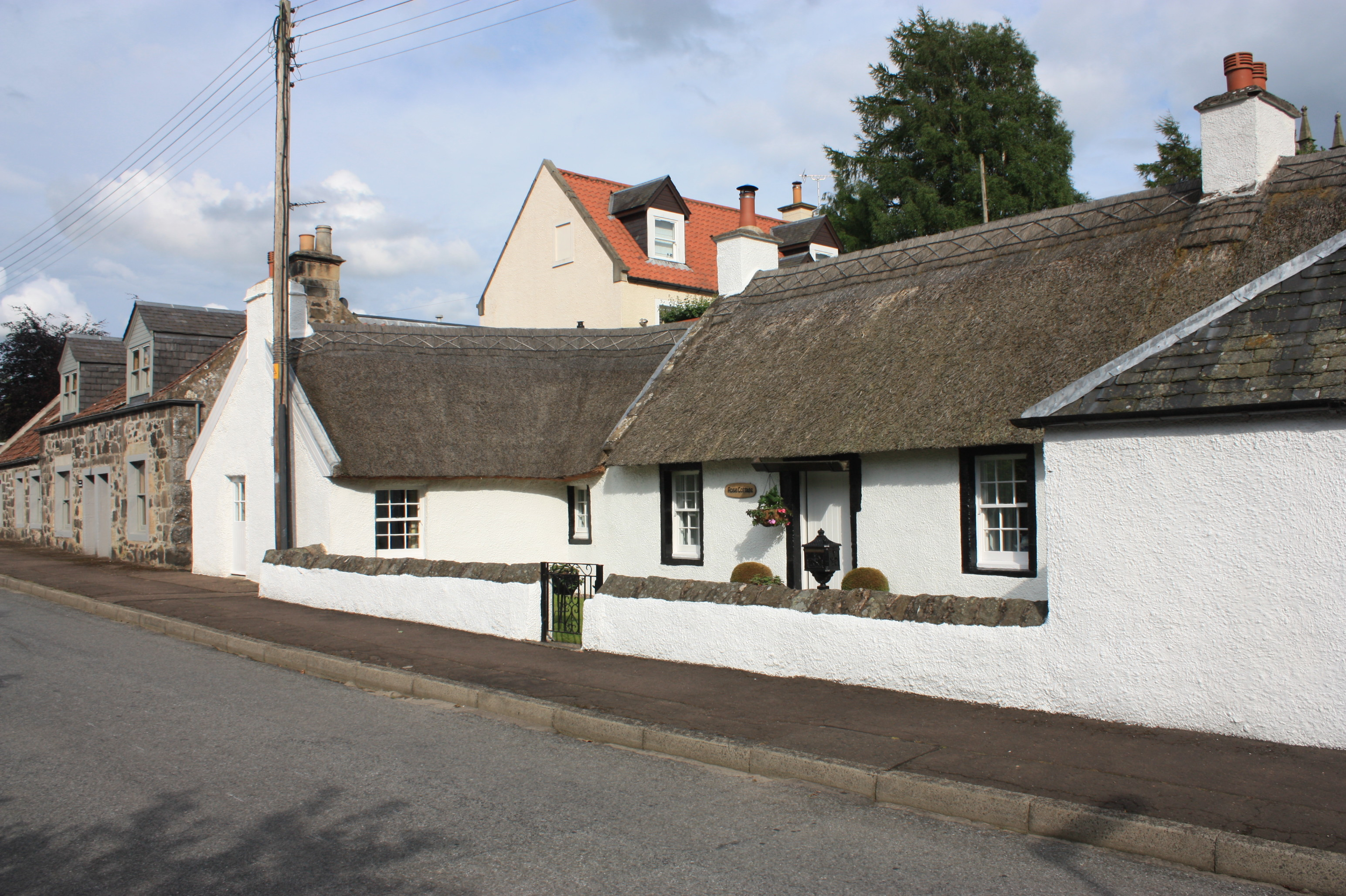
Thatched houses in Collessie, Fife

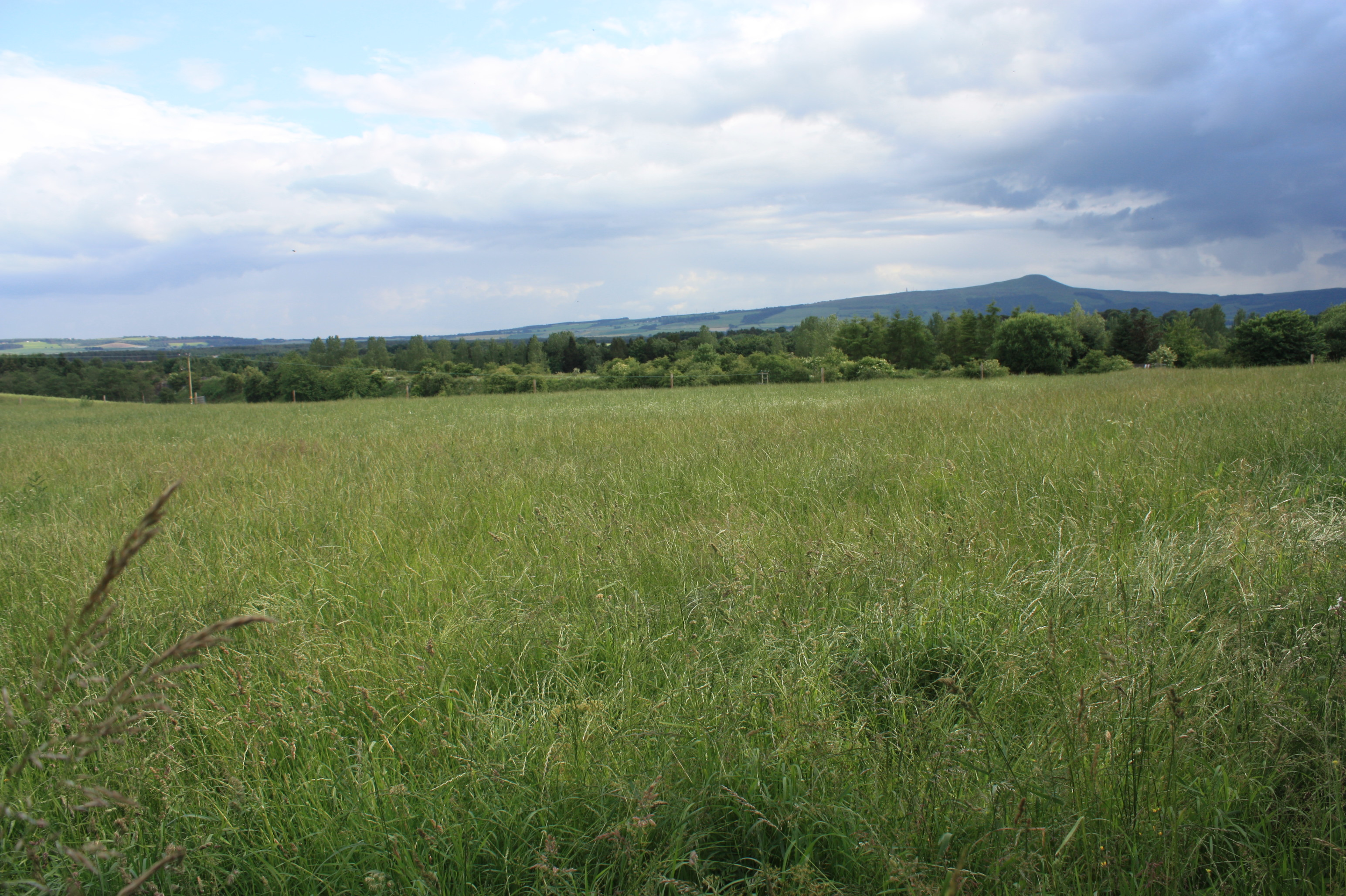
Countryside south of Collessie

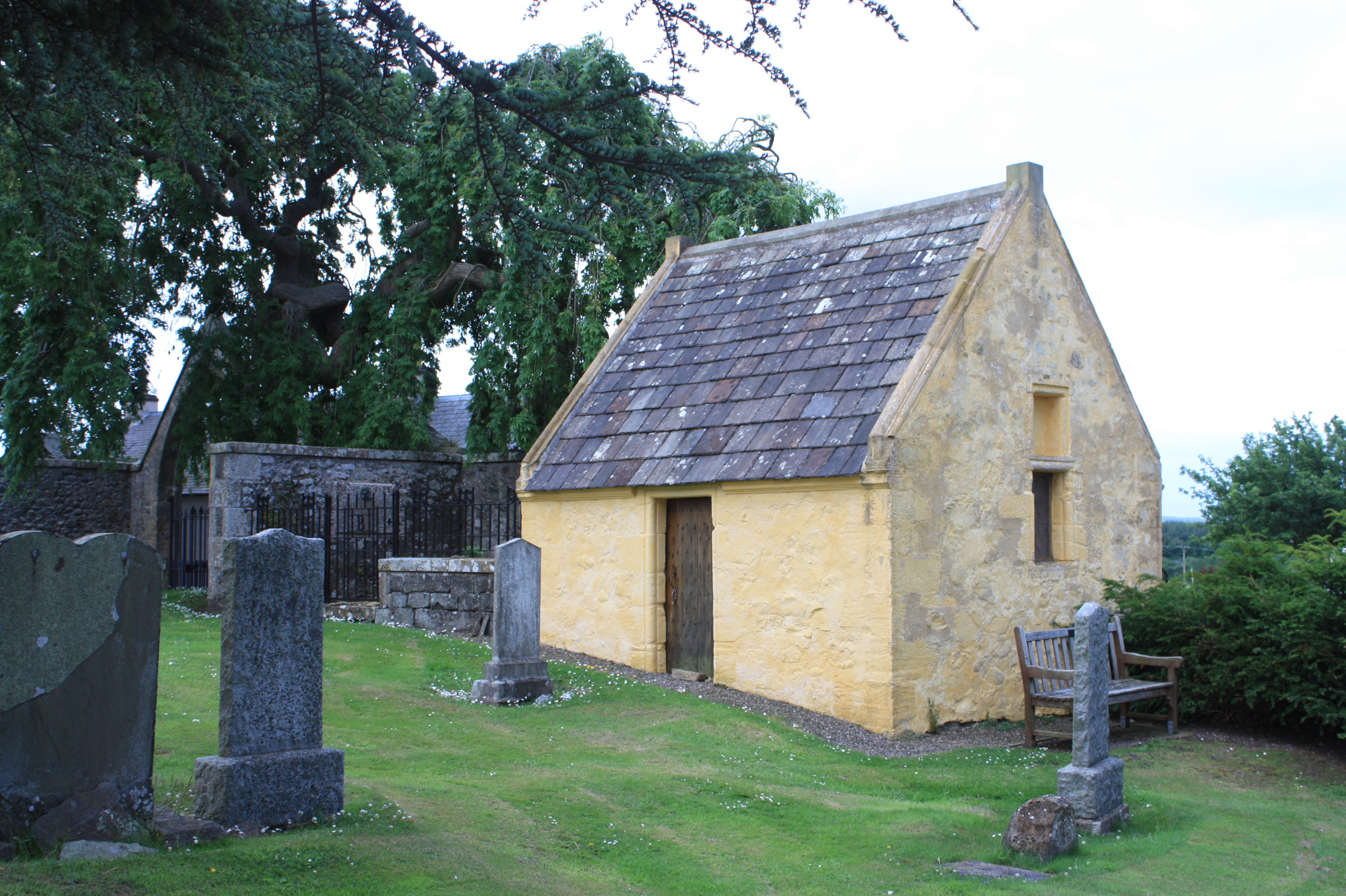
The tomb of Sir James Melville, Collessie, Fife

The churchyard has been in use since at least the 12th century. It was extended in 1840 and 1871 and was taken over by the local County Council in 1929, who still manage it as of 2022.

==== The Melville Tomb ====
The central feature of the churchyard is the Melville Tomb, the mausoleum of the local family of Melville of Halhill or Easter Collessie, It was erected in 1609 to house the remains of Christian Boswell, the wife of the courtier, diplomat and memoirist James Melville of Halhill. She was a Boswell of Balmuto, an estate north of Burntisland.

James Melville and Christian Boswell had four children; the most well known being the poet Elizabeth Melville, Lady Culross, who named one of her daughters Christian. Presumably, the mausoleum received Sir James's body in 1617, and is now somewhat inaccurately described on the information board next to it simply as "the tomb of Sir James Melville of Halhill". The Collessie mausoleum gradually fell prey to neglect and became a ruin: the carved heraldic shields that once filled niches on the walls are gone, as has the date "1609", recorded as late as 1895.

Before restoration in 2004, the Melville Tomb was already well known in funerary literature, because it bears two seven-line stanzas of Scots language verse. These are inscribed on the outer wall, which forms part of the churchyard boundary, and overlooks what was formerly the principal highway to St Andrews. Now damaged, it was transcribed and published complete in 1895. The poems are attributed to Elizabeth Melville.

The Collessie poem makes no mention of Christian Boswell or James Melville, but constitutes a short sermon about sin, redemption, death, burial and resurrection. The second stanza sternly denounces the widespread practice of burying bodies inside churches, and its striking first line has twice been used in the titles of articles on burial practices.

Ye loadin pilgrims passing langs this way
Pans on your fall, and your offencis past, ponder
How your frail flesh first formit of the clay
In dust mon be desolvit at the last:
Repent, amend, on Christ the burden cast
Of your sad sinnes, quha can your sauls refresh
Syne rais from grave to gloir your grislie flesh.

Defyle not Chrysts kirk with your carrion,
A soleme sait for Gods service prepar[e]d,
For praier, preaching and communion:
Your burial suld be in the kirkyaird.
On your uprysing set your great regard,
Quhen saull and body ioynes, with joy to ring reign
In heaven for ay with Christ our head and king.

The poem, which uses 'rhyme royal' (known in Scotland as 'Troilus verse'), has been attributed to Christian Boswell's poet-daughter Elizabeth Melville on biographical and stylistic grounds. The original literary inspiration may have come from an inscription on the wall of Aberdour Kirk on the Fife coast, close to Balmuto Castle and to another Melville family seat, Rossend Castle in Burntisland (home of Elizabeth Melville's uncle Sir Robert of Murdocairnie, and then his son, Sir Robert of Burntisland):

Pans O pilgrim ponder
That passith by this way
Upon thine end
And thou sal fear to sin
And think also
Upon the latter day
When thou to God man count must give account
Then best thou now begin then

Which laid out as pentameter verse (with a hypermetric last line) would read:

Pans O pilgrim that passith by this way
Upon thine end, and thou sal fear to sin:
And think also upon the latter day,
When thou to God man count: then best thou now begin.

It has been suggested that 'pilgrim' alludes to the mediaeval pilgrimages to a well-known, now vanished healing well located near the church. However, 'when' (rather than Scots 'quhen') is suspicious in a supposedly pre-Reformation inscription. The word 'pilgrim' for all human beings on their earthly journey was a standard metaphor much used by Protestants, as the Collessie mausoleum inscription indicates. Elizabeth Melville repeatedly employs the term in her poetry.

It is possible that the Melville tomb inscription provided the inspiration for the Aberdour inscription. If the Aberdour inscription predates 1609 and the Collessie tomb, Elizabeth Melville could have known of it from the man who in 1603 became master of Culross grammar school – her fellow Presbyterian John Fairfoul, former minister of Aberdour, who had become minister of Dunfermline in 1598. Alternatively, Sir James Melville himself may have told his daughter about the Aberdour inscription (he is likely have had considerable input into the content of the poem on his wife's mausoleum). Aberdour is quite close both to Balmuto Castle where Christian Boswell was born, and to another Melville family seat, Rossend Castle in Burntisland, home of Sir James's elder brother Sir Robert of Murdocairnie, 1st Lord Melville, and then of his son, Sir Robert of Burntisland, 2nd Lord Melville. Furthermore, Aberdour Kirk stands next to Aberdour Castle, one of the seats of the Douglas earls of Morton. It was therefore a residence of two important Scottish peers well known to Sir James Melville, namely the Regent Morton (died 1581) and the militantly Presbyterian Archibald Douglas, eighth Earl of Angus and fifth of Morton.

==== Other notable interments ====
- Sir William Oliphant Hutchison (1889–1970) artist, President of the Royal Scottish Academy
- John Cheape of Rossie, father of Sir John Cheape

=== The school ===
The school and schoolmaster's house date from 1846 providing free education (prior to the Education Act of 1872) from an early date. As with the church, it was designed by R & R Dickson.

== Notable residents ==
- John Balfour of Kinloch
- Rev George Kay minister from 1739 to 1741
