= Katherine Jane Ellice =

Scottish diarist and artist (1813–1864)

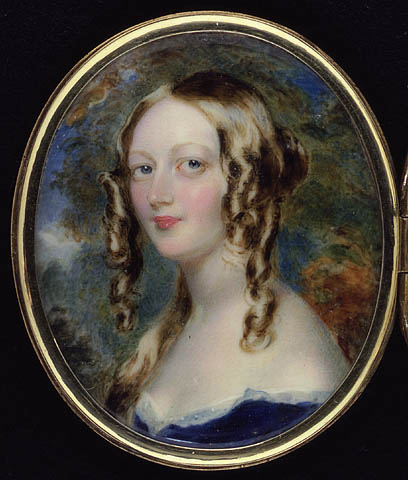
- by William Charles Ross R.A.
- Born: Katherine Jane Gordon Balfour; 1813; Scotland
- Died: 13 April 1864 (aged 50–51); Edinburgh, Scotland
- Other name: "Janie" Ellice
- Known for: Diarist; artist
- Spouse: Edward Ellice
- Parents: Sir Robert Balfour (father); Eglantine Katherine Fordyce (mother)

Katherine Jane "Janie" Gordon Ellice (née Balfour; 1813 – 13 April 1864) was a Scottish diarist and artist. She is most remembered for her chronicle and watercolours of a trip to Canada, in 1838, where she and her sister were taken prisoner during the Battle of Beauharnois.

== Life ==
She was born in 1813, the second daughter of eight children of Eglantine Katherine Fordyce (1789–1851) and Robert Balfour of Balbirnie. "She spoke Italian and French, was an accomplished sketcher and watercolourist, and played the piano and guitar." She married Edward Ellice on 15 July 1834.

On 24 April 1838, she boarded HMS Hastings and accompanied her husband, Edward Ellice to Canada in his capacity as private secretary to his cousin (by marriage) John Lambton, 1st Earl of Durham, who was en route to his appointments as Governor-General of the Province of Canada and Lieutenant-Governor of Lower Canada.

== Captivity during Battle of Beauharnois ==
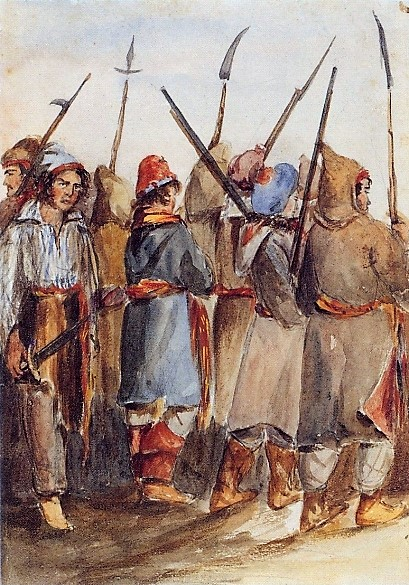
Patriots in November 1838 by Ellice

During the Battle of Beauharnois, she, her husband, and her sister—along with the general household—were taken by surprise during a nighttime siege led by François-Marie-Thomas Chevalier de Lorimier, then held as prisoners. Her husband was held separately. She negotiated with the rebels, and they were allowed to remove to the home of the Catholic priest, then allowed to obtain meat and milk from the Ellices' livestock, to sustain the, eventually, 62 people sequestered together in what she described as the Ellice house "converted into a regular prison".

A brisk firing commenced all around the cottage; bullets coming through the house in all directions. Then came a dreadful rush of Men, women & children, screaming, some falling & being trampled upon in the door way. We thought the rebels were coming to murder us, & locked in Tina's arms I was trying to compose my mind when Mr. Parker pushed thro' the crowd & told us we were safe.

That day, 10 November 1838, the British won the battle, rebel leaders were taken prisoner, and the loyalist prisoners were freed. Mrs. Ellice had written a diary and made sketches of the "picturesque ruffians". Lord Durham had resigned 9 October 1838, and returned to England, which the Ellice household had been scheduled to do on 9 November, but were then captives. They then returned to England on 26 December 1838.

== Art ==
Katherine Jane Ellice studied drawing with Lord Durham's drawing master, Coke Smyth, who gave lessons to Katherine and Lady Durham in Canada.

Her self-portrait at sea aboard HMS Hastings—the ship the Ellices had arrived to Canada aboard on 27 May 1838—is shown on this page.

Ellice's watercolour depictions of aspects of the 1837 Rebellion, painted while residing in Beauharnois, as well as other works representing Quebec, are included in her art album which is now held at the Library and Archives Canada. A copy of her diary is also housed at the Library and Archives Canada.

In 2015, her work was included in The Artist Herself: Self-Portraits by Canadian Historical Artists, an exhibition co-curated by Alicia Boutilier and Tobi Bruce who also co-edited the book/catalogue.

== Later life ==
Her father-in-law, Edward Ellice—who had furnished her with the diary and the task of filling it on her journey abroad—was a frequent host to notable visitors to Scotland, thought highly of "Janie" and so enlisted her, in 1859, as hostess, when the artist Richard Doyle visited; she was given an illustrated diary of a journey to the islands of Rona and Skye.

In 1853, her sister, Eglantyne "Tina", married the cousin of her husband, Robert Ellice (1816–1858), son of General Robert Ellice.

Following her death, in 1864, Edward Ellice remarried.
