= John Clitherow =

British Army general

Lieutenant-General John Clitherow

Deputy Governor General of the Province of Canada
- In office 18 September 1841 – 24 September 1841
- Monarch: Victoria
- Governor General: Lord Sydenham
- Premier: Sir Louis-Hippolyte Lafontaine; Robert Baldwin (Deputy Premier)

Member of the Special Council of Lower Canada
- In office 28 June 1838 – 2 November 1838
- Monarch: Victoria
- Governor General: Lord Durham

Personal details
- Born: 13 December 1782 Essendon, Hertfordshire
- Died: 14 October 1852 (aged 69) Boston Manor House, Brentford, England
- Spouse(s): (1) Sarah Christie Burton (1809) (2) Millicent Pole of Gloucestershire (1825)
- Children: John Christie Clitherow
- Parent(s): Christopher Clitherow and Anne Jodrell
- Occupation: Army officer

Military service
- Allegiance: United Kingdom
- Branch/service: British Army
- Years of service: 1799 – 1842
- Rank: Lieutenant-General
- Unit: Scots Fusilier Guards
- Commands: Commanding Officer, Military District of Montreal (1838–1841); Commanding Officer, Canada West (1841–1842)
- Battles/wars: Egyptian Campaign; Napoleonic Wars; Hanover Expedition; Walcheren Campaign; Peninsular War; Lower Canada Rebellion; Battle of Beauharnois
- Awards: Order of the Crescent

Lieutenant-General John Clitherow (13 December 1782 – 14 October 1852) was a British army officer and colonial administrator. He was briefly Deputy Governor-General of the Province of Canada in 1841.

== Early life and family ==
Clitherow was born at Essendon, Hertfordshire, England in 1782, the son of Christopher Clitherow and Anne Jodrell. He was descended from Sir Christopher Clitherow, Member of Parliament (1628-1629) and Lord Mayor of London in 1635. The Clitherow family were wealthy London merchants throughout the 17th and 18th centuries and owned Boston Manor House in Brentford (now part of London), from 1670 onwards.

Clitherow's Divorce Act 1819
- Act of Parliament
- Parliament of the United Kingdom
- Long title: An Act to dissolve the Marriage of John Clitherow Esquire, Captain in His Majesty's Third Regiment of Guards, and a Lieutenant Colonel in the Army, with Sarah Clitherow, his now Wife, and to enable him to marry again; and for other Purposes therein mentioned.
- Citation: 59 Geo. 3. c. 71 Pr.

Dates
- Royal assent: 19 May 1819

In 1809, Clitherow married Sarah Christie Burton, daughter of General Napier Christie Burton and granddaughter of General Gabriel Christie, who had served with the British Army in the Revolutionary War, afterwards settling in Lower Canada, where he acquired extensive land-holdings. Clitherow and his wife had one son, John Christie Clitherow, who eventually served in the Coldstream Guards. However, the marriage ended when Clitherow divorced Sarah in 1819, by a private act of Parliament, Clitherow's Divorce Act 1819 (59 Geo. 3. c. 71 Pr.). In 1825, Clitherow married Millicent Pole of Gloucestershire.

== Military career ==
Clitherow enlisted in the British Army as an ensign in 1799. He served in the Egyptian campaign of 1801, an expedition to Germany in 1805, and an expedition to the Netherlands in 1809. He participated in the Peninsular War from 1810 to 1815, being wounded twice. He was promoted to colonel in 1821, and to major-general in 1830.

In 1838, Clitherow was posted to British North America, to serve as commanding officer of the military district of Montreal. He was accompanied by his son, who served as his aide-de-camp. Clitherow arrived in Montreal in March, 1838, shortly after the Lower Canada Rebellion had broken out in late 1837.

He served as an advisor to Lord Durham as a member of the Special Council that administered Lower Canada following the rebellion.

When the second rebellion broke out Clitherow commanded 3,000 regulars that marched on rebel headquarters. He also presided over courts martial that prosecuted the rebels.

In 1841, he was transferred to Canada West to command British forces there.

== Deputy Governor General ==
The Governor General of the Province of Canada, Lord Sydenham, appointed him as Deputy Governor General. In that capacity, on 18 September 1841, Clitherow prorogued the first session of the first Parliament of the Province of Canada. Sydenham was unable to carry out his functions, as he had been badly injured by a fall from a horse. He died the day after Parliament was prorogued.

Clitherow remained the Deputy Governor General for six days, until the Commander-in-Chief of the British Army in Canada, Sir Richard Downes Jackson, was appointed as Administrator.

== Retirement and death ==
In 1842, Clitherow inherited the family estate, Boston Manor in Brentford, England. He retired to England that year.

Clitherow died at Boston Manor House in 1852.
