= Battle of Beauharnois =

Coordinates: 45.314°N 73.877°W

- Part of the Lower Canada Rebellion
Date	November 10, 1838
Location	Beauharnois, Quebec
Result	Loyalist victory

Belligerents
(United Kingdom of Great Britain and Ireland) British Empire	Patriote Movement

Commanders and leaders
James Macdonell; John Clitherow; Alexander Fraser	Chevalier de Lorimier (executed)

Units involved
1st Glengarry Militia; 71st Highlanders; Loyalist volunteers	Unknown

Strength
Unknown	500 men

Casualties and losses
Unknown	108 captured

The Battle of Beauharnois was fought on November 10, 1838, between Lower Canada loyalists and Patriote rebels, after 500 armed men had converged on Beauharnois, on November 3–4, overtaking the seigneurial manor.

The seigneury of Beauharnois belonged to the Ellice family, having, in 1796, purchased it from Michel Chartier de Lotbinière, Marquis de Lotbinière. Edward Ellice, private secretary to John Lambton, 1st Earl of Durham, had then been in residence for several months. He, and, separately, his wife, Lady Jane Ellice, and her sister, Eglantine "Tina" Balfour, later Ellice, were taken prisoner, along with a number of others. Ellice's watercolours, sketches and diary survived, and record that they were unharmed.

The town rose up, following a series of raids by rebel leaders who had escaped into the United States. François-Marie-Thomas Chevalier de Lorimier commanded the ranks of the Patriote rebels. The British were victorious, and 108 rebels were captured and tried in Montreal. 58 of the Patriote rebels were deported to Australia, while Lorimier was hanged.

Government forces burned several buildings in the area in reprisal for the rebels’ actions.

== See also ==
- Lower Canada Rebellion
