= Dunimarle Castle =

Coordinates: 56°03′18″N 3°38′37″W

Designations

Inventory of Gardens and Designed Landscapes in Scotland
- Official name: Dunimarle Castle
- Designated: 30 March 2005
- Reference no.: GDL00155

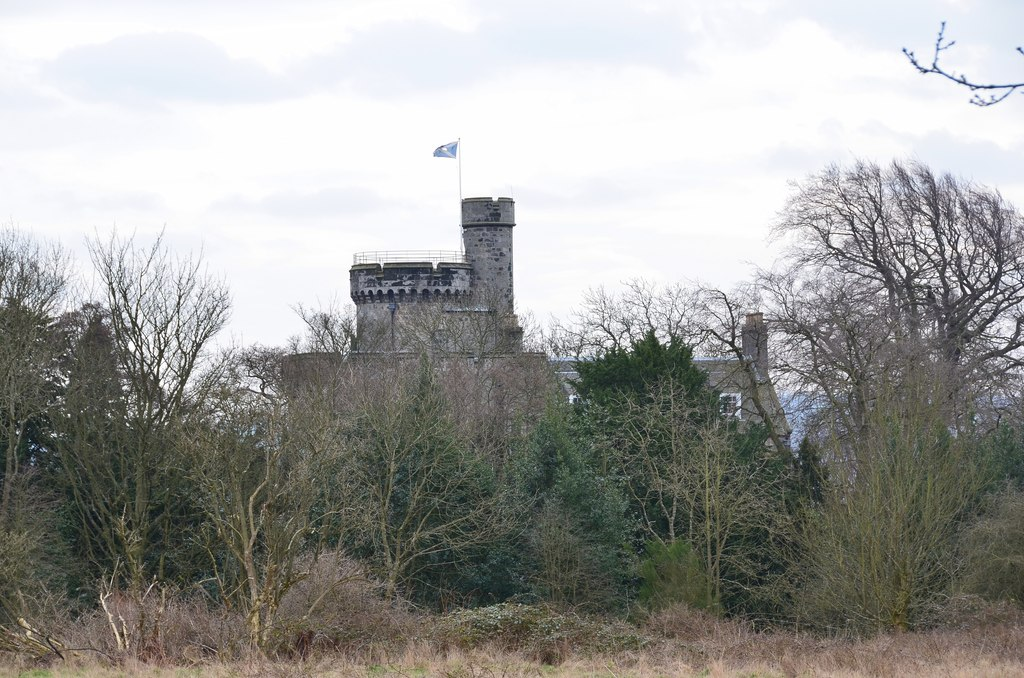
View of Dunimarle Castle

Dunimarle Castle is located 1 km west of the centre of the village of Culross in Fife, Scotland. The name 'Dunimarle' means 'castle by the sea', although the original name of the estate was 'Castlehill'. The mansion house is a Category A listed building and the ruins of the medieval castle are Category B listed. The grounds are included in the Inventory of Gardens and Designed Landscapes in Scotland.

== History ==
The original castle is now a ruin, but adjacent to it stands an 18th-century building, borrowing its name, constructed by the Erskine family. The house was rebuilt by R & R Dickson in 1839. Until recently it had some fine art which is now found on temporary loan to the National Galleries museum at Duff House, near Banff, North East Scotland.

From 1575, Dunimarle Castle had a coal mine in operation run by Sir George Bruce. The mine had a tunnel that led down to the nearby Firth of Forth, which is some 30 metres below, so that the coal could be loaded onto ships. The mine was abandoned in the early 17th century and the tunnel filled in.

== Film location ==
The exterior of the castle was used as a location in the 2000 movie, The Little Vampire. The interior scenes were filmed at a property in Edinburgh.
