= Richard Crichton =

Scottish architect

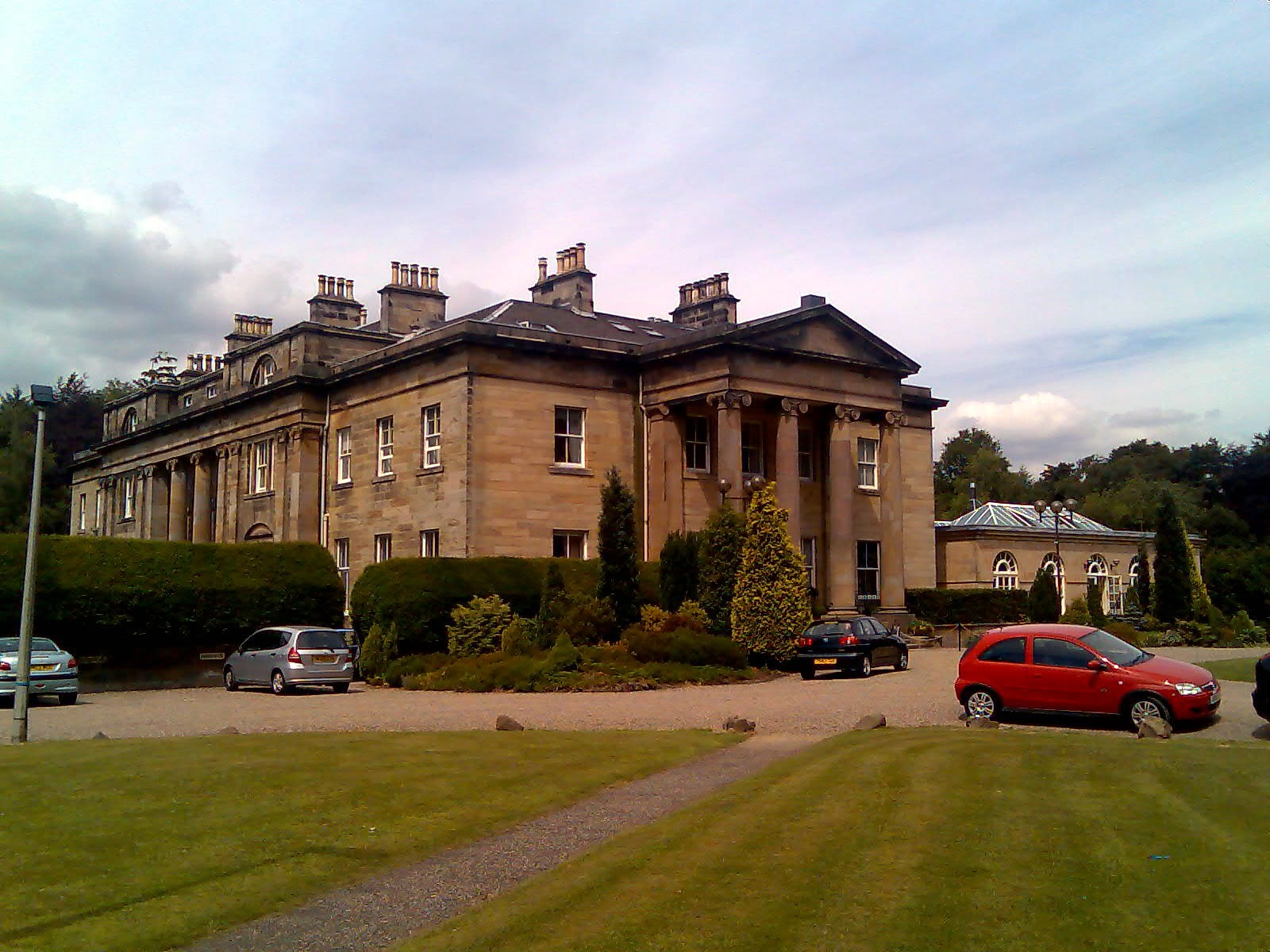
Balbirnie House

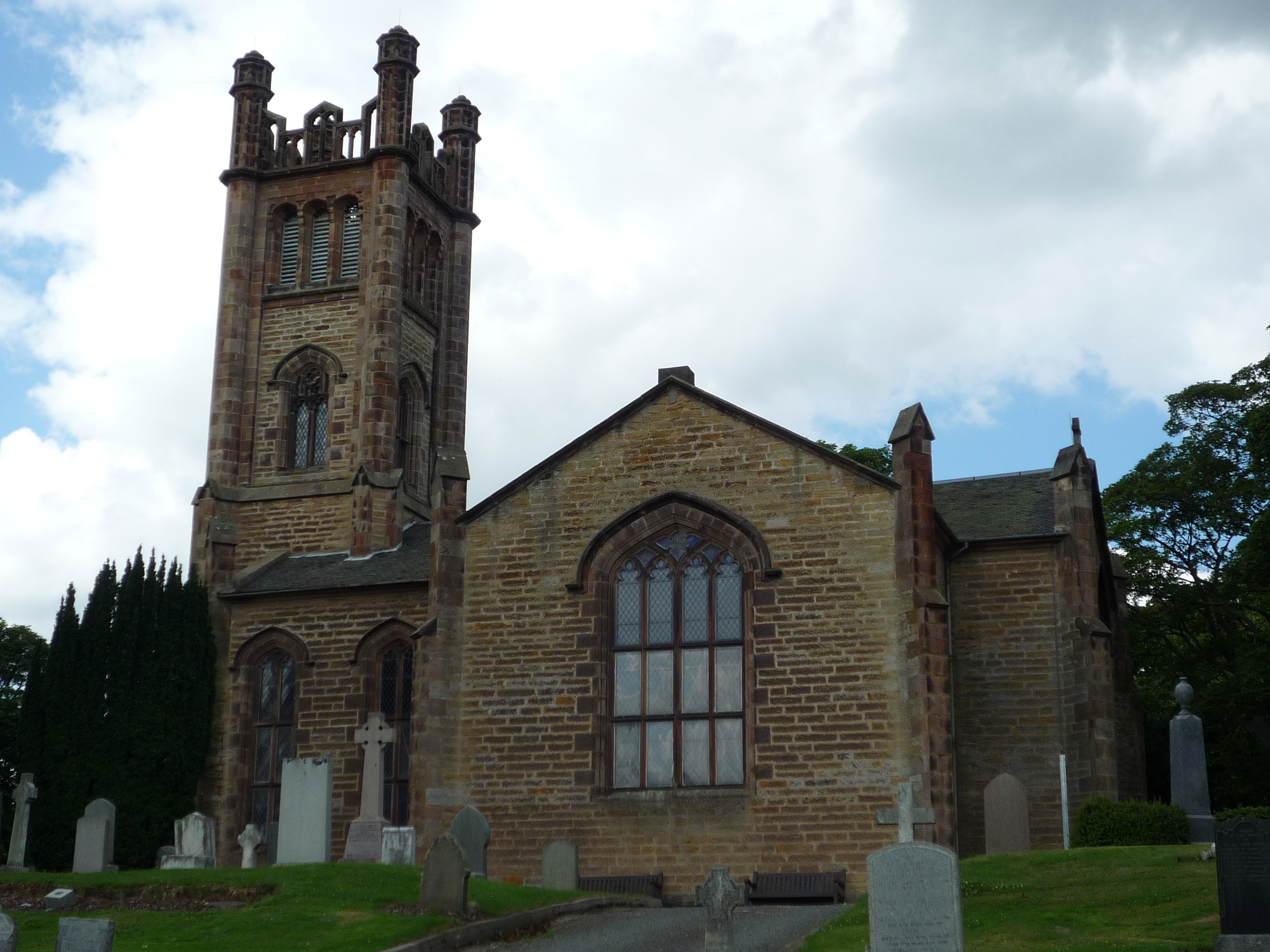
Cockpen Parish Church, 1817

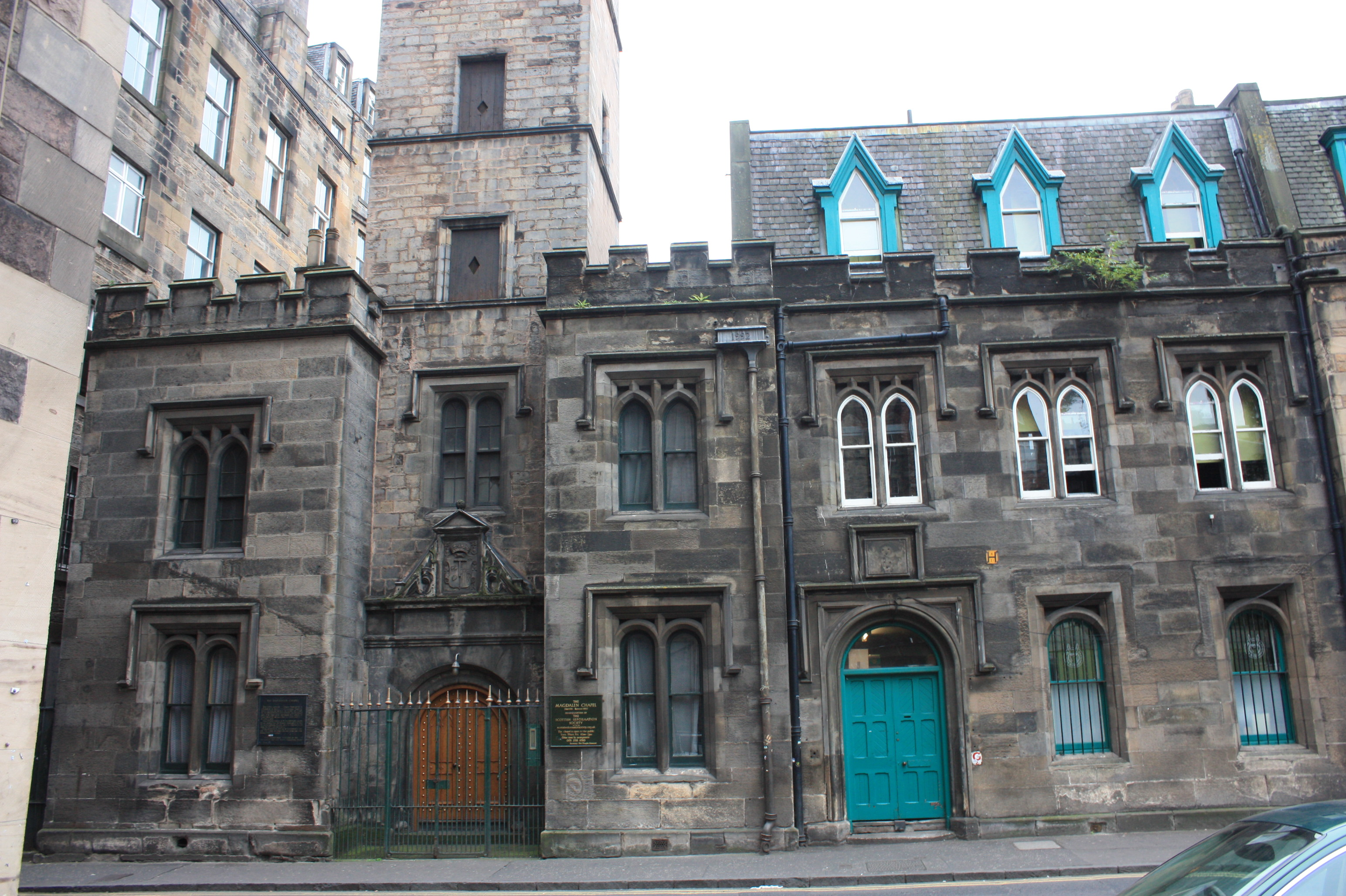
The Livingstone Memorial Institute, Cowgate, Edinburgh

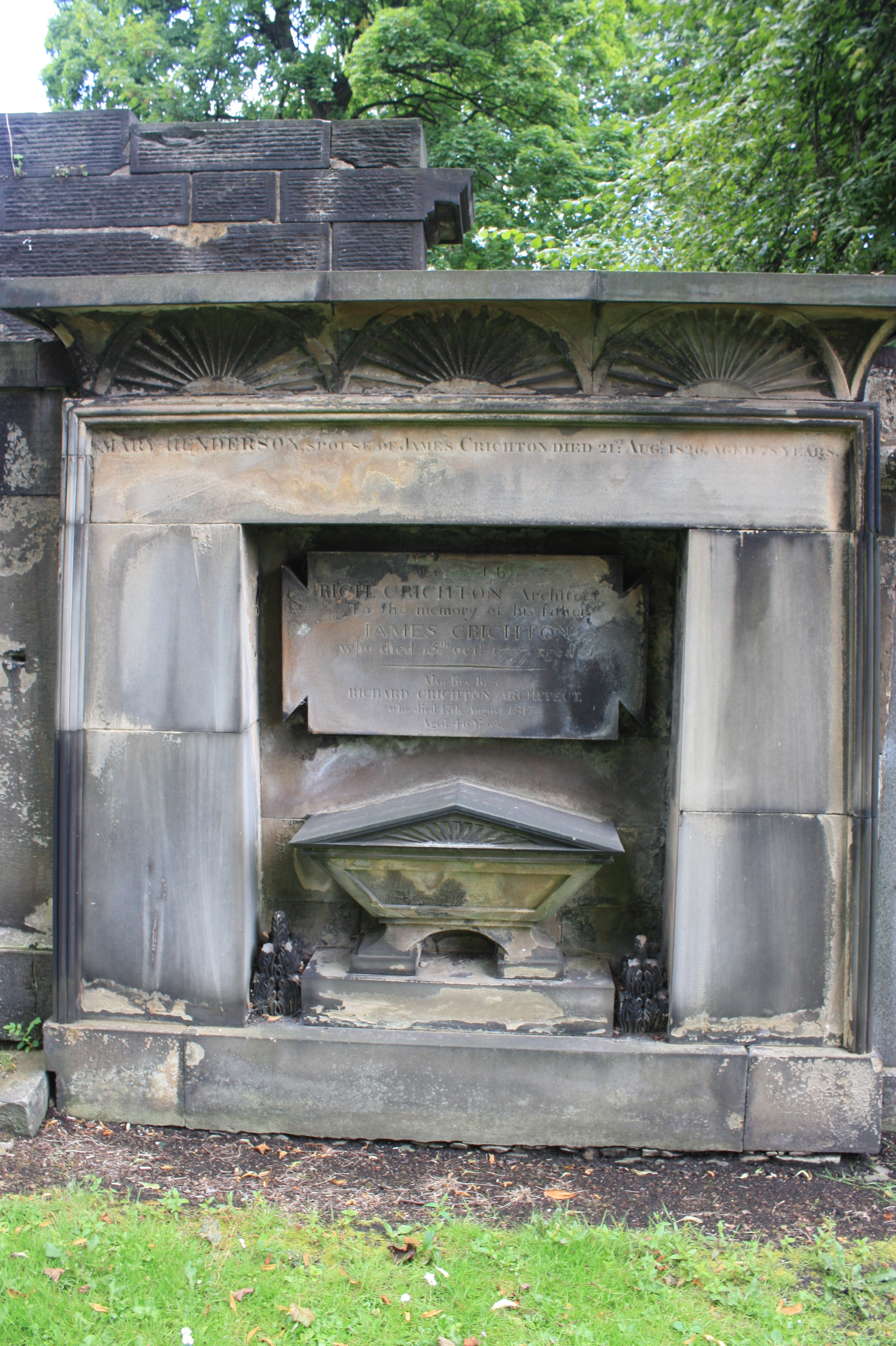
The grave of Richard Crichton, St Cuthberts churchyard, Edinburgh

Richard Crichton (died 1817) was a Scottish architect operating in the late 18th and early 19th centuries. He was described as "competent and versatile".

== Life ==
He was born around 1771, the son of James Crichton (d.1797) and Edinburgh mason. He trained under John and Robert Adam, probably the best training an architect in 18th century Britain could hope for.

In May 1797 he was appointed as a burgess in the city of Edinburgh, reflecting the public esteem with which he was viewed.

He continued the style of the Adams: a simple but very well-proportioned Classicism, occasionally venturing to the Gothic or Greek Revival styles, all with equal competence.

In 1813 he submitted a competition design for the extension of Princes Street over to Calton Hill but despite winning this (jointly with William Reid of Glasgow), the scheme was ultimately executed by Archibald Elliot.

Crichton’s career was cut short by his premature death on 17 August 1817, aged only 46.

He is buried in St Cuthberts Churchyard in Edinburgh in the grave of his parents (which is of Richard's design). The grave lies just north of the church.

His practice was continued by his nephews, and pupils, Richard and Robert Dickson who completed his several unfinished projects.

== Works ==
See

- Craig Parish Church (1796)
- Rossie Castle (1797-1800) demolished 1957
- Bank of Scotland head office, The Mound, Edinburgh (jointly with Robert Reid - 1801) later extended – unrecognisable in its original form
- Gask House, Findo Gask (1801)
- Merchiston Castle School (1801-6) later extended and remodelled
- Abercairney House, near Crieff (1805-1818) completed by R & R Dickson demolished in 1950s
- Stirling Courthouse and Jail (1806)
- Dunglass House (1807)
- Blair Drummond (1813)
- Kincardine-in-Menteith Parish Church, Blair Drummond (1814)
- Remodelling of Balbirnie House (1815)
- Remodelling of Lawers House (1815)
- Carriden Manse, near Bo’ness (1816)
- Cockpen Parish Church (1816) completed by R & R Dickson
