= Balbirnie House =

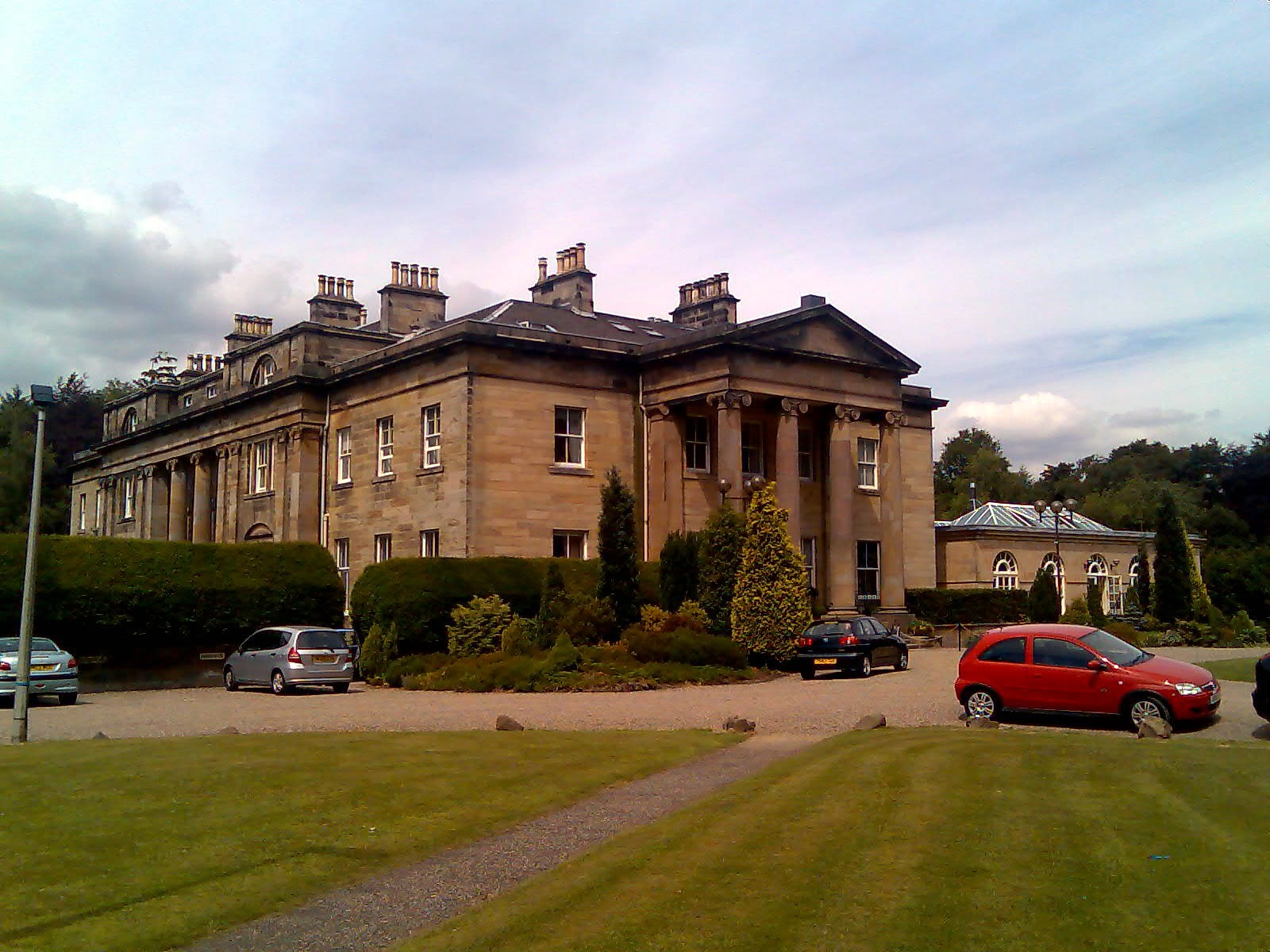
- Balbirnie House

- Location of Balbirnie House in Fife
- 56.2094°N 3.1457°W
- Location: Glenrothes, Fife, Scotland

History
- Built: 1817
- Built for: General Robert Balfour of Balbirnie

Site notes
- Architect: Richard Crichton
- Architectural style: Greek Revival

Listed Building – Category A
- Designated: 24 November 1972
- Reference no.: LB16687

Inventory of Gardens and Designed Landscapes in Scotland
- Official name: Balbirnie
- Criteria: Work of Art; Historical; Architectural
- Designated: 30 June 1987
- Reference no.: GDL00034

Balbirnie House is an early 19th-century country house in Glenrothes, in central Fife, Scotland. The present house was completed in 1817 as a rebuild of an 18th-century building, itself a replacement for a 17th-century dwelling. The home of the Balfour family from 1640, the house was sold in 1969 and opened as a hotel in 1990. The grounds now comprise a large public park and a golf course. The house is protected as a category A listed building, while the grounds are included in the Inventory of Gardens and Designed Landscapes in Scotland.

== History ==
Around 1640, the Balbirnie estate was acquired by the family of Balfour. A 17th-century house on the estate was remodelled or replaced in the later 18th century for John Balfour. The architecture of these works, completed around 1782, has been attributed to both James Nisbet and to John Baxter Jr. In 1815 further changes were begun by General Robert Balfour, to designs by the architect Richard Crichton. Some £16,000 was spent on extending the south-west front and constructing the portico at the south-east. At the same time, landscape gardener Thomas White provided plans for the improvement of the 18th-century parkland. Meanwhile, General Balfour's two brothers were developing new houses at Whittingehame in East Lothian and Newton Don in the Borders, funded by the same large inheritance. Further alterations, comprising offices, were carried out in 1860, possibly designed by David Bryce. The plant collection was expanded from the mid-19th century with seeds sent from India by George Balfour, a friend of botanist William Hooker.

The garden was remodelled in 1926 by Sir Robert Lorimer.

In 1969 the house and estate was acquired by the Glenrothes Development Corporation (GDC), who were then building the new town of Glenrothes. A golf course was laid out in the grounds, while the house was converted into offices, serving as the headquarters of the GDC. The house was later sold on to a private owner who redeveloped it as a 30-bedroom hotel, opened in 1990 by Malcolm Rifkind who was then Secretary of State for Scotland. 416 acres (168 ha) of parkland and woodland remain in the ownership of Fife Council as a public park.
