= Thomas Ludlam =

Thomas Ludlam may refer to:

- Thomas Ludlam (priest) (1727–1811), English priest, theologian and essayist
- Thomas Ludlam (colonial administrator) (1775–1810), nephew of the above and governor of Sierra Leone
