= Ludlam (surname) =

Ludlam is an English surname. Notable people with the surname include:

- Alfred Ludlam (1810–1877), British-New Zealand politician
- Charles Ludlam (1943–1987), American actor
- Jenny Ludlam (born 1951), New Zealand actress
- Lewis Ludlam (born 1995), English rugby union player
- Scott Ludlam (born 1970), Australian politician
- Steve Ludlam (born 1955), English footballer
- Thomas Ludlam (1727–1811), English clergyman
- Thomas Ludlam (1775–1810), British colonial administrator
- William Ludlam (1717–1788), English clergyman

== See also ==
- Ned Ludd, possibly born Ned Ludlam, source of the name of English nineteenth century social movement, the Luddites
