= Ludlam =

Ludlam may refer to:

== Places ==
- Mother Ludlam's Cave, Surrey, England
- Ludlam Road, a street in Miami, Florida
- Ludlam Trail, a future linear park rail trail in Miami, Florida
- Ludlam Island, an island in New Jersey
- Ludlam's Beach Light, a lighthouse in Sea Isle City, New Jersey

== Other uses ==
- Ludlam (surname)

== See also ==
- Ludlum (disambiguation)
