= William Scott, 1st Baron Stowell =

British politician

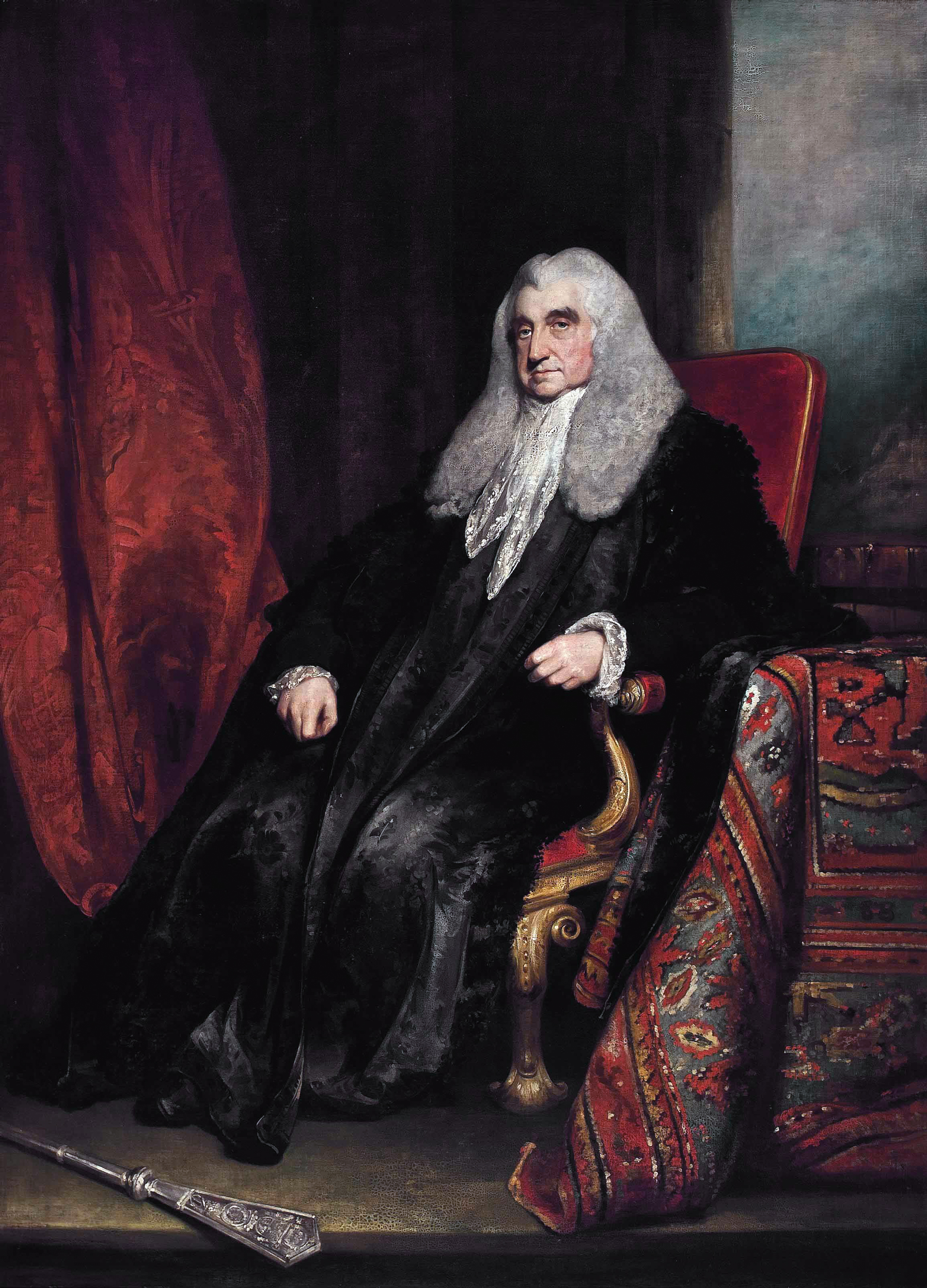
Lord Stowell. (William Owen)

William Scott, 1st Baron Stowell (17 October 1745 – 28 January 1836) was an English judge and jurist. He served as Judge of the High Court of Admiralty from 1798 to 1828.

== Background and education ==
Scott was born at Heworth, a village about four miles from Newcastle upon Tyne, the son of a tradesman engaged in the transport of coal. His younger brother John Scott became Lord Chancellor and was made Earl of Eldon. He was educated at Newcastle Royal Grammar School and Corpus Christi College, Oxford, where he gained a Durham scholarship in 1761. In 1764 he graduated and became first a probationary fellow and then as successor to William (afterwards the well known Sir William) Jones a tutor of University College. As Camden reader of ancient history he rivalled the reputation of Blackstone. Although he had joined the Middle Temple in 1762, it was not till 1776 that Scott devoted himself to a systematic study of law.

In 1783 he dined at Boyd's Inn (a.k.a. the White Horse Inn) on St Mary's Wynd with Dr Samuel Johnson on his visit to Edinburgh.

== Legal, political and judicial career ==
Scott graduated as doctor of civil law, and, after a customary year of silence, commenced practice in the ecclesiastical courts. His professional success was rapid. In 1783 he became registrar of the court of faculties, and in 1788 judge of the consistory court and advocate-general, in that year too receiving the honour of knighthood; and in 1798 he was made judge of the high court of admiralty. In this capacity he heard on appeal two important cases having to do with the abolition of the slave trade.

On 22 May 1809 HMS Crocodile took Donna Marianna on the Cape Coast for breach of the Act for the abolition of the slave trade. The Vice admiralty court at Sierra Leone condemned the vessel. Although Donna Marianna was ostensibly a Portuguese vessel, Scott upheld the seizure on the grounds that she was actually a British vessel and her Portuguese papers were a fraud.

The second case involved the French ship Le Louis (1816) after it had been seized by the West Africa Squadron for slave trading off the African coast at Cape Mesurado. HMS Queen Charlotte had originally vindicated the seizure and confiscation of the ship and cargo. However Scott overturned this judgement, saying that the way Le Lois had been stopped and boarded was illegal as "No nation can exercise a right of visitation and search on the common and unappropriated parts of the sea, save only on the belligerent claim." He accepted that this would constitute a serious impediment to the suppression of the slave trade, but argued that this should be remedied through international treaties rather than Naval officers exceeding what they were permitted to do.

He twice contested Oxford University in 1780 without success, but successfully in 1801. He also sat for Downton in 1790. He was elected a Fellow of the Royal Society in 1793.

Upon the coronation of George IV in 1821 he was raised to the peerage as Baron Stowell, of Stowell Park in the County of Gloucester, taking his title from the name of his estate. After a life of judicial service Lord Stowell retired from the bench – from the consistory court in August 1821, and from the high court of admiralty in December 1827.

== Personal life ==
Lord Stowell married twice. His first marriage, in 1781, was to Anna Maria, eldest daughter and heiress of John Bagnall of Erleigh Court, near Reading, in Berkshire, where the two later resided. They had four children, one of whom, a daughter, survived him. He married again, in 1813, the dowager Marchioness of Sligo, née Louisa Catharine Howe, younger daughter of the first and last Earl Howe of the 1788 creation, widow of John Browne, 1st Marquess of Sligo.

He died on 28 January 1836 at Erleigh Court, aged 90, and the barony became extinct.

== Sources ==
- Africa Institution (1812) Sixth Report of the Directors of the African Institution.
