= George Edmund Byron Bettesworth =

Royal Navy officer

Captain George Edmund Byron Bettesworth
- Born: 1785
- Died: 16 May 1808 (aged c23); Alvøen, Norway
- Burial place: Howick, Northumberland
- Military career
- Allegiance: Great Britain; United Kingdom
- Branch: Royal Navy
- Rank: Captain
- Units: HMS Phoebe; HMS Centaur
- Commands: HMS Curieux; HMS Crocodile; HMS Tartar
- Wars: Napoleonic Wars; Gunboat War; Battle of Alvøen

Captain George Edmund Byron Bettesworth (1785 – 16 May 1808) was a Royal Navy officer. During his service he participated in a notable single ship action.

== HMS Phoebe ==
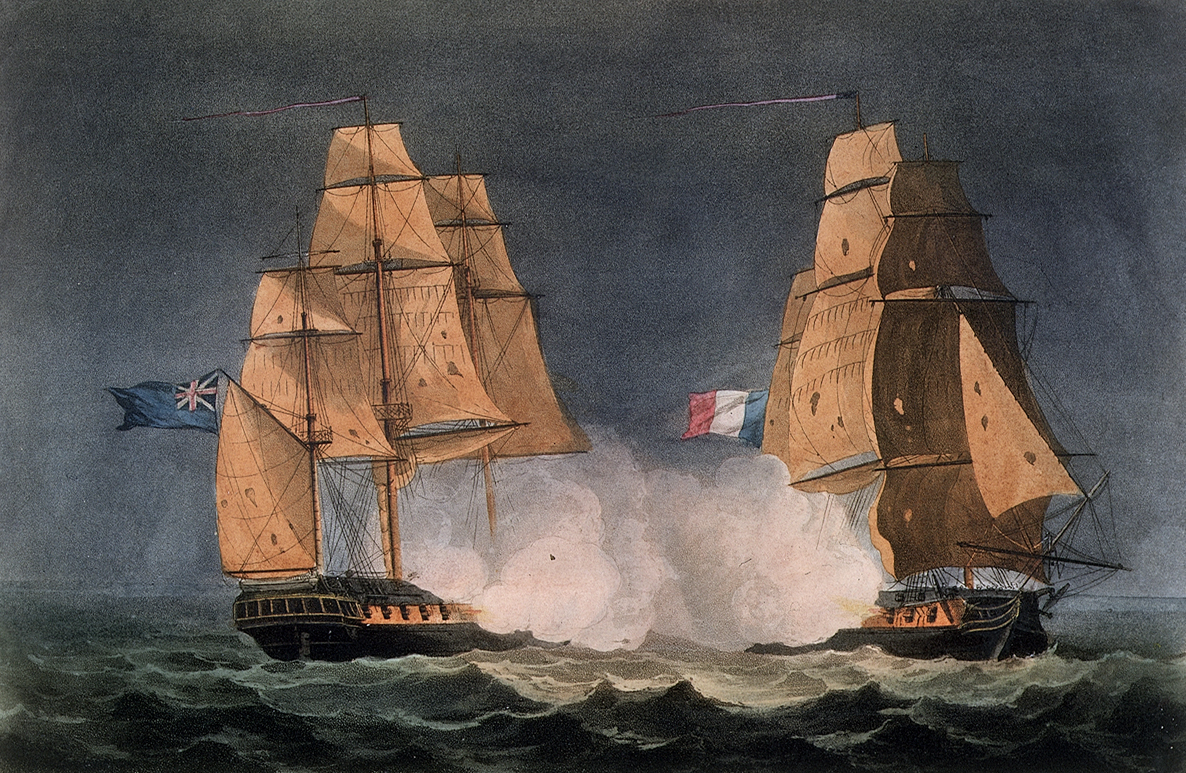
Capture of Néréide by HMS Phoebe, on 20 December 1797

At an early age he went to sea as midshipman under Captain Robert Barlow, who commanded the frigate HMS Phoebe. While with Phoebe Bettesworth participated in two notable single ship actions. On 21 December 1797 Phoebe captured the French 36-gun frigate Nérëide. Then on 19 February 1801, she captured the 38-gun Africaine, which was crowded with the 400 soldiers she was carrying to Egypt. In the battle, Phoebe had one man killed and 14 wounded. The French had some 200 men killed, and 143 wounded, many of them critically. The high casualty count was due to the soldiers remaining on deck as a point of honor, even though they could not contribute to the battle.

== HMS Centaur and HMS Curieux ==
Bettesworth remained with Phoebe until January 1804 when was he was promoted to lieutenant on HMS Centaur. On 4 February 1804 he took part in a cutting out expedition that captured the 16-gun French privateer Curieux at Fort Royal harbour, Martinique. Bettesworth received a slight wound in this engagement. The Royal Navy took Curieux into service as the sloop-of-war HMS Curieux. After her first commander, Robert Carhew Reynolds, died of the wounds he had received during her capture, Bettesworth then became her commander.

While captain of the Curieux, Bettesworth one day took her jolly boat in shore, together with the purser, who played his violin. A local black came out of the undergrowth on shore and held up a pair of fowl, indicating that he sought to sell them. Bettesworth took the bait and had his men row to the shore. The moment the boat touched the beach, a squadron of cavalry burst from the undergrowth. Their gunfire wounded Bettesworth in the thigh, causing substantial loss of blood, and broke the coxswain's arm. At Bettesworth's urging, the crew of his boat got it off the beach and rowed back to Curieux. On the way back Bettesworth wanted to open a bottle of champagne, but the purser broke it in his nervousness.

On 8 February 1805, Curieux chased the French 16-gun privateer Dame Ernouf for twelve hours before being able to bring her to action. After forty minutes of hard fighting the Frenchman, which had a larger crew than Curieux, maneuvered to attempt a boarding. Bettesworth turned with the result that the French vessel got stuck in a position where Curieux could rake her deck. Unable to fight back, the Dame Ernouff struck. Curieux suffered five killed and four wounded, including Bettesworth, whom a musket ball had hit in the head. The Frenchman had 30 killed and 40 wounded. The French recaptured Dame Ernouf shortly thereafter, but the British then recaptured her again too.

That same year (1805) he brought home from Antigua despatches from Admiral Nelson, apprising the government of Admiral Villeneuve's homeward flight from the West Indies. On the way Bettesworth spotted the French fleet and alerted the Admiralty. His information led to Rear Admiral Robert Calder's interception of the Franco-Spanish fleet at the Battle of Finisterre. For his services, Lord Barham promoted Bettesworth to Post-Captain.

== HMS Crocodile ==
In July 1806, he became captain of the 22-gun Banterer-class post ship HMS Crocodile, on the Guernsey station, and later Halifax, Nova Scotia. While with Crocodile, Bettesworth was involved in an unsuccessful claim for salvage rights to the American vessel Walker. A French privateer had captured Walker, but her crew has subsequently recaptured their ship when Crocodile came on the scene and escorted her to Halifax. For this service, Crocodile claimed salvage rights. The court did not agree.

== HMS Tartar ==
In October 1807, Bettesworth took command of the 32-gun frigate HMS Tartar. That month his cousin, the poet Lord Byron, wrote:

"Next January ... I am going to sea for four or five months with my cousin, Captain Bettesworth, who commands the Tartar, the finest frigate in the navy ... We are going probably to the Mediterranean or to the West Indies, or to the devil; and if there is a possibility of taking me to the latter, Bettesworth will do it, for he has received four-and-twenty wounds in different places, and at this moment possesses a letter from the late Lord Nelson stating that Bettesworth is the only officer in the navy who had more wounds than himself."

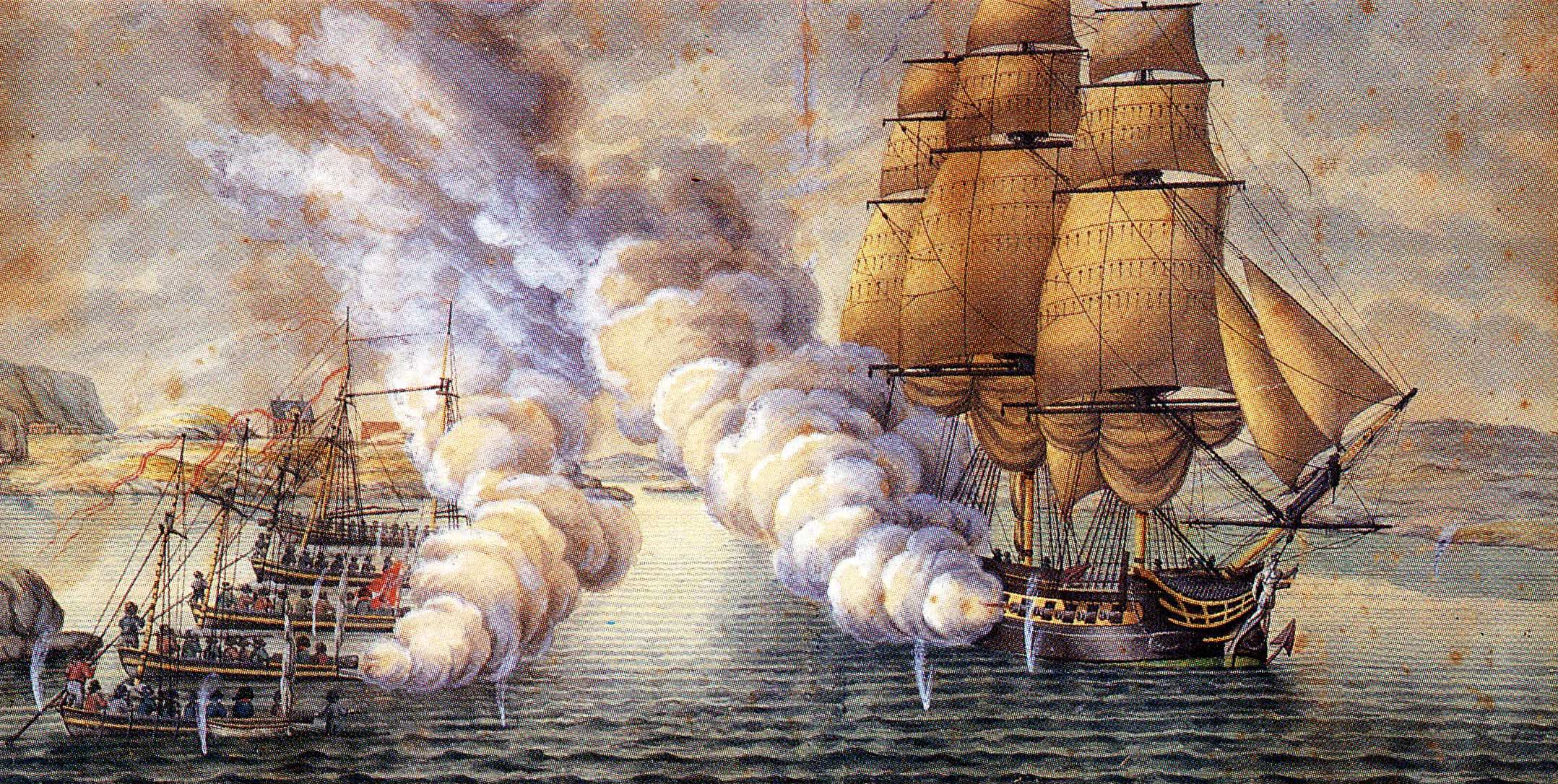
The Battle of Alvøen, in which Bettesworth was killed

The promised voyage never took place and on 16 May 1808 Bettesworth died in the Battle of Alvøen. Tartar was watching some vessels outside Bergen and decided to cut some of them off from the protecting gunboats. However, Tartar became becalmed amid the rocks, which enabled the schooner Odin and five gunboats to attack. Their first shots killed Bettesworth, and in all Tartar lost two dead and seven wounded before she could escape. Tartar did manage to sink one gunboat.

== Personal ==
Bettesworth had married Lady Hannah Althea Grey, the second daughter of General Charles Grey, 1st Earl Grey and Elizabeth Grey, on 24 August 1807, while he was captain on Crocodile. After Bettesworth's death, she married Edward Ellice, a merchant, on 30 October 1809. She died on 28 July 1832.

Betteworth's body was buried at Howick, Northumberland, in the vault of the Grey family, on 27 May 1808. Major Trevanion, "a brother of Captain Bettesworth" and probably his natural brother as he was born John Bettesworth, was chief mourner. (Byron's grandmother was a Miss Trevanion; John Bettesworth's paternal grandmother was a Trevanion, through whom he inherited the Caerhays estate.)

== Sources ==
- Brenton, Edward Pelham (1823) The naval history of Great Britain, from the year MDCCLXXXIII. to MDCCCXXXVI. (London: C. Rice).
- Rose, Hugh James, Henry John Rose, Thomas Wright (1857) A new general biographical dictionary, Volume 4. (London: T. Fellowes).
- Southey, Thomas (1827) Chronological history of the West Indies, Vol. 3. (London: Longman, Rees, Orme, Brown, and Green).
- Stewart, James, Nova Scotia. Vice-Admiralty Court (1814) Reports of cases, argued and determined in the court of vice-admiralty: at Halifax, in Nova-Scotia, from the commencement of the war, in 1803, to the end of the year 1813, in the time of Alexander Croke. (London : J. Butterworth).
- Winfield, Rif. British Warships in the Age of Sail, 1793-1817: Design, Construction, Careers and Fates. Seaforth Publishing, 2nd edition, 2008. ISBN 978-1-84415-717-4.
