= Dart (1806 ship) =

UK merchant ship, whaler, and privateer 1806–1813

History
- Launched: 1797, South America
- Captured: c.1806

United Kingdom
- Name: Dart
- Owner: Howlett (1806–1810); Thevetts (1811—1812); Boyce & Co. (1813)
- Acquired: c.1806 as purchase of a prize
- Fate: 1813 condemned as unseaworthy

General characteristics
- Type: Fully rigged ship
- Tons burthen: 189, or 191, (bm)
- Propulsion: Sail
- Complement: 30
- Armament: 1807:6 × 6-pounder guns; 1810:12 × 6&9-pounder cannons; 1811:10 × 6-pounder carronades + 2 × 9-pounder guns

Dart was a ship launched in South America under a different name. She was taken in prize circa 1806. Once under British ownership she performed one voyage as a whaler in the southern whale fishery. She then traded as a merchantman before in 1810 receiving a letter of marque. As a privateer she did something quite unusual: she made a voyage to Africa where she captured five slave ships. After this Dart returned to normal trading, this time with South America. In 1813 as she was returning to London from Buenos Aires she stopped at Pernambuco, where she was condemned as unseaworthy.

== British career ==
Dart left Britain on 6 November 1806 under the command of Captain Richard Smith, with destination the South Seas. Dart entered Lloyd's Register (LR) in 1807 with R. Smith, master, Howlett, owner, and trade London-South Seas. She returned on 13 September 1808, after having engaged in whaling and sealing off Australia.

Lloyd's Register for 1809 shows Dart's trade changing to London-New Orleans.

Captain James Wilkins received a letter of marque on 4 April 1810. LR for 1810 showed J. Wilkins replacing R. Smith as master, and Dart's trade or voyage changing from London-New Orleans to "Africa".

During her time off Sierra Leone Dart detained five slave trading vessels, all of which she sent into Freetown where the Vice admiralty court condemned them.

Date	Name	Nationality	Slaves landed
17 July 1810	San Antonio Almos	Portuguese	8
17 July 1810	Flor Deoclerim	Portuguese	8 (w/San Antonio Almos)
August 1810	Cirilla		0
4 August 1810	Hermosa Rita		77
30 December 1810	Mariana	Portuguese	10

All Dart's captures were anomalous. The court at Freetown condemned Cirilla because the slavers exhibited contempt of court and "contumaciousness". Hermosa Rita was a case of a British vessel flying a false flag (see the Donna Marianna case). However, within a day of her capture, Hermosa Rita's crew had recaptured her and were back on their way to Cuba. It took four days before the prize crew Dart had put on board was able to reassert their control. Although Mariana, Santo Antonio Almos, and Flor Deoclerim were Portuguese vessels, on 19 February 1810, under diplomatic pressure, Portugal signed a treaty of friendship and alliance that allowed British ships to police Portuguese shipping, meaning Portugal could only trade in slaves from its own African possessions. The treaty gave the court jurisdiction and the three Portuguese vessels became the first vessels it adjudicated and condemned under the treaty. Of Dart's five prizes, the court condemned all except Cirilla to the King. Dart sailed for England in May 1811 and never returned to pursuing slavers.

In 1811 Thevetts replaced Howlett as owner of Dart. The next year Crossett became master, and her trade become London–Buenos Aires.

== Fate ==
Lloyd's Register for 1813 showed Dart with a new owner, Boyce & Co., and R. Crosset, master. However, in April 1813, Lloyd's List reported that "The Dart, Crossett, from Buenos Ayres to London", had been condemned at Pernambuco as unseaworthy.
