= Battle of Alvøen =

1808 naval battle near Bergen, Norway

- Part of the Gunboat War
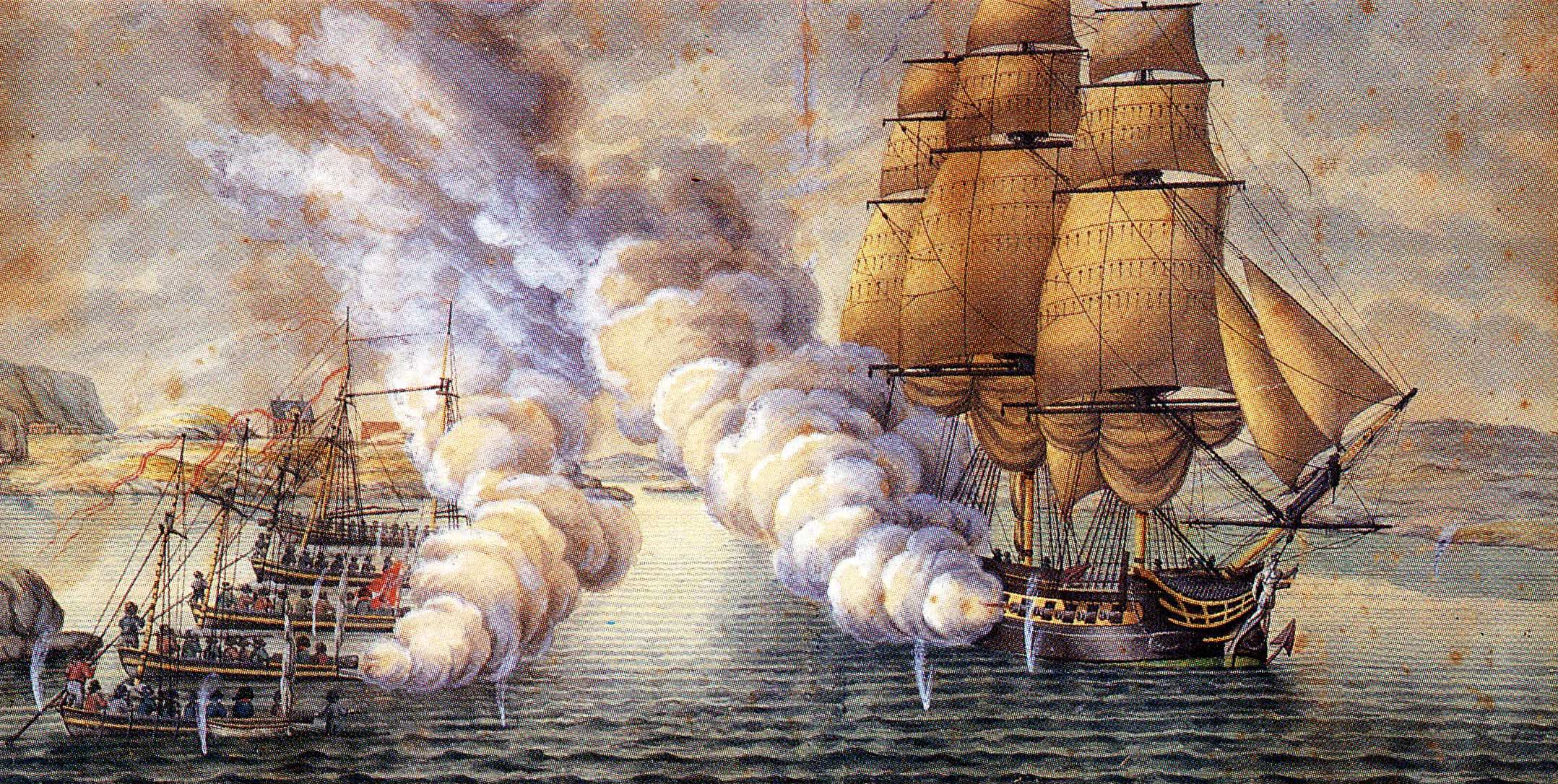
- Painting of the battle
Date	16 May 1808
Location	Off Bergen, North Sea 60°21′02″N 05°10′8″E
Result	See Aftermath

Belligerents
Denmark–Norway	United Kingdom

Commanders and leaders
Bielke	George Bettesworth †

Strength
5 gunboats	1 frigate

Casualties and losses
4 killed	2 killed 12 wounded

The Battle of Alvøen was fought on 16 May 1808 between the British frigate HMS Tartar and five Norwegian gunboats off Bergen as part of the Gunboat War. Beginning in 1807, the Royal Navy had implemented a blockade of the Norwegian coast, leading to major sociopolitical turmoil in Norway since it was dependent on imports of foodstuffs from Denmark. Having lost most of their fleet in the Battle of Copenhagen in 1807, the Danish were unable to afford the time or money to rebuild their blue-water navy of ships of the line and frigates and so had been forced to construct gunboats for coastal defence duties.

Tartar was underway to Bergen harbour in search of the Dutch privateer Gelderland, which her crew knew to be seeking shelter in the harbour during repairs. On the evening on 15 May, a message was received at Bergenhus Fortress stating that a British frigate had been sighted, and was probably heading towards Bergen. After the frigate had been sighted at Alvøen, near Bergen, on 16 May, the five gunboats making up the entire naval force in Bergen were ordered to row out and engage the British. Tartar lay becalmed outside Alvøen, and in thick fog, with the Norwegian vessels taking up a position between Bergen and the frigate and opening fire. The battle lasted about one hour, during which the British lost 2 men, including George Edmund Byron Bettesworth, the commander of the frigate. Norwegian losses were four men killed.

== Background ==
In May 1808, the Dutch navy frigate Gelderland entered Bergen harbour seeking a sheltered spot to conduct repairs. Several privateers were also present in the harbour. The Royal Navy received intelligence about the Dutch frigate, and sent the frigates Tartar, Adriane and the corvette Cygnet from Leith in Scotland on 10 May, with orders to intercept the frigate and report on its movements. On 7 May, Gelderland left Bergen; at least that is what local fishermen told Captain George Edmund Byron Bettesworth when Tartar entered the area of Stolmen west of Bergen on 15 May.

Some sources claim that Tartar was flying Dutch colours upon entering Norwegian waters on 15 May, and was therefore unsuspected, since the Netherlands were then an ally of Denmark-Norway against Britain. Norwegian fishermen and pilots sailed out in small boats to welcome the vessel and to offer their assistance as pilots – the Dutch flag might have fooled them into thinking the Tartar was Gelderland returning. The pilots would have rushed to the vessel since the first there would get the job of piloting that vessel but, upon arrival, the pilots and fishermen were taken prisoner and forced to guide the vessel in through the narrow fjords leading to Bergen. They were tried by the Norwegian authorities after the battle and a transcript of their interrogation tells of what happened next:

The defendant and the three previously mentioned Men, plus Rasmus Andersen Øvre Waage and Johannes Johannesen Søre Aarland: altogether six Men, then went out to the frigate in a small boat. -When they had come a brief distance from Shore, they sighted the pilots Jacob Jacobsen Nedre Waage and Ole Johannesen Øvre Waage or Stolmevaagen, plus the fishermen Ole Hansen Nedre Waage, Johannes Anderssen Nedre Waage, Lars Nielsen Øvre Waage and Lars Olsen Stolmevogen, also pulling for the frigate, which they boarded at about 10 am Sunday, though the defendant and his crew arrived first, although the other men tried to reach the frigate first; when they came aboard, the defendant was shown to the Captain's quarters alone, whom, via a mere seaman who spoke Norwegian, asked the defendant if he could pilot the ship into Bergen, to which the defendant answered Yes! But he also asked where the ship came from, to which the translator answered that the ship came from Dover. The seaman convinced the defendant that the ship was French, and as the defendant does not know where Dover is, he assumed what was presented to him by the translator was true.

The Chief thereafter showed the defendant a large stock of golden money lying on a plate, and told the defendant that he would be given this money by the Chief if he could take the frigate to Bergen. -

The defendant answered that he would claim no more than what the King's regulations allowed him, and then asked the ship's Draught, whereupon he received an answer. – The Chief then took the money away, and the defendant did not receive any of it.

— National Archives in Bergen, copy of court documents printed during interviews of the Norwegian pilots and fishermen conducted during 1808 and 1809: Sorenskrivaren i Sunnhordland I.A. 46, tingbok 1807-1812, fol. 86b-89b. The text is translated from old Norwegian (Danish).

Tartar sailed into what is now Marstein fyr (holmen Marsteinen). To the south, at Sotra, near Kleppe (Kleppholmen), was an optical telegraph station, part of the telegraph system along the coast. This station observed the frigate, still flying a Dutch flag and not thought to be a threat, and the station's head (carrying the signal book) and his assistant rowed out to the frigate, but were both taken prisoner, thus breaking Bergen's chain of signal stations and putting an important part of the city's defences out of action.

The Norwegians on board were eventually designated as prisoners and mostly held below decks on the Tartar, with only one or two of them kept on deck to guide the frigate into Bergen. The Tartar anchored off Bjorøyhamn on the evening of 15 May, where she was observed by inhabitants of Alvøen, and sent out four light boats to reconnoitre further in towards Bergen, find out which vessels were lying in its harbour and (last but not least) "bring out the shipping" (i.e. tempt or tow the shipping to sail out from the port and thus pass the Tartar).

== Battle ==
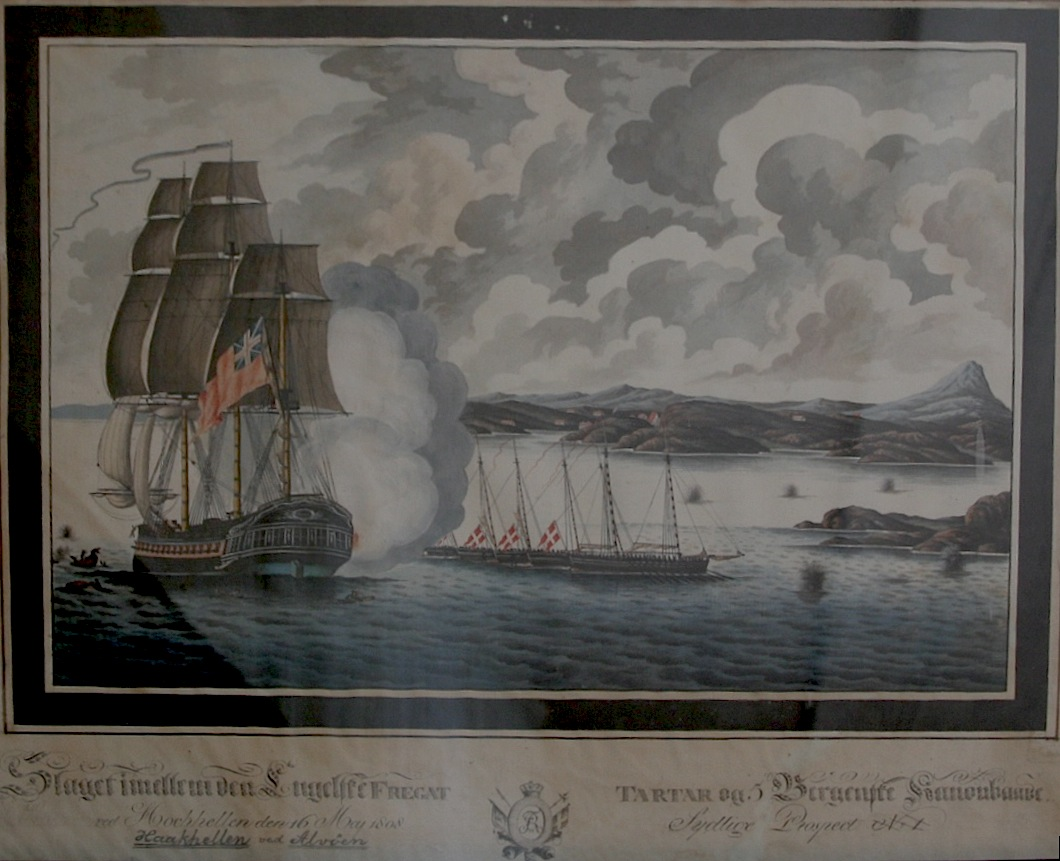
Painting of the battle

Senior lieutenant J. C. A. Bjelke, commander of the Bergen gunboat flotilla, took his five boats (one kanonchallup and four smaller kanonjoller) out on 16 May to investigate and counter the enemy frigate reported to be lying becalmed and fog-bound near Bjørø (some 13 kilometers west and south from central Bergen). Opposite (the fort of) Kvarven there was a small boat under oars retreating quickly, at which the Norwegians fired a couple of shots. As they steered for Bjørø the enemy frigate came under sail and being towed. A lively engagement of 57 minutes ensued. One of the towing vessels was hit by Bjelke's second shot, and observers on land reported seeing five holes in the hull. A breath of southerly wind forced the gunboats to retire as they continued to engage the frigate leaving Gjelte fjord. (Note: Modern spelling of this fjord is Hjeltefjorden) Damage to the gunboats involved mostly shot-away oars.

== Aftermath ==
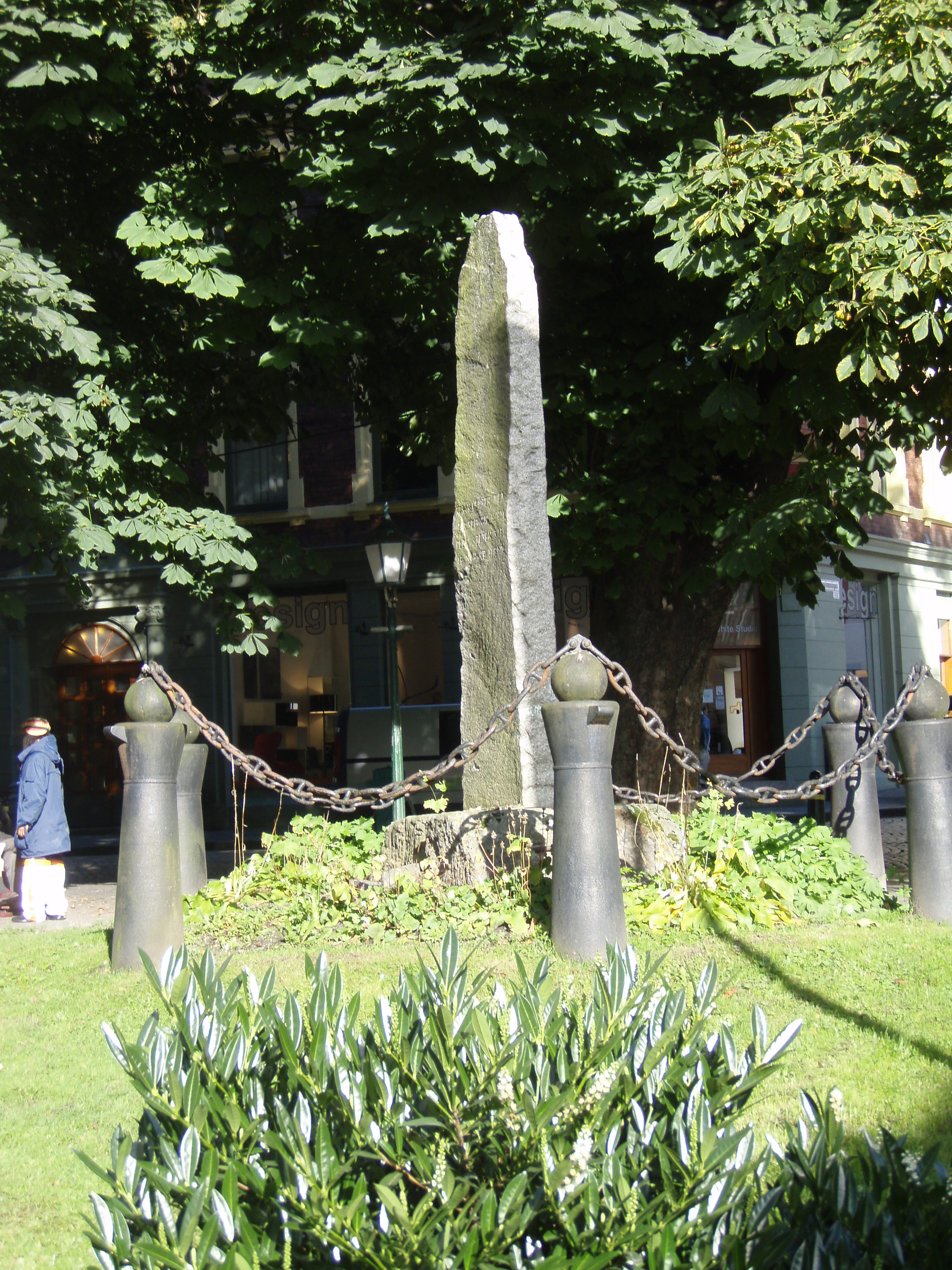
Memorial to the battle at Holy Cross Church

It appeared to some observers that Tartar was about to strike her colours, but at that moment a favourable breeze blew up, allowing the frigate to make good her escape. The Norwegian commander, Biele, claimed "If the windless wind had not come for us, I dare almost say that the frigate was now ours." Morale amongst the Norwegians rose quickly at the perceived victory in driving away Tartar, even though she had not been captured. Money for building new gunboats became readily available from public subscription. HMS Tartar was the last major British warship to enter the inner waters of Bergen, where large ships could become targets for the highly manoeuvrable smaller gunboats.

The fight had lasted only 57 minutes, each gunboat firing its weapon once every three minutes. Bielke considered this impressive, considering that the flotilla had been in training for only three weeks. The money raised from private individuals was sufficient to build three new small gunboats (kanonjoller). With this, it was enough to maintain a force in Bergen and at the same time let some vessels go in convoy service along the coast to protect the trade.

As for Tartar, she sailed back to England and was repaired there. The ship participated in several actions along the Norwegian coast after this, then with new ship commander, Joseph Baker. Tartar ran aground and sank in the Baltic Sea on 18 August 1811. The battle of the Alvøen was not a blow in the slightest to Royal Navy operations in the Baltic, but was of great importance for the British operations along the Norwegian coast during the war from 1808 to 1814, emphasising the tactical necessity of avoiding actions close inshore.

== Bibliography ==
- Fra Krigens Tid (1807 -1814) (From the wartime) edited by N A Larsen, Christiana (Oslo) 1878. (Title page and Chapter headings)
- MILITÆRT TIDSSKRIFT 1967 (Editor: Major K. V. NIELSEN) published by DEN KRIGSVIDENSKABELIGE SELSKAB, containing J. R. Hegland: Marineholmens historie. En skildring av Sjøforsvaret i Bergens Distrikt 1807–1962. (Forsvarets krigshistoriske avdeling, Oslo 1966) pages 146 – 148 (in Norwegian)
