= Letter of marque =

Governmental authorization of privateering

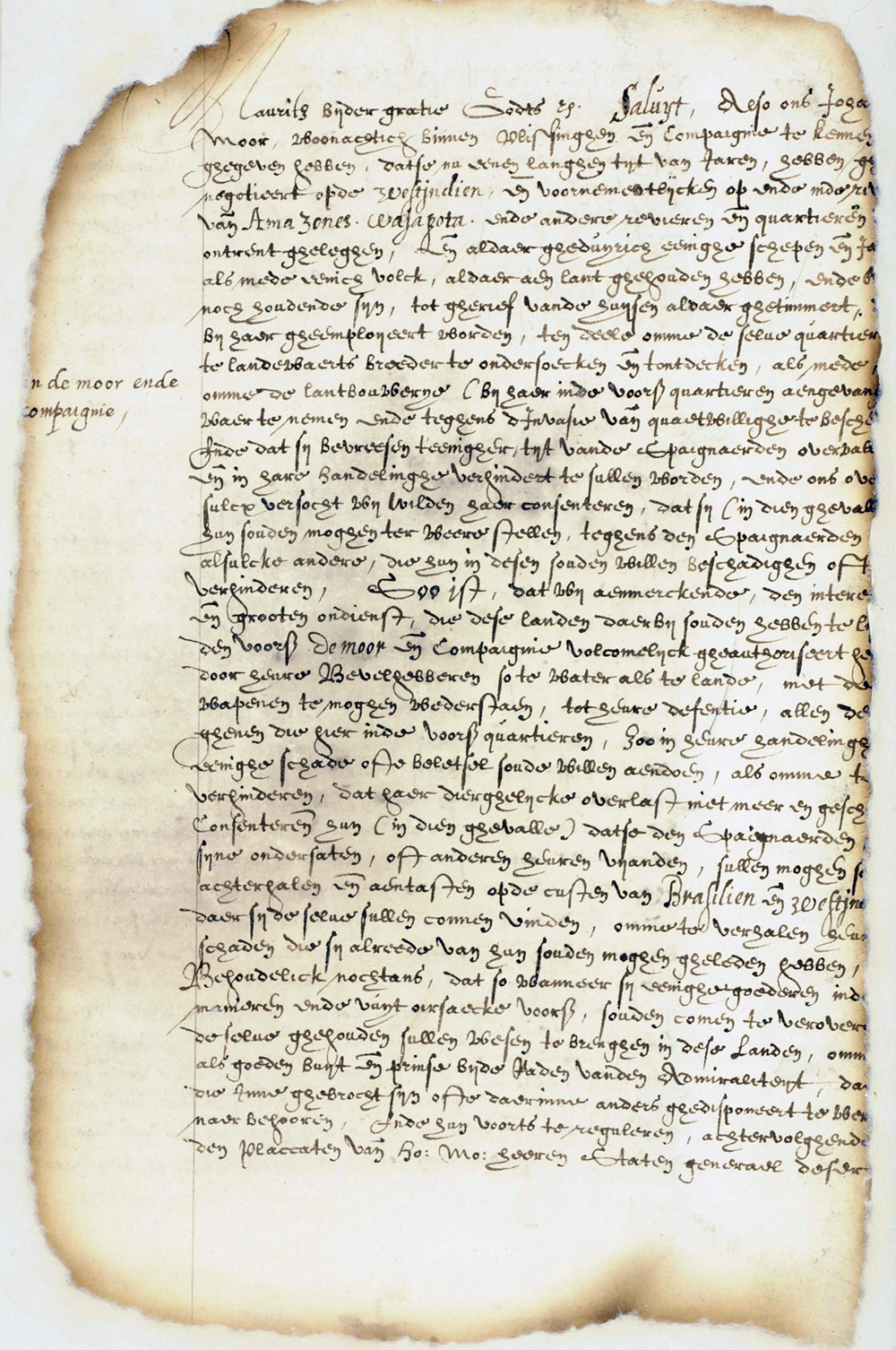
Copy of a letter of marque and reprisal issued by Maurice, Prince of Orange to Captain Johan de Moor from Vlissingen for South America, 1 June 1618, page 1

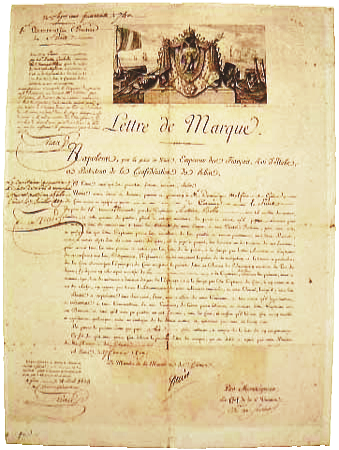
Letter of marque given to Captain Antoine Bollo via the shipowner Dominique Malfino from Genoa, owner of the Furet, a 15-tonne privateer, 27 February 1809

A letter of marque and reprisal (Note: marque is pronounced /mɑːrk/ MARK) (Note: French: lettre de marque; lettre de course) was a government license in the Age of Sail (Still technically available in the US according to US Constitution Article I, Section 8, but has not been done since the American Civil War.) which authorized a private person, known as a privateer or corsair, to attack and capture vessels of a foreign state at war with the issuer, licensing international military operations against a specified enemy as reprisal for a previous attack or injury. Captured naval prizes were judged before the government's admiralty court for condemnation and transfer of ownership to the privateer.

A common practice among Europeans from the late Middle Ages to the 19th century, cruising for enemy prizes with a letter of marque was considered an honorable calling that combined patriotism and profit. Such legally authorized privateering contrasted with unlicensed captures of random ships, known as piracy, which was universally condemned. In practice, the differences between privateers and pirates were sometimes slight, even merely a matter of interpretation.

The terms "letter of marque" and "privateer" were sometimes used to describe the ships which typically operated under the marque-and-reprisal licences. In this context, a letter of marque was a lumbering, square-rigged cargo carrier that might pick up a prize if the opportunity arose in its normal commerce. In contrast, the term privateer generally referred to a fighting vessel, fore-and-aft rigged, fast, and weatherly.

Letters of marque allowed governments to fight their wars using mercenary private captains and sailors in place of their own navies as a measure to save time and money. Instead of building, funding, and maintaining a navy in times of peace, governments would wait until the start of a war to issue letters of marque to privateers, who financed their own ships in expectation of prize money.

== Etymology and history of nomenclature ==
Marque derives from the Old English mearc, which is from the Germanic *mark-, which means boundary, or boundary marker. This is derived from the Proto-Indo-European root *merǵ-, meaning boundary, or border. The French marque is from the Provençal language marca, which is from marcar, also Provençal, meaning to seize as a pledge.

According to the Oxford English Dictionary, the first recorded use of "letters of marque and reprisal" was in an English statute in 1354 during the reign of King Edward III. The phrase referred to "a licen[c]e granted by a sovereign to a subject, authorizing him to make reprisals on the subjects of a hostile state for injuries alleged to have been done to him by the enemy's army".

== Early history ==
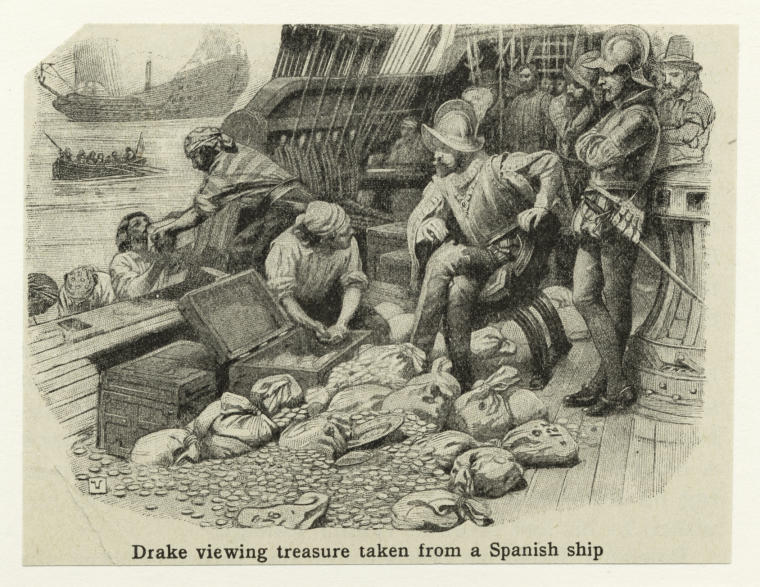
Drake viewing treasure taken from a Spanish ship, print courtesy New York Public Library

During the Middle Ages, armed private vessels enjoying their sovereign's tacit consent, if not always an explicit formal commission, regularly raided shipping of other states, as in the case of the English Sir Francis Drake's attacks on Spanish shipping. Queen Elizabeth I (despite protestations of innocence) took a share of the prizes. Dutch jurist Hugo Grotius's 1604 seminal work on international law, De Iure Praedae (Of The Law of Prize and Booty), was an advocate's brief defending Dutch raids on Spanish and Portuguese shipping.

King Henry III of England first issued what later became known as privateering commissions in 1243. These early licences were granted to specific individuals to seize the King's enemies at sea in return for splitting the proceeds between the privateers and the Crown.

The letter of marque and reprisal was documented in 1295, 50 years after wartime privateer licenses were first issued. According to Grotius, letters of marque and reprisal were akin to a "private war", a concept alien to modern sensibilities but related to an age when the ocean was lawless and all merchant vessels sailed armed for self-defense. A reprisal involved seeking the sovereign's permission to exact private retribution against some foreign prince or subject. The earliest instance of a licensed reprisal recorded in England was in the year 1295 under the reign of King Edward I. The notion of reprisal, and behind it that just war involved avenging a wrong, was associated with the letter of marque until 1620 in England. To apply for such a letter, a shipowner had to submit to the Admiralty Court an estimate of actual losses incurred.

Licensing privateers during wartime became widespread in Europe by the 16th century, when most countries began to enact laws regulating the granting of letters of marque and reprisal. Such business could be very profitable; during the eight years of the American Revolutionary War, ships from the tiny island of Guernsey carrying letter of marque captured French and American vessels to the value of £900,000 (equivalent to £125,702,134 in 2025). Privateers from Guernsey continued to operate during the Napoleonic Wars.

Although privateering commissions and letters of marque were originally distinct legal concepts, such distinctions became purely technical by the 18th century. Article I of the United States Constitution, for instance, states that "The Congress shall have Power To ... grant Letters of marque and reprisal ...", without separately addressing privateer commissions.

During the American War of Independence, the Napoleonic Wars, and the War of 1812, it was common to distinguish verbally between privateers (also known as private ships of war) on the one hand, and armed merchantmen, which were referred to as "letters of marque", on the other, though both received the same commission. The Sir John Sherbrooke (Halifax) was a privateer; the Sir John Sherbrooke (Saint John) was an armed merchantman. The East India Company arranged for letters of marque for its East Indiamen ships, such as the Lord Nelson. They did not need permission to carry cannons to fend off warships, privateers, and pirates on their voyages to India and China but, the letters of marque provided that, should they have the opportunity to take a prize, they could do so without being guilty of piracy. Similarly, the Earl of Mornington, an East India Company packet ship of only six guns, also carried a letter of marque.

Letters of marque and privateers are largely credited for the age of Elizabethan exploration, because privateers were used to explore the seas. Under the Crown, Sir Francis Drake, Sir Walter Raleigh, and Sir Martin Frobisher sailed the seas as privateers; their expedition reports helped shape the age of Elizabethan exploration.

In July 1793, the East Indiamen Royal Charlotte, Triton, and Warley participated in the capture of Pondichéry by maintaining a blockade of the port. Afterwards, while sailing to China, the same three East Indiamen participated in an action in the Straits of Malacca. They came upon a French frigate, with some six or seven British prizes, with a crew replenishing her water casks ashore. The three British vessels immediately gave chase. The frigate fled towards the Sunda Strait. The Indiamen were able to catch up with a number of the prizes, and, after a few cannon shots, were able to retake them. Had they not carried letters of marque, such behaviour might well have qualified as piracy. Similarly, on 10 November 1800, the East Indiaman Phoenix captured the French privateer General Malartic, under Jean-Marie Dutertre, an action made legal by a letter of marque. Additionally, vessels with a letter of marque were exempt from having to sail in convoy, and nominally their crew members were exempt, during a voyage, from impressment.

During the Napoleonic Wars, the Dart and Kitty, British privateers, spent some months off the coast of Sierra Leone hunting slave-trading vessels.

== Applying for, and legal effect of, a letter of marque ==
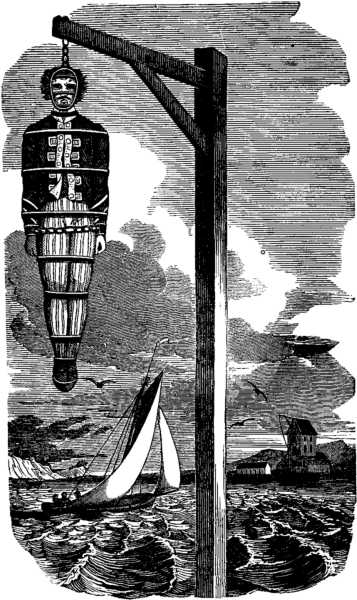
The body of Captain William Kidd hanging in a gibbet over the Thames, the result of confusion over whether Captain Kidd took prizes legally under a letter of marque, or illegally as a pirate.

The procedure for issuing letters of marque, and the issuing authority, varied by time and circumstance. In colonial British America, for instance, colonial governors issued such letters in the name of the Crown. During the American War of Independence, authorization shifted from individual state legislatures, followed by both the states and the Continental Congress, and lastly, after ratification of the Constitution, only Congress authorized and the President signed letters of marque. A shipowner applied for such a letter of marque by stating the name, description, tonnage, force (armaments) of the vessel, name and residence of the owner, and intended number of crew. The shipowner tendered a bond promising strict observance of the country's laws and treaties, and of international laws and customs. The United States granted the commission to the vessel, not to its captain, often for a limited time or specified area, and stated the enemy upon whom attacks were permitted. For example, during the Second Barbary War (1815), President James Madison authorized the brig Grand Turk (out of Salem, Massachusetts) to cruise against "Algerine vessels, public or private, goods and effects, of or belonging to the Dey of Algiers". This particular commission was never put to use, as it was issued July 3, 1815, the same day the treaty was signed, ending the U.S. involvement in the war.

In Britain in the 18th century, the High Court of Admiralty issued Letters of Marque. It was customary for the proposed privateer to pay a deposit or bond, possibly £1,500 (equivalent to £266,447 in 2025) as surety for good behaviour. The details of the ship, including tonnage, crew and weapons were recorded. The ownership of these ships was often split into 1/8 shares. Prizes were assessed and valued with profits split in pre-agreed proportions among the government, the owners, and the captain and crew.

A letter of marque and reprisal in effect converted a private merchant vessel into a naval auxiliary. A commissioned privateer enjoyed the protection and was subject to the obligations of the laws of war. If captured, the crew was entitled to honorable treatment as prisoners of war, while without the licence they were deemed mere pirates "at war with all the world," criminals who were properly hanged.

For this reason, enterprising maritime raiders commonly took advantage of "flag of convenience" letters of marque, shopping for cooperative governments to license and legitimize their depredations. French/Irishman Captain Luke Ryan and his lieutenants in just over two years commanded six vessels under the flags of three different countries and on opposite sides in the same war. Likewise the Lafitte brothers in New Orleans cruised under letters of marque secured by bribery from corrupt officials of tenuous Central American governments, to cloak plunder with a thin veil of legality.

== Adjudicating captures, invalid letters of marque, or illegal cruelty ==
The letter of marque by its terms required privateers to bring captured vessels and their cargoes before admiralty courts of their own or allied countries for condemnation. Applying the rules and customs of prize law, the courts decided whether the letter of marque was valid and current, and whether the captured vessel or its cargo in fact belonged to the enemy (not always easy, when flying false flags was common practice), and if so the prize and its cargo were "condemned", to be sold at auction with the proceeds divided among the privateer's owner and crew. A prize court's formal condemnation was required to transfer title; otherwise the vessel's previous owners might well reclaim her on her next voyage, and seek damages for the confiscated cargo.

Questions sometimes arose as to the legitimacy of a letter of marque, especially in cases of disputed sovereignty during civil wars or rebellions. Following the deposition of James II of England, for instance, the new Privy Council of England did not recognize the letters of marque issued by James while in exile in France, and prosecuted captured sailors operating under them as pirates.

During the American Civil War, Union authorities likewise attempted to prosecute Confederate privateers for the criminal act of piracy. When the Confederate privateer Savannah was captured in 1861, its crew was put on trial in New York. The Confederate government, however, threatened to execute captured Union soldiers in retaliation if any of the Confederate sailors were convicted and hanged, and the Union eventually agreed to treat Confederate privateers as prisoners of war.

Privateers were also required by the terms of their letters of marque to obey the laws of war, honour treaty obligations (avoid attacking neutrals), and in particular to treat captives as courteously and kindly as they safely could. If they failed to live up to their obligations, the admiralty courts could – and did – revoke the letter of marque, refuse to award prize money, forfeit bonds, or even award tort (personal injury) damages against the privateer's officers and crew.

== Abolition of privateering ==
States often agreed by treaty to forgo privateering between them, as England and France repeatedly did starting with the diplomatic overtures of Edward III in 1324; privateering nonetheless recurred in every war between them for the next 500 years.

Benjamin Franklin had attempted to persuade the French to lead by example and stop issuing letters of marque to their corsairs, but the effort floundered when war loomed with Britain once again. The French Convention did forbid the practice, but it was reinstated after the Thermidorian Reaction, in August 1795; on 26 September 1797, the Ministry of the Navy was authorized to sell small ships to private parties for this purpose.

Finally, after the Congress of Paris at the end of the Crimean War, seven European states signed the Paris Declaration of 1856 renouncing privateering, and 45 more countries eventually joined them, which in effect abolished privateering worldwide. The United States was among a few countries that were not signatory to that declaration.

When the War of the Pacific started in 1879 Bolivia did not possess any ships, but on March 26, 1879, Bolivian President Hilarion Daza formally offered letters of marque to any ships willing to go to combat for Bolivia. Bolivia had not signed the Paris Declaration Respecting Maritime Law but the United States, Britain and France stood by the treaty and refused to accept the legality of Bolivia's act. Since Bolivia did not have any ports because Chile had occupied them, and because Peru discouraged the use of Letters of Marque, the naval conflict was left to be resolved between Chile and Peru.

== 20th century ==
In December 1941 and the first months of 1942, Goodyear commercial L-class blimp Resolute operating out of Moffett Field in Sunnyvale, California, flew anti-submarine patrols. As the civilian crew was armed with a rifle, a persistent misconception arose that this made the ship a privateer and that she and sister commercial blimps were operated under letters of marque until the Navy took over operation. Without Congressional authorization, the Navy would not have been able to legally issue any letters of marque.

== 21st-century American reconsideration of letters of marque ==
Article I of the United States Constitution lists issuing letters of marque and reprisal in Section 8 as one of the enumerated powers of Congress, alongside the power to tax and to declare war. However, since the American Civil War, the United States as a matter of policy has consistently followed the terms of the 1856 Paris Declaration forbidding the practice. The United States has not legally commissioned any privateers since 1815, although the status of submarine-hunting Goodyear airships in the early days of World War II created significant confusion. Various accounts refer to airships Resolute and Volunteer as operating under a "privateer status", but Congress never authorized a commission, nor did the President sign one.

The issue of marque and reprisal was raised before Congress after the September 11 attacks and again by Congressman Ron Paul on July 21, 2007. The attacks were defined as acts of "air piracy" and the Marque and Reprisal Act of 2001 was introduced, which would have granted the president the authority to use letters of marque and reprisal against the specific terrorists, instead of warring against a foreign state. The terrorists were compared to pirates in that they are difficult to fight by traditional military means. On April 15, 2009, Paul also advocated the use of letters of marque to address the issue of Somali pirates operating in the Gulf of Aden. However, the bills Paul introduced were not enacted into law.

During the 2022 Russian invasion of Ukraine, a bill was introduced in the United States Congress to "[authorize] the President to issue letters of marque and reprisal" in order to seize yachts owned by Russian oligarchs.

US Senator Mike Lee and others have suggested consideration be given to the potential use of letters of marque and reprisal in efforts to curtail the presence of Mexican cartels. On December 18, 2025 Lee introduced S.3567, a bill which would authorise the issuance of letters of marque against members of cartels.

== See also ==
- Commerce raiding
- Confederate privateer
- Hired armed vessels
- No purchase, no pay
- Prize (law)
- Punitive expedition
- Reprisal
- Jean Bart
- Blackbeard
- Enos Collins
- Miguel Enríquez
- René Duguay-Trouin
- Ambroise Louis Garneray
- Alexander Godfrey
- Jean Lafitte
- Pierre Lafitte
- Henry Morgan
- Robert Surcouf
- Joseph Potier
- Amaro Pargo
