= William Ludlam =

English clergyman and mathematician

William Ludlam (1717–1788) was an English clergyman and mathematician.

== Life ==
Born at Leicester, he was elder son of the physician Richard Ludlam (1680–1728), who practised there; Thomas Ludlam, the clergyman, was his youngest brother. (His son was also called Thomas Ludlam, see below.) His mother was Anne, daughter of William Drury of Nottingham. His uncle, Sir George Ludlam, was Chamberlain of the city of London, and died in 1726. One of his sisters became stepmother of Joseph Cradock, and one of his first cousins, Isabella, daughter of John Ludlam, married Gerrard Andrewes, and was mother of Gerrard Andrewes the dean of Canterbury.

Ludlam, after attending Leicester grammar school, became scholar of St. John's College, Cambridge, and was elected to a fellowship in 1744. He matriculated in 1734 and graduated B.A. 1738, M.A. 1742, and B.D. 1749. In 1749 he was instituted to the vicarage of Norton-by-Galby in Leicestershire, on the nomination of Bernard Whalley. From 1754 to 1757 he was junior dean of his college, and from 1767 to 1769 he was Linacre lecturer in physic.

In 1760 Ludlam unsuccessfully contested the Lucasian chair of mathematics with Edward Waring. This was despite the negative campaigning of William Samuel Powell, who attacked Waring's work. In 1765 Ludlam was one of "three gentlemen skilled in mechanics" appointed to report to the Board of Longitude on the merits of John Harrison's watch; His report is given in the Gentleman's Magazine, 1765, pt. i. p. 412. He enjoyed a reputation at the time for his skill in practical mechanics and astronomy, as well as for his mathematical lectures.

In 1768, having accepted from his college the rectory of Cockfield in Suffolk, thereby vacating his fellowship, Ludlam removed to Leicester, where he spent the remaining twenty years of his life. At first he lived with his brother Thomas in Wigston's Hospital, but in 1772 he married. In 1773 he was elected a member of the American Philosophical Society. He appears in the Life of Thomas Robinson (1749–1813) by Edward Thomas Vaughan, who was then vicar of St. Mary's, Leicester.

Memorial tablet, St Mary de Castro, Leicester

In Memory of William Ludlam, B.D.
many years fellow of St. John's college, Cambridge,
(son of Richard Ludlam, M. B.)
who died March 16, 1788, aged 71 years.
And of William, his son, aged 3 years.

Ludlam died on 16 March 1788, and was commemorated in a tablet on the south wall of St. Mary's. Due to later alterations, the tablet is no longer in the church. However, there is a memorial, high up on a wall, to his son, Thomas Ludlam (1775–1810), placed there by William Ludlam's widow, Frances.

The Gentleman's Magazine (1788, pt. i. p. 461) reported the sale by auction of his instruments and models.

== Works ==
Ludlam may have contributed in early life to the Monthly Review, but most of his writings were in his time at Leicester. His Rudiments of Mathematics (1785) became a standard Cambridge text-book, passed through several editions, and was still in vogue in 1815. In Essay on Newton's Second Law of Motion (1780), Ludlam suggested an explicit statement of the physical independence of forces. It was rejected by the Royal. It was noticed in the issue of the Monthly Review for November, 1780, Art. 32. p. 390 (the notice comes after the usual digest of the Royal's Philosophical Transactions) and reprinted as the third essay in the second edition of Mathematical Essays (1787). Other publications were:

- Astronomical Observations made in St. John's College, 1767 and 1768, with an Account of Several Astronomical Instruments, 1769.
- Two Mathematical Essays; the first on Ultimate Ratios, the second on the Power of the Wedge, 1770.
- Directions for the Use of Hadley's Quadrant, with Remarks on the Construction of that Instrument, 1771.
- The Theory of Hadley's Quadrant, or Rules for the Construction and Use of that Instrument demonstrated, 1771.
- An Introduction to and Notes on Mr. Bird's Method of Dividing Astronomical Instruments, 1786.
- Mathematical Essays on (i.) Properties of the Cycloid, (ii.) Def. i.; Cor. i. Prop. x.; Cor. i. Prop. xiii. of Book I. of Newton's Principia, 1787.

Ludlam contributed to the Gentleman's Magazine in 1772 (pt. i. p. 562) "A Short Account of Church Organs." There are also some papers in the Royal's Philosophical Transactions of the Royal Society appear papers by him. (Note: Account of a New-constructed Balance for the Woollen Manufacture (lv. 205), 1765; Principal Properties of the Engine for Turning Ovals in Wood or Metal and Drawing Ovals on Paper (lxx. 378), 1780; Observations on the Transit of Venus and Eclipse of the Sun at Leicester, June 1769 (lix. 236); Occultation of ζ Tauri (lx. 355), 1770; Determination of Latitude of Leicester (lxv. 366), 1775; Eclipse of the Sun at Leicester, 1778 (lxviii. 1019).) He was also the author of Four Theological Essays on the Scripture Metaphors and other Subjects, 1787, and Two Essays on Justification and the Influence of the Holy Spirit, 1788. These essays, with four others by him, are published in Essays, Scriptural, Moral, and Logical, by W. and T. Ludlam, 2 vols. 1807. In the two essays which were issued in the year of his death appear strictures on certain passages in Joseph Milner's Tract in Answer to Gibbon. Joseph Milner's brother Isaac Milner replied after Ludlam was dead in the preface to an edition of Joseph Milner's sermons, 1801 (ci, cii), and handled Ludlam severely. He was answered in a second edition of the Essays, 1809.

== Family ==
William Ludlam married Frances Dowley on 13 March 1773 in Leicester.

Of a numerous family only two sons survived Ludlam; of these the elder, Thomas Ludlam (1775–1810), after serving an apprenticeship to a printer, entered the service of the Sierra Leone Company, and going out to the colony became a member of the council, and twice governor for the company. He was, further, acting governor for the company from November 1805 until 1 January 1808 when the company's rights were ceded to the British government and governor of the crown colony until 27 July 1808. Subsequently he was commissioned to explore the neighbouring coast of Africa. He died on board HMS Crocodile frigate at Sierra Leone, 25 July 1810.

== Sources ==
- This article incorporates text from a publication now in the public domain: Platts, Charles (1893). "Ludlam, William". In Lee, Sidney (ed.). Dictionary of National Biography. Vol. 34. London: Smith, Elder & Co.
- Platts, Charles, "Ludlam, William (bap. 1717, d. 1788), mathematician and writer on theology." Oxford Dictionary of National Biography, 2004. Accessed 14 Aug. 2018.
- Richard Decesare (2011), "William Ludlam: portrait of an 18th century mathematician", BSHM Bulletin 26(2):105–17.
