= Ludlum =

Ludlum may refer to:

- Ludlum Measurements, an American manufacturer of radiation detection and monitoring equipment

== People ==
- David M. Ludlum (1910–1997), American historian, meteorologist, entrepreneur, and author
- Robert Ludlum (1927–2001), American author of 27 thriller novels
- Alia Moses (previously Alia Moses Ludlum; born 1962), District Judge of the United States District Court for the Western District of Texas
