= Donna Marianna (1809 ship) =

History

United Kingdom
- Owner: 1809:Samuel Macdowall & Co

Donna Marianna (or Donna Mariana) was a vessel that left Liverpool in 1809. On 22 May 1810 HMS Crocodile seized Donna Marianna for breach of the Act for the abolition of the Slave Trade. The Vice admiralty court at Freetown, Sierra Leone, condemned Donna Marianna and her owners appealed the decision. The result of the appeal was a finding against the owners in a case that became an important milestone in the suppression of the slave trade.

After the passage of the Act abolishing the slave trade, some British merchants attempted illicitly to continue their involvement in the trade. A number of Liverpool merchants initially engaged in subterfuge, selling their vessels to nominal owners in other European and American countries where the slave trade remained legal. The case of Donna Marianna established the precedent that British warships could detain, and British Vice-Admiralty Courts could condemn vessels under foreign flags and their cargo where British ownership could be proved.

== Facts of the case ==
Donna Marianna was the American vessel Orion, which Samuel Macdowall & Co. of Liverpool purchased in 1809. They appointed a man named Vauralst as master, and sent her to Madeira with a cargo of culm. From Madeira she sailed to Pernambuco with a cargo of wine. There she was said to have been sold to a Portuguese merchant by the name of Da Silva.

From Pernambuco Donna Marianna sailed to Bahia under the Portuguese flag, carrying a cargo of wine of unspecified origin. From Bahia she sailed to the Cape Coast, having first taken on board "a variety of goods assorted for the Slave Trade". For this voyage she was under the command of Captain DaSouza, though Vauralst continued on board as supercargo.

On 22 May 1809 Crocodile seized Donna Marianna for breach of the Act for the abolition of the slave trade and sent her into Sierra Leone. The Vice admiralty court at Sierra Leone condemned the vessel and cargo on 6 July 1810, though there is no evidence that there were any slaves aboard her.

Key evidence was the documents found in a passenger's trunk that showed that her fitting out for the slave trade had taken place at Liverpool.

== Judgement on appeal ==
The owners appealed, arguing that Donna Marianna was a Portuguese vessel and that therefore she and her cargo were not subject to British law.

Judge William Scott presided over the appeal. On 3 June 1812 he upheld the seizure of Donna Marianna on the grounds that she was a "British vessel, and that this Portuguese disguise has been assumed for the mere purpose of protecting the property of British merchants in a traffic which it was not lawful for them to engage in."

On 6 June 1812 Scott upheld the seizure of the cargo. He stated, "I consider the whole interest of the adventure to reside in the British merchants, and that De Silva is lending his name and agency to further a deception on British laws. I therefore see no reason the cargo should not follow the fate of the ship, with which it is involved in one common fraud."

== The captors' reward ==
In November 1814, the captain and crew of Crocodile received a moiety of the proceeds of the seizure. A first-class share of the distribution, that of Crocodile's captain, was worth £443 17s 0d; a seaman's share was worth £1 15s 9d.
