= Alvøen =

Manor house in Bergen, Norway

Coordinates: 60°21′N 5°11′E

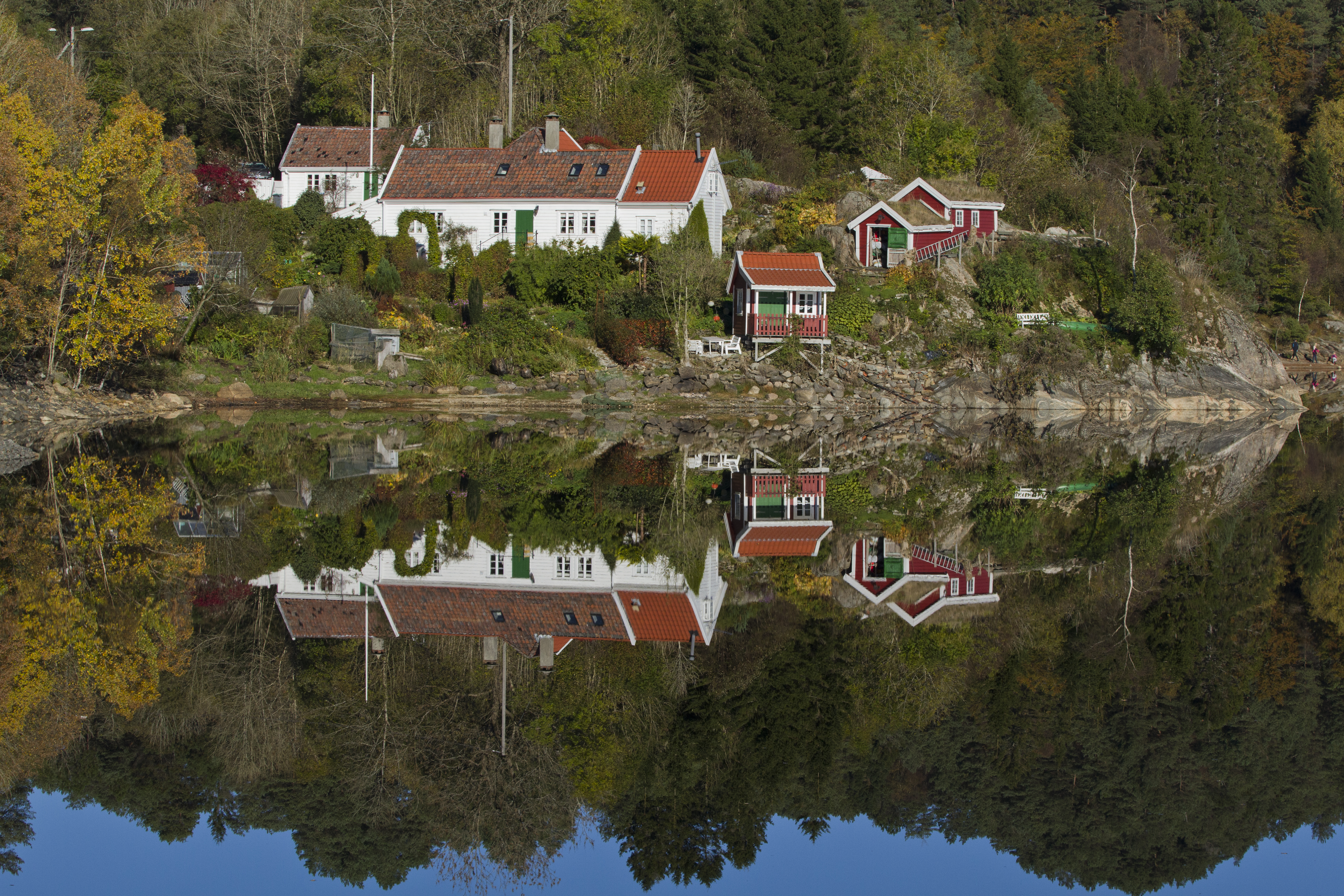
Alvøen Manor

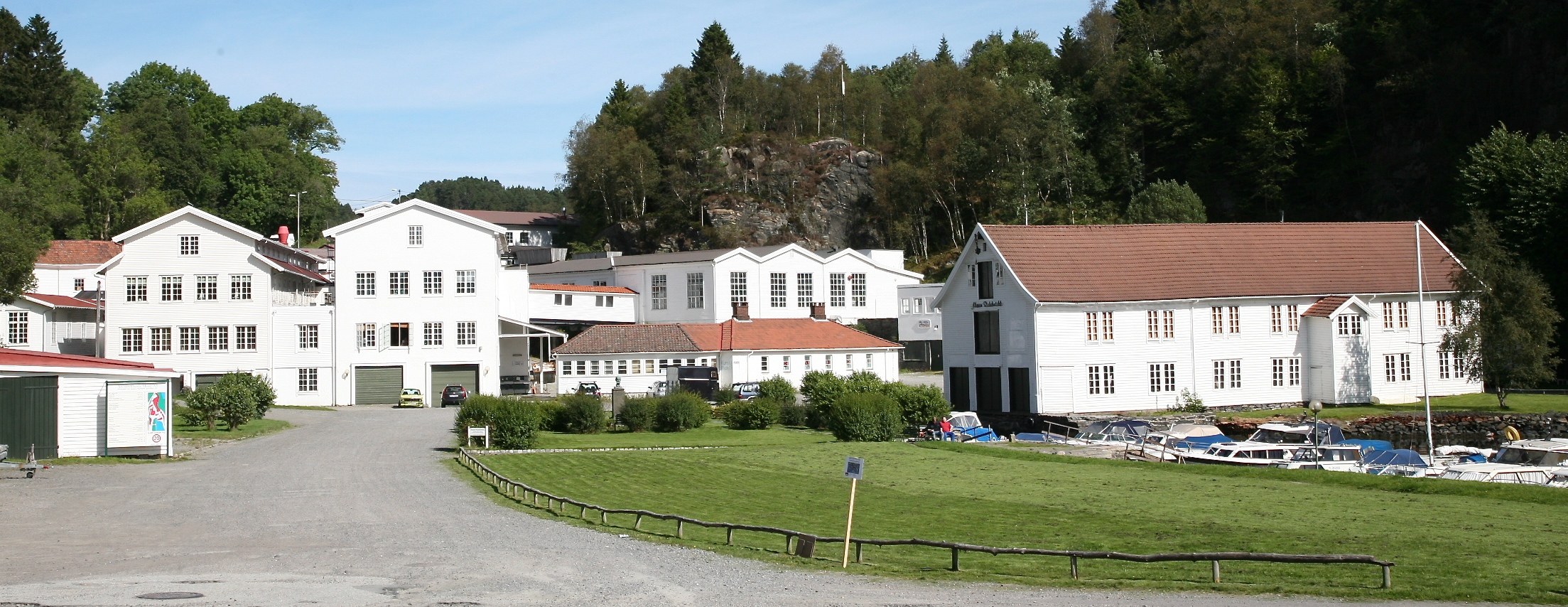
Alvøen papermill

Alvøen or Alvøy is a manor house located on a historic industrial site in the Laksevåg borough of the city of Bergen in Vestland county, Norway. Alvøen Manor was once one of the grander private homes in Bergen.

== History ==
Alvøen is the site one of Norway's oldest industrial communities and one of the best preserved industrial locations. In 1626, King Christian IV of Denmark granted the right to establish a gunpowder mill on the site. The mill was destroyed by fire in 1733, but rebuilt. Didrich Jansen Fasmer (1706-1770) improved it and built another gun mill in the 1760s. Towards the end of the 1700s, Alvøen became an industrial site with working houses attached to the factories. Later it started production of saltpeter, linseed oil and paper. Hendrik Jansen Fasmer (1766-1836) founded the paper mill during 1797. In 1858, Hendrik Fasmer (1835–1930) built a new papermill in Alvøen and from the late 1800s the production was concentrated on finer grades in different blends of cloths and cellulose. Alvøens Papirfabrik A/S manufacturing paper in Alvøen until stopped production in 1981. At that time, it was the oldest paper mill in the country. The specialty was finer paper for documents and from 1908, supplier of paper for Norwegian banknotes.

Alvøen Manor was the main residence of the owners of the paper factory of Alvøen. Alvøen Manor was originally built as a countryside retreat for members of the Fasmer family in 1797. Eventually the rococo main building was surrounded by several gardens.

Alvøen Manor and the factory were opened as a museum (Alvøen Hovedbygning) in 1983, as a branch of the West Norway Museum of Decorative Art. It is now managed by the Bergen City Museum. The site includes Alvøen Manor together with some forty worker cottages and production buildings dating from the 1800s.

Alvøen lies at the Vatlestraumen strait, west of Bergen, where the cargo ship Rocknes hit an underwater rock and capsized in January 2004. The wreckage was towed to Alvøen, stabilised and partly examined, before being taken to the CCB base at Ågotnes in Sotra for further examination and recovery.

== Interior of Alvøen manor ==
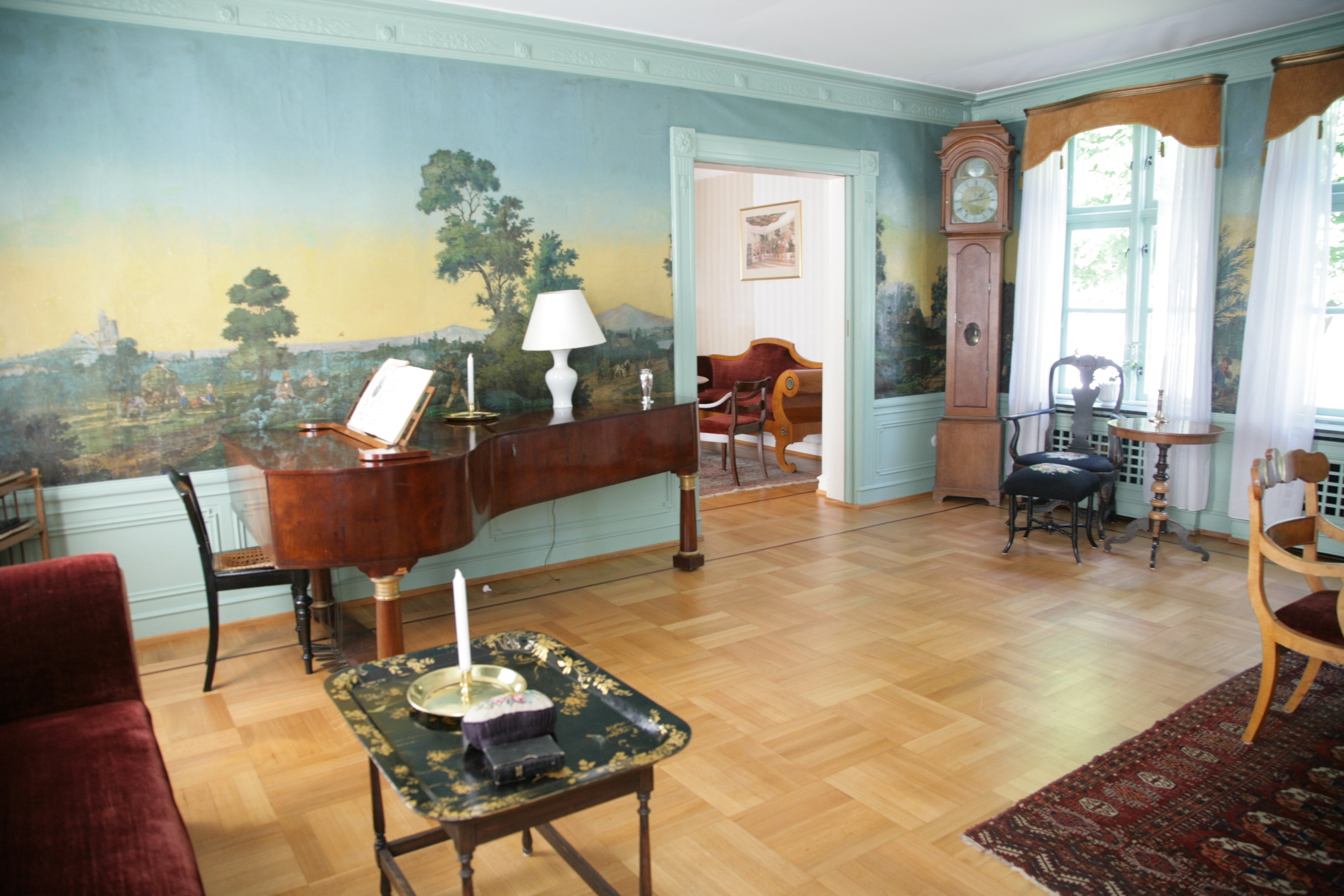
Living room

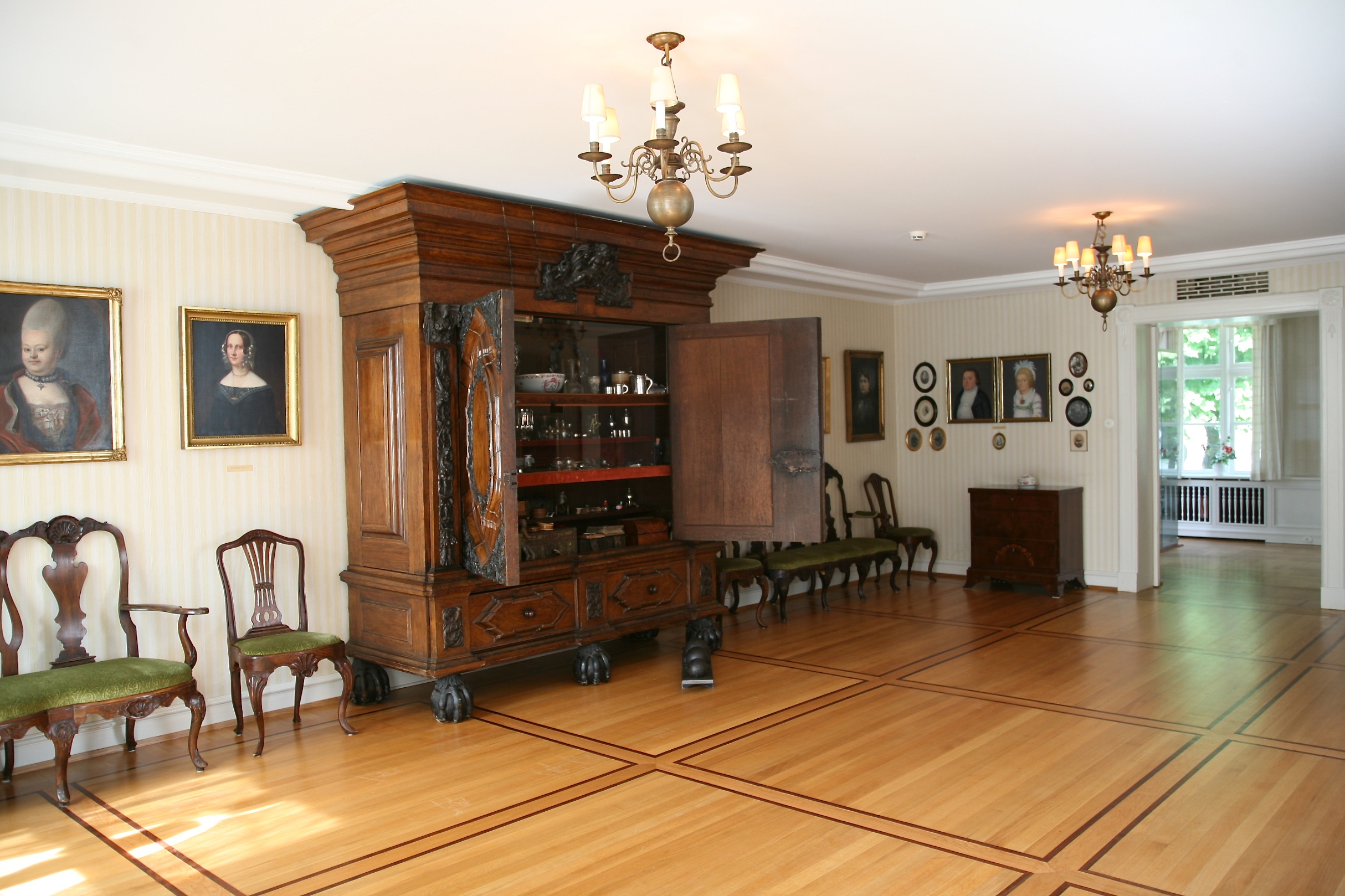
Large room

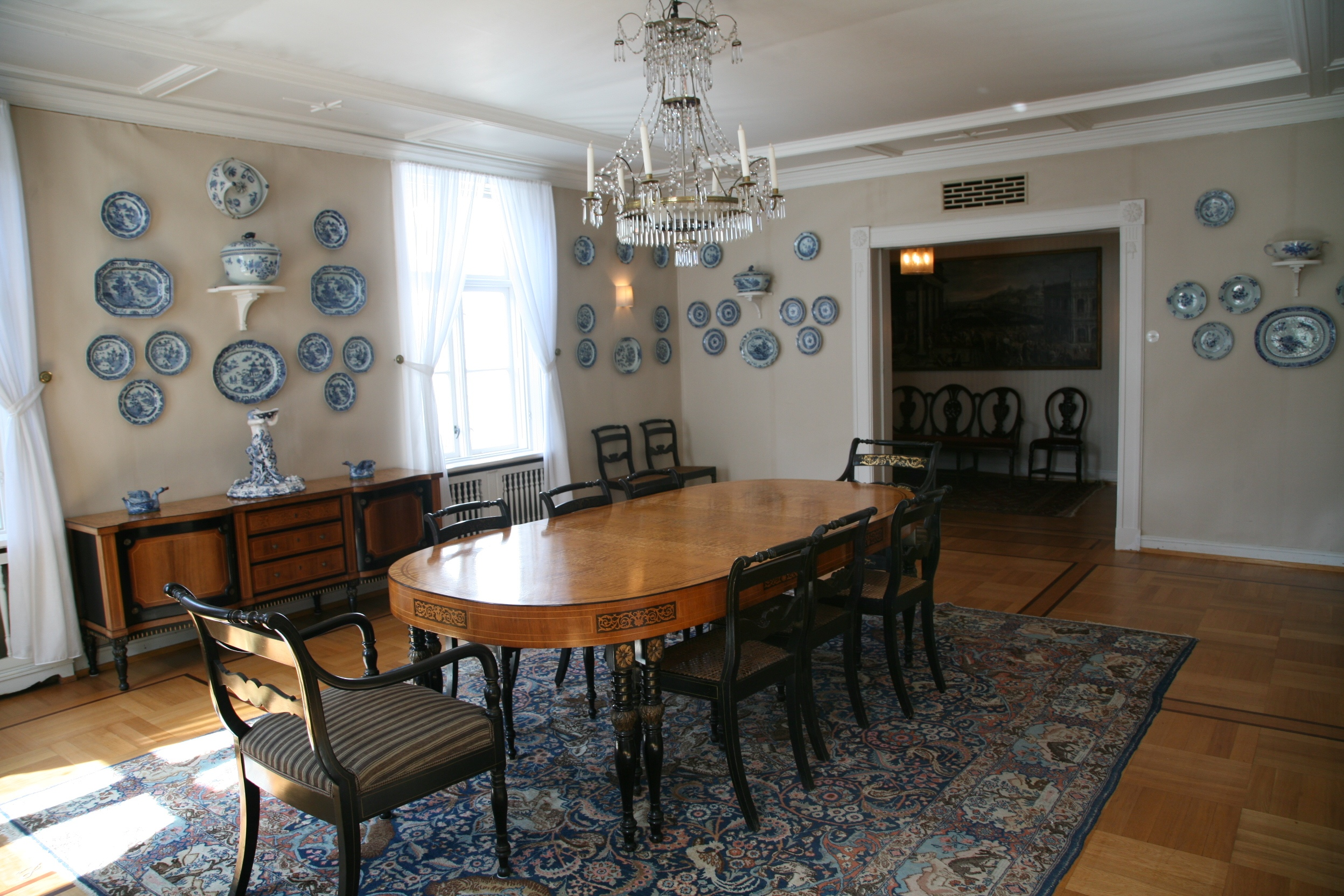
Dining room

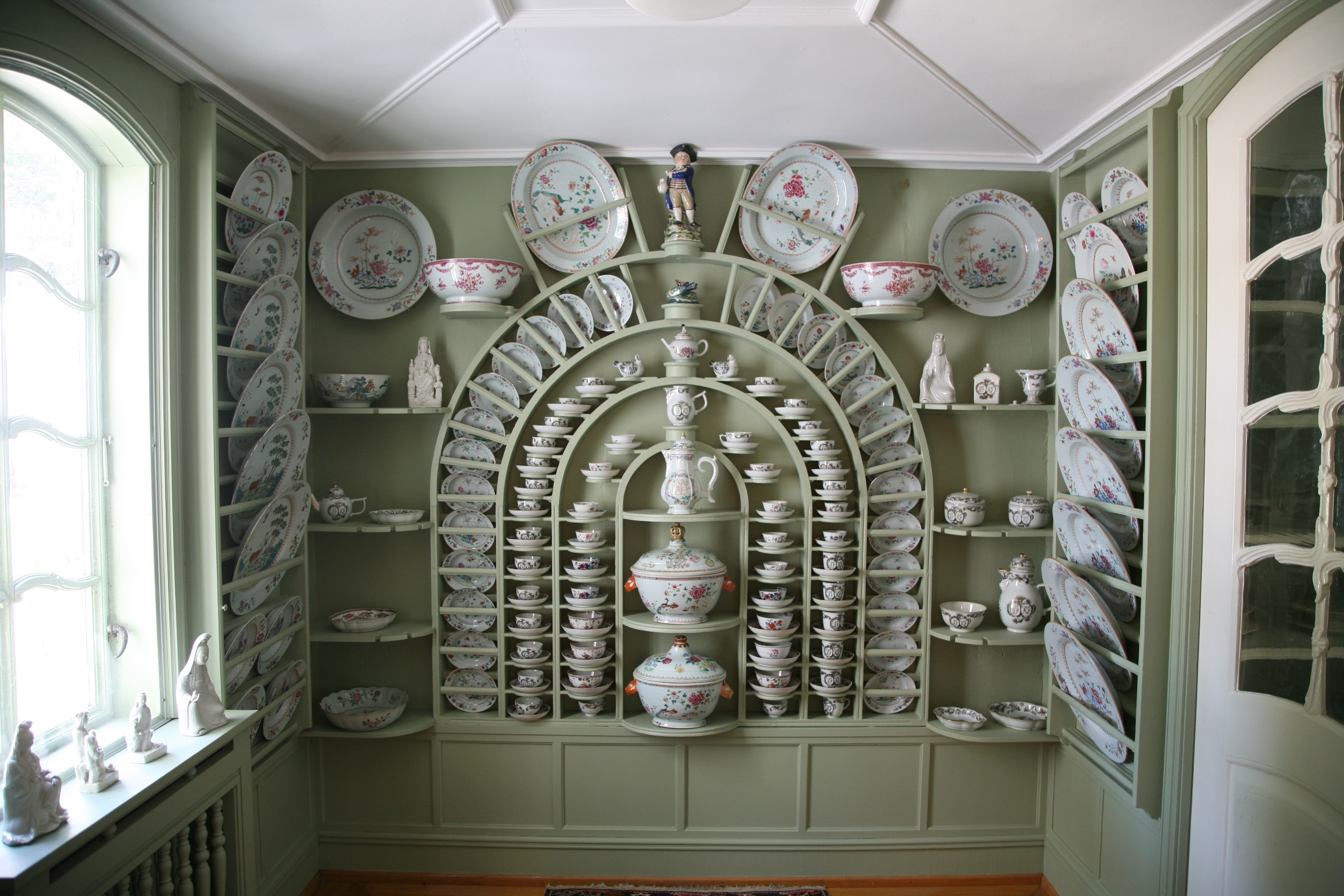
Porcelain chamber

== See also ==
- Battle of Alvøen
- Alvøyna, the similarly-named island in nearby Øygarden Municipality in Vestland county, Norway.
