= HMS Crocodile (1806) =

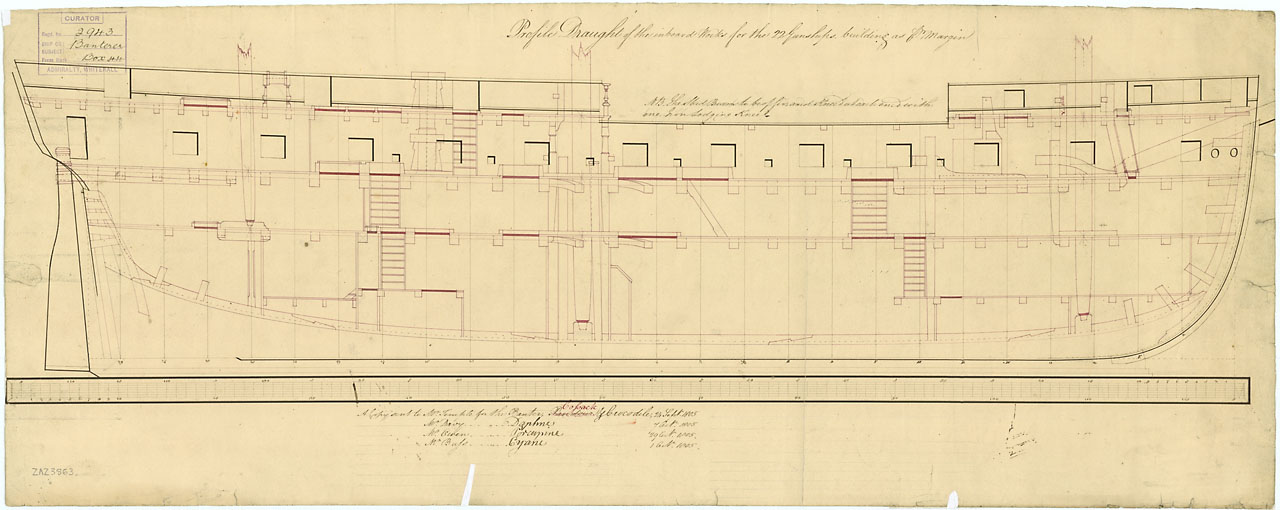
- Crocodile

History

United Kingdom
- Name: HMS Crocodile
- Ordered: 30 January 1805
- Builder: Simon Temple, South Shields
- Laid down: June 1805
- Launched: 19 April 1806
- Commissioned: July 1806
- Out of service: June 1815
- Fate: Broken up 1816

General characteristics
- Class & type: Banterer-class post-ship
- Tons burthen: 53850/94 (bm)
- Length: 118 ft 2 in (36.0 m) (overall); 98 ft 7 5/8 in (30.1 m) (keel)
- Beam: 32 ft 0 1/2 in (9.8 m)
- Depth of hold: 10 ft 7 in (3.2 m)
- Propulsion: Sail
- Complement: 155
- Armament: Designed; Upper deck (D):22 × 9-pounder guns; QD:6 × 24-pounder carronades; Fc:2 × 6-pounder Chase guns + 2 × 24-pounder carronades; Later; UD:22 × 32-pounder carronades; QD:2 × 6-pounder guns + 4 × 18-pounder carronades; Fc:2 × 6-pounder guns + 2 × 18-pounder carronades

HMS Crocodile was a 22-gun sixth-rate post-ship launched in South Shields in 1806. She was broken up at Portsmouth in October 1816.

== Career ==
In July 1806 Captain John Astley Bennet commissioned Crocodile, but was replaced within the month by Captain George Edmund Byron Bettesworth.

In March 1807 Crocodile detained the American ship General Clarke, from Philadelphia, and sent her into Plymouth.

On 18 April, Crocodile sailed from Portsmouth as escort to a convoy bound for Quebec. By 15 May she and about 30 vessels were at 47°N 37°W.

While with Crocodile, Bettesworth was involved in an unsuccessful claim for salvage rights to the American vessel Walker. A French privateer had captured Walker, but her crew had subsequently recaptured their ship when Crocodile came on the scene. Crocodile then escorted Walker to Halifax. For this service, Bettesworth claimed salvage rights. The court did not agree.

On 29 August 1807 Crocodile captured De Twende Brodre, while the privateer Lion was in sight. (Note: A first class share of the prize money was worth £12 8s 0½d; a sixth-class share, that of an ordinary seaman, was worth 1s 3¼d.) (Note: This was probably the cutter Lion, of 103 tons (bm), David Lewis, master. She had a crew of 20 men and was armed with twelve 4, 9, & 12-pounder guns.)

Around this time Crocodile detained the Danish packet ship Foedres Mende, from Batavia and Bengal, and sent her into The Downs. The Gunboat War had commenced as the Royal Navy had sailed to attack Copenhagen.

Captain the Hon. George Cadogan succeeded Bettesworth on 6 October 1807. His First Lieutenant was Thomas Barker Devon.

Cadogan and Crocodile sailed to the Cape of Good Hope in December 1807 as escort to the storeship Abundance and the transport Sally. They arrived in March after a voyage of 12 weeks. They brought recruits for the 29th, 72nd, and 93rd Regiments of Foot.

In August Crocodile carried Arthur Wellesley to Portugal to lead the British intervention in the Peninsular War. Crocodile was part of a squadron consisting of Donegal and Resistance, all under the command of Captain Pulteney Malcolm of Donegal. They escorted 75 transports, carrying 30,000 troops, from Cork to Mondego Bay.

In November Cadogan and Crocodile captured sundry Danish vessels. This led, in December 1809, to her receiving a distribution of £4000 in prize money; Cadogan would have received at least a quarter of that. On 21 December Crocodile was in company with Alexandria and Fury and shared in the capture on that day of Cupido and Speculation.

In March 1809 Crocodile captured three Danish vessels: Haabet, Manual, and Alexto, all carrying deals (a type of cheap lumber, usually of pine). The British gathered the vessels, and some more Danish vessels that other British vessels had captured, in Gothenburg. The captured vessels left Gothenburg on 23 March and by early April most had arrived at British ports. On 5 April Argus, of Norway, and also a prize to Crocodile, arrived in Yarmouth.

In mid-April 1809 Cadogan and Devons underwent a court-martial at Portsmouth. A Richard Cumberland had written to the Lords of the Admiralty that they had acted in a "cruel, tyrannical, and oppressive manner" towards his grandson, W.R. Badcock, a midshipman on Crocodile, and that this treatment had hastened Badcock's death. The court martial acquitted Cadogan and Devons, pointing out that the charges were not proven, that many of Cumberland's observations were unfounded, and that Badcock's death could not even remotely be tied to the punishment he had received on Crocodile.

Cadogan assumed command of Pallas on 16 September 1809. Captain Edward H. Columbine replaced him on Crocodile. On 13 January 1810 Columbine sailed Crocodile for Africa.

During her time with the West Africa Squadron, Crocodile or her ship's tenders detained 11 vessels, though the Vice admiralty court in Freetown restored several to their owners.

Date	Name	Nationality	Type	Where captured	Disposition	Slaves landed
4 April 1810	Polly		Sloop	Matacong	Restored to owners	0
4 April 1810	Doris	U.S.	Schooner	Matacong	Freetown	0
20 April 1810	Marianna	Spain		Off Sierra Leone	Freetown	186
24 April	Esperanza	U.S.	Schooner	Shebar River	Freetown	91
17 May 1805	Ama	Spain	Brig	Off Cape Three Points	Freetown	0
22 May 1805	Donna Marianna	Great Britain	Brig	Off Cape Coast Castle	Freetown	0
2 June 1810	Zaragozano	U.S.		Off Sierra Leone	Freetown	0
August 1810	St Jago	Spain	Schooner	Off Sierra Leone	Restored to owners	57
11 September 1810	Diana	U.S.		Off Sierra Leone	Restored to owners	84
October 1810	Emprenadadora	U.S.		Off Sierra Leone	Restored to owners	0
October 1810	Los Do Amigos	U.S.		Off Sierra Leone	Restored to owners	0

On 22 May Crocodile took Donna Marianna for breach of the Act for the abolition of the slave trade. Although Donna Marianna was ostensibly a Portuguese vessel, a British court on appeal upheld the seizure on the grounds that she was actually a British vessel and her Portuguese papers were a fraud. (Note: A moiety of the proceeds of the seizure was then paid in November 1814. The distribution to the officers and crew was governed by the provisions of His Majesty's Act in Council of 12 October 1764, not the more recent changes in the prize law. Columbine's share of the distribution was worth £443 17s 0d; a seaman's share was worth £1 15s 9d. The reason that the 1764 Order pertained was that Donna Marianna was treated as a smuggler. It was only on 14 October 1816 that a new Order in Council rescinded the 1764 Order, and brought the treatment of bounty money for smugglers in line with that for other prizes.)

Thomas Ludlam, former Governor of Sierra Leone died on board HMS Crocodile on 25 July 1810.

On 22 May 1811, Columbine and Crocodile sailed for Britain, briefly in company with Protector. On 19 June Columbine died during the night and in the morning the crew buried him at sea.

Captain John Richard Lumley succeeded Columbine in 1811, and was himself replaced by Captain William Elliot in June 1812. Elliot and Crocodile served on the Channel Islands station. Still, Elliot sailed her for Portugal on 9 November.

On 24 April 1813 Santos Marter, De Souza, master, arrived at Gibraltar. She had been sailing from Charleston to Cádiz when Crocodile captured her. Two weeks later, on 9 May, Roba & Betsey, Baldry, master, arrived at Gibraltar. She had been sailing from Charleston to Cadiz when Crocodile captured her.

== Fate ==
Crocodile was paid off in June 1815. She then was broken up in October 1816 at Portsmouth.
