= Thomas Ludlam (colonial administrator) =

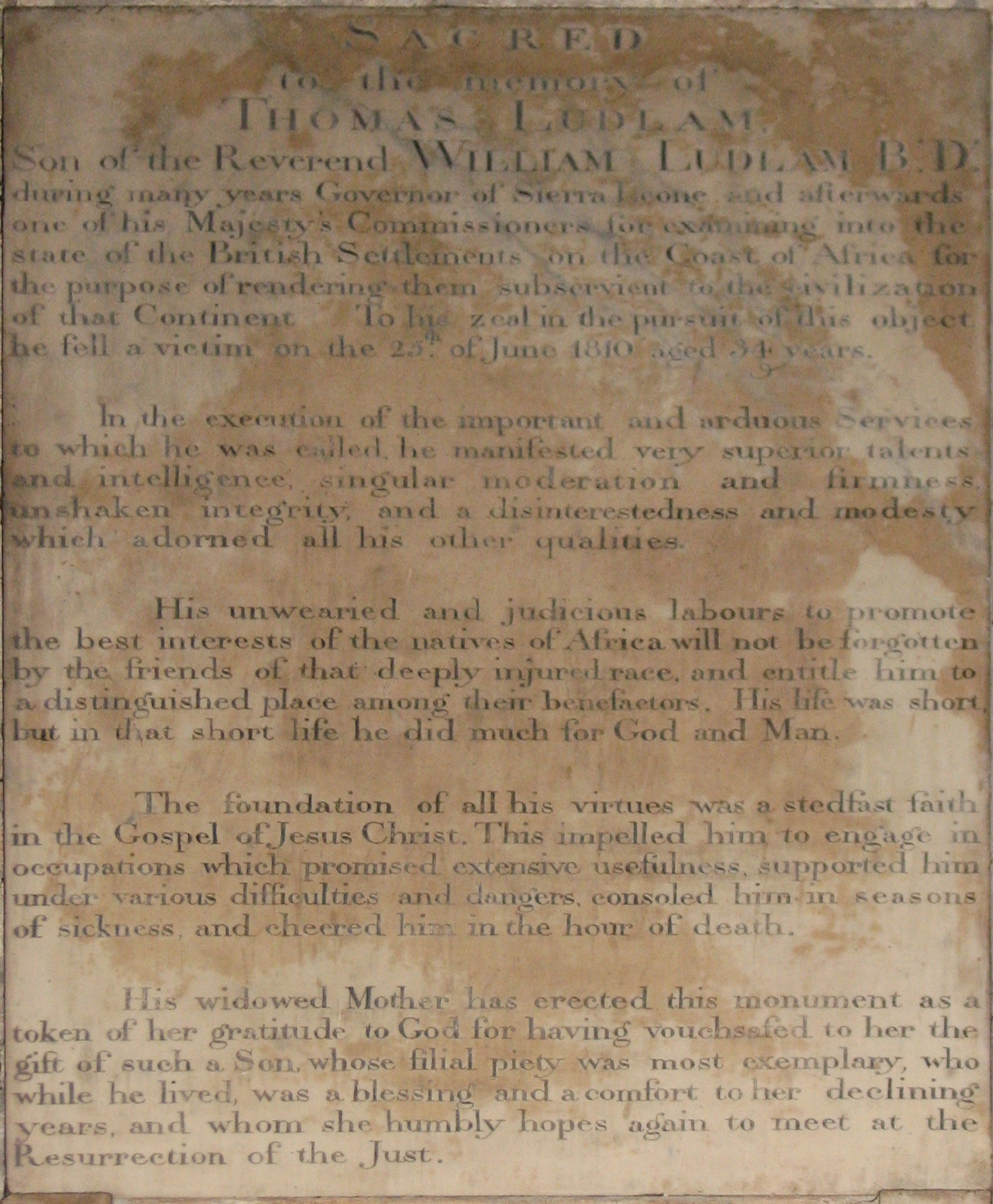
Memorial tablet to Thomas Ludlam in St Mary de Castro church, Leicester. Placed in the church by his mother.

Thomas Ludlam (ca. 1775 – 25 July 1810) was a British colonial administrator who was thrice Governor of Sierra Leone.

== Biography ==
Ludlam was the son of William Ludlam and Frances Ludlam, née Dowley, and nephew to Thomas Ludlam the clergyman. He was baptised in Leicester on 15 September 1775.

He received a classical education. He shared his father's practical abilities and trained as a printer, being apprenticed to John Nichols. However shortly following the completion of his apprenticeship the opportunity for him to take up a post with the Sierra Leone Company (SLC) arose, and he moved to their colony in Africa.

Having previously served on the Council of the SLC, he subsequently rose to become governor, fulfilling the role three times: May 1799 – 1800, 28 August 1803 – January 1805 and 1806 – 27 July 1808.

On 19 November 1807, Ludlam arrested the American slave ship Triton, enacting the newly established Slave Trade Act 1807.

He died on board HMS Crocodile on 25 July 1810.
