= Thomas Ludlam (priest) =

Thomas Ludlam (1727–1811) was an English priest, theologian and essayist. He was a disciple of John Locke and opposed Calvinistic writers.

== Life ==
Born at Leicester, he was younger brother to William Ludlam. He graduated B.A. at St John's College, Cambridge, in 1748, and spent some time as chaplain in the Royal Navy, on 31 May 1750 appointed to HMS Prince Henry. In January 1750 he was in Sierra Leone, of which his nephew, also called Thomas Ludlam, subsequently became governor. He proceeded M.A. in 1752.

Ludlum was appointed by the assistance of John Jackson confrater of Wigston's Hospital, Leicester, in 1760. In 1791 he became rector of Foston, Leicestershire. He died at Leicester on 13 November 1811.

== Works ==
Ludlam attacked the Calvinistic writers of his day in the Orthodox Churchman's Review. He was a disciple of John Locke, and applied Locke's principles to religious discussion. Bishop Richard Hurd, on seeing his first essay, had his second to be printed at his own expense.

Ludlam's brother William held unpopular views on the Holy Spirit, and Thomas supported them in his Four Essays. A savage controversialist, he was charged by Isaac Milner with "treating men as fanatics, enthusiasts, and rejecters of reason, or as sly, artful, and designing characters, because they venture to think for themselves in religious matters".

Ludlam wrote:

- Logical Tracts on Locke, Cambridge [1790]; vindicating Locke against Milner, George Horne, and others.
- Four Essays on the Holy Spirit, London, 1797.
- Six Essays upon Theological, to which are added two upon Moral, Subjects, London, 1798.

Most of these essays are in Essays, Scriptural, Moral, and Logical, by William and Thomas Ludlam, 1807; 2nd edit. 1809.
