= Harlowbury =

Manor in Harlow, Essex, England

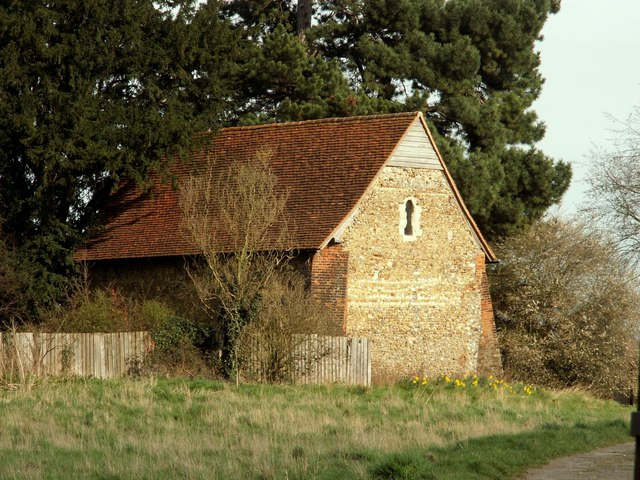
- Harlowbury Chapel

- Location within Essex Location within England
- 51°47′16.800″N 0°8′26.448″E
- OS grid reference: TL 47745 12096

History
- Founded: 1044
- Built for: Bury St Edmunds Abbey

Site notes
- Architectural style: Norman

Listed Building – Grade I
- Designated: 4 July 1950 (chapel); 15 June 1977 (manor)
- Reference no.: 1111694 (chapel); 1306455 (manor)

Harlowbury, historically Herlaue Abbatis, was a medieval manor located in modern-day Harlow, Essex, England. The area's history dates back at least to the Iron Age, and a Roman villa is located not far from the site. The manor was adjacent to a now-deserted medieval village; both the villa and village are scheduled monuments. Harlowbury was first established as an estate under the Abbey of Bury St Edmunds in 1044. In 1539, the abbey was dissolved and the lands were sold to private owners: first to the Addington family, in 1680 to the North family of the Earldom of Guilford, and finally in 1879 to John Perry-Watlington.

The manorial estate and Harlowbury Chapel, a Norman-era church and the oldest building in Harlow, are now scheduled monuments. Both the manor house and chapel are Grade I listed by Historic England.

== Background ==
Formal settlement in the immediate vicinity has been dated back to Iron Age and Roman times. Excavations in the 19th century unveiled the remains of a Roman villa or temple, including a complex of several rectangular buildings and tesselated paths next to a roadway to Pishiobury. Below this were traces of an earlier Iron Age settlement. This complex is located 500 metres (1,600 ft) northeast of Harlowbury and is a scheduled monument.

Occupation on the site continued as a small village through the Anglo-Saxon and medieval periods, but by the late 11th century, the village nucleus had moved south along Churchgate Street. By 1287, the epicenter of Harlow had moved south to Mulberry Green. Today, the deserted medieval village immediately south of Harlowbury is also a scheduled monument.

== History ==
=== Abbey period (1044–1539) ===
In 1044, thegn Thurstan son of Wine gave the land to the Abbey of Bury St Edmunds in 1044. It was situated immediately northeast of the medieval village, although part of its estate encompassed woodlands on the south side of the settlement's common land. Harlowbury shared Ealing Bridge, which crosses Pincey Brook, with the Sheering manor. Originally, Harlowbury may also have been combined with the manors in Latton, where 3 1/2 hides were also controlled by the abbey. A 1066 evaluation showed the property was 1 1/2 hide; by 1086, it had grown to 4 1/2, distributed across five men, although these likely later became the manors of Hubbards Hall and Moor Hall. The Domesday Book recorded it as the main settlement in the parish of Harlow, having "31 villeins, bordars, and serfs... [and] 8 ploughteams, a water mill, 4 rounceys, 25 beasts, 50 swine, 60 sheep, 3 colts, and 5 hives of bees". Stephen, King of England, enlarged the manor c. 1150. A tax return filed for the Harlow hundred in 1237–1238 referred to Harlowbury as Herlaue Abbatis (Harlow Abbotts). The name Harlowbury was first mentioned in 1351.

Over its history, the area was farmed and pastoralized. Besides the farms and pastures, Harlowbury also featured an orchard, garden and fish ponds. Between the 13th and 15th centuries, Harlowbury shared grazing space on Stanegrove Hill with Latton Hall and Mark Hall. In 1287, tenants were spread across 14 virgates and half-virgates. 138 tenants were recorded in 1360, but over time, expected labour from villeins declined. By c. 1430, the manor was leased to various different tenants, who were no longer expected to provide labour services; around that time, John Dobbs held the lease, followed by Giles Mallory in the early 16th century. In 1532, Thomas Cromwell attempted to gain a lease but was denied, and instead accepted a £10 annual pension. William Sumner gained a lease in 1536, and his family stayed at the manor until 1610.

=== Addington and North families (1539–1879) ===
The Bury St Edmunds Abbey dissolved in 1539, ending its involvement in the manor, which entered a freehold under the Crown. In 1544, the manor was sold to the widow and son of Sir Thomas Addington, Catherine and Thomas, respectively. After the junior Thomas's death in 1554, the manor briefly fell to his cousin Ralph Addington, who was deemed insane in 1555, and his land was granted to his cousin John Addington. John's male descendants kept possession of the manor until 1668, when ownership jumped to an uncle Richard Addington, then to his own nephews, Arthur Champernoun and Richard Way, upon his death just two years later.

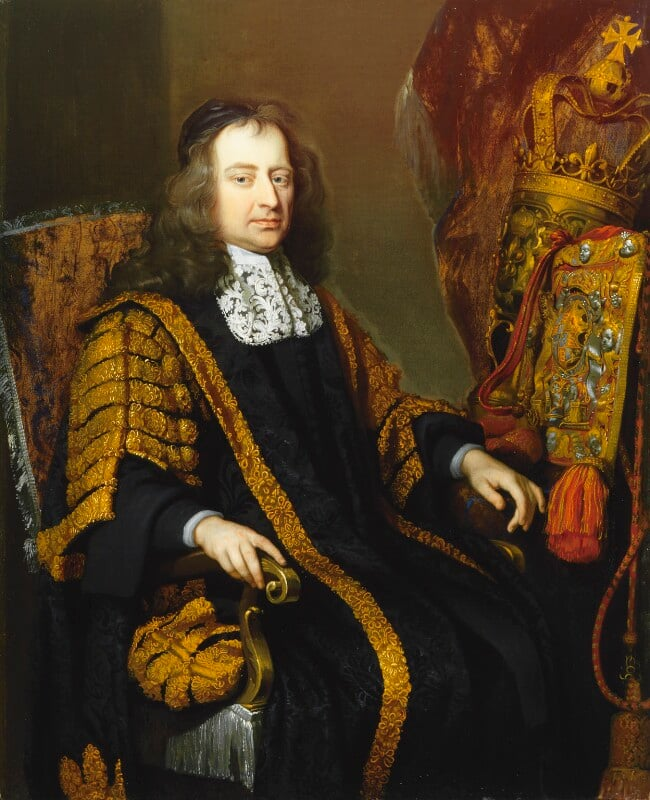
Francis North, 1st Baron Guilford, whose family owned the manor until 1827

By this time, Harlowbury had acquired a large amount of debt, and the Champernoun and Way families sold the manor to Francis North, 1st Baron Guilford, in 1680. Although Francis North died just five years later, the North family line of succession kept the manor, preceding thusly through the Barony and then Earldom of Guilford:

- 1680–1729: Francis North, 2nd Baron Guilford
- 1729–1790: Francis North, 1st Earl of Guilford
- 1790–1792: Frederick North, Lord North, Prime Minister of Great Britain
- 1792–1802: George North, 3rd Earl of Guilford
- 1802–1817: Francis North, 4th Earl of Guilford
- 1817–1827: Frederick North, 5th Earl of Guilford

After 1827, the manor was jointly held amongst George North's three daughters: Lady Maria North, wife of John Crichton-Stuart, 2nd Marquess of Bute; Lady Susan North; and Lady Georgiana North. In 1831, their estate was divided and Harlowbury was given to the Butes. After John's death in 1848, the manor was transferred to Lady Maria Bute's nephew William North, and he took possession after coming of age in 1861.

Neither the Addingtons nor the Norths actually resided at the manor. Tenancy in 1680 carried over from the Addington period, beginning with Richard Wall. By the 1760s, the Barnard family was leasing it; in 1849, the tenants were recorded jointly as being William and John Barnard.

In 1835, the Harlow Common Church of England established a school on unused manor grounds, next to St. Mary Magdalene's Church. By 1884, the school was deemed inadequate for education and the building dated. Over the next decade, improvements were made to the organization and building itself, but in 1912 a new school opened elsewhere. The school was used for various educational purposed until it closed in 1958.

=== Later history (1879–present) ===
William North began selling parts of his Harlow estates to various interests in 1876. Around 1879, North sold Harlow Mill to the Barnards, and around 1879 sold Harlowbury itself to John Perry-Watlington, then owner of Moor Hall. Both Harlowbury and Moor Hall passed through the Perry-Watlington family until 1914, when both fell into the possession of Robert Ethelston's trustees.

== Manor house ==
Harlowbury Hall is a Grade I-listed building by Historic England. It dates back to the abbey period, and the modern building was constructed c. 1300. Originally, as an abbey, the building featured monastic aisles, which were likely demolished in the late 16th century, at the same time a fireplace and upper floor were installed. An original eastern wing of the building was demolished around the turn of the 15th century, although it was partially restored about 100 years later. The current staircase dates to the 18th century. The entire building—except for the northern elevation—was encased in brick in the 19th century.

== Harlowbury Chapel ==
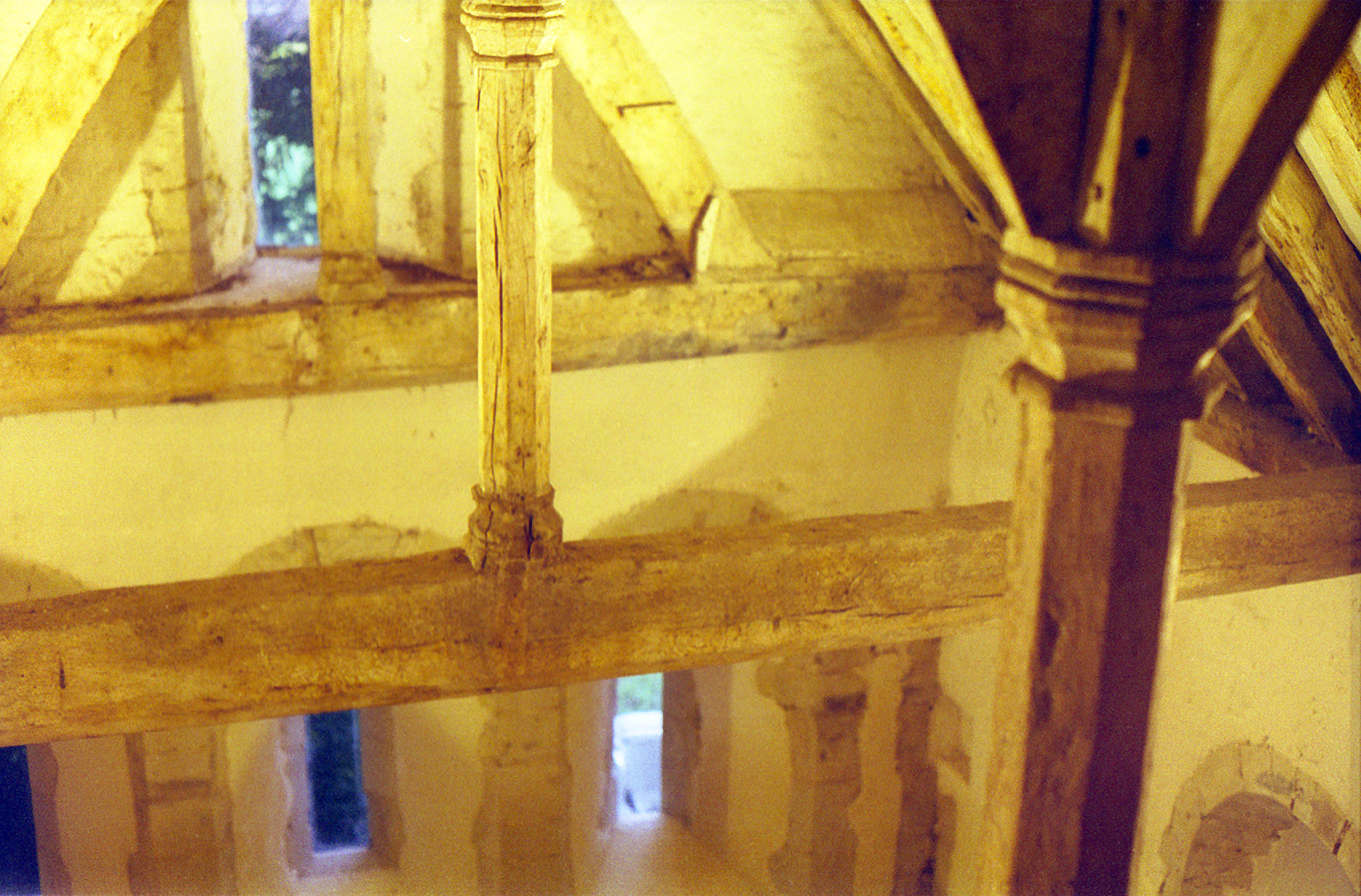
12th century beams inside Harlowbury Chapel

Harlowbury Chapel was built c. 1180 by Abbott Samson for use as a private worship spot for the manor. Excavations in May 1984 revealed signs of an earlier Saxon temple on the site. Post pits were radiocarbon dated to about AD 640–820.

The chapel is of simple construction, consisting of a plain rectangular floor plan and constructed from flint rubble, with minimal brick buttress decorations and stone dressings. It retains the original arched doorway and some rounded windows. Around 1300, crown posts were installed in place of the original rafters. The walls were heightened and the roof reconstructed during the 15th century, and a second floor was added in the 17th, for use as a granary. It is the oldest building still standing in Harlow and today is managed by a trust. As with the manor house, the chapel is a Grade I-listed building, as well as a scheduled monument.

== See also ==
- England in the Middle Ages
- Grade I listed buildings in Essex
