= High Steward of Banbury =

The High Steward of Banbury is a ceremonial title bestowed by Banbury Town Council in Banbury, Oxfordshire, England.

The stewardship was established by royal charter in 1554, during the reign of Mary I. By the same charter, Banbury became a parliamentary borough, which the seat remained until 1885. The High Steward was a major figure within the corporation, and the role was closely associated with the town's Parliamentary representation. In today’s civic hierarchy the High Steward, who is usually a peer and has to be at least a knight of the realm, is an ‘officer of dignity and influence’ but with few specific duties and no monetary rewards.

For several hundred years the title was held by members of the North and Fiennes families, the major landowners in north Oxfordshire. In 1818 the title is recorded as having been "hereditary" for the Earls of Guilford, although this recording appears to be erroneous. The role fell dormant following the death of the 20th Baron Saye and Sele in 1968; it was revived in February 2016 for Sir Tony Baldry.

== High Stewards of Banbury ==
- William Knollys, 1st Earl of Banbury (until 1632)
- William Fiennes, 1st Viscount Saye and Sele (1632–1662)
- Francis Godolphin, 2nd Earl of Godolphin (1718–1776)
- Francis North, 1st Earl of Guilford (1752–1790)
- Frederick North, 2nd Earl of Guilford (1790–1792)
- George North, 3rd Earl of Guilford (1792–1802)
- Francis North, 4th Earl of Guilford (1802–1817)
- John Crichton-Stuart, 2nd Marquess of Bute (1817–1848)
- Frederick Fiennes, 16th Baron Saye and Sele (1849–1887)
- William North, 11th Baron North (1887–1932)
- Ivo Murray Twisleton-Wykeham-Fiennes, 20th Baron Saye and Sele (1932–1968; after which the role fell into dormancy)
- Sir Tony Baldry (since 2016)
