= Anne North, Countess of Guilford =

British noblewoman

The Right Honourable The Countess of Guilford
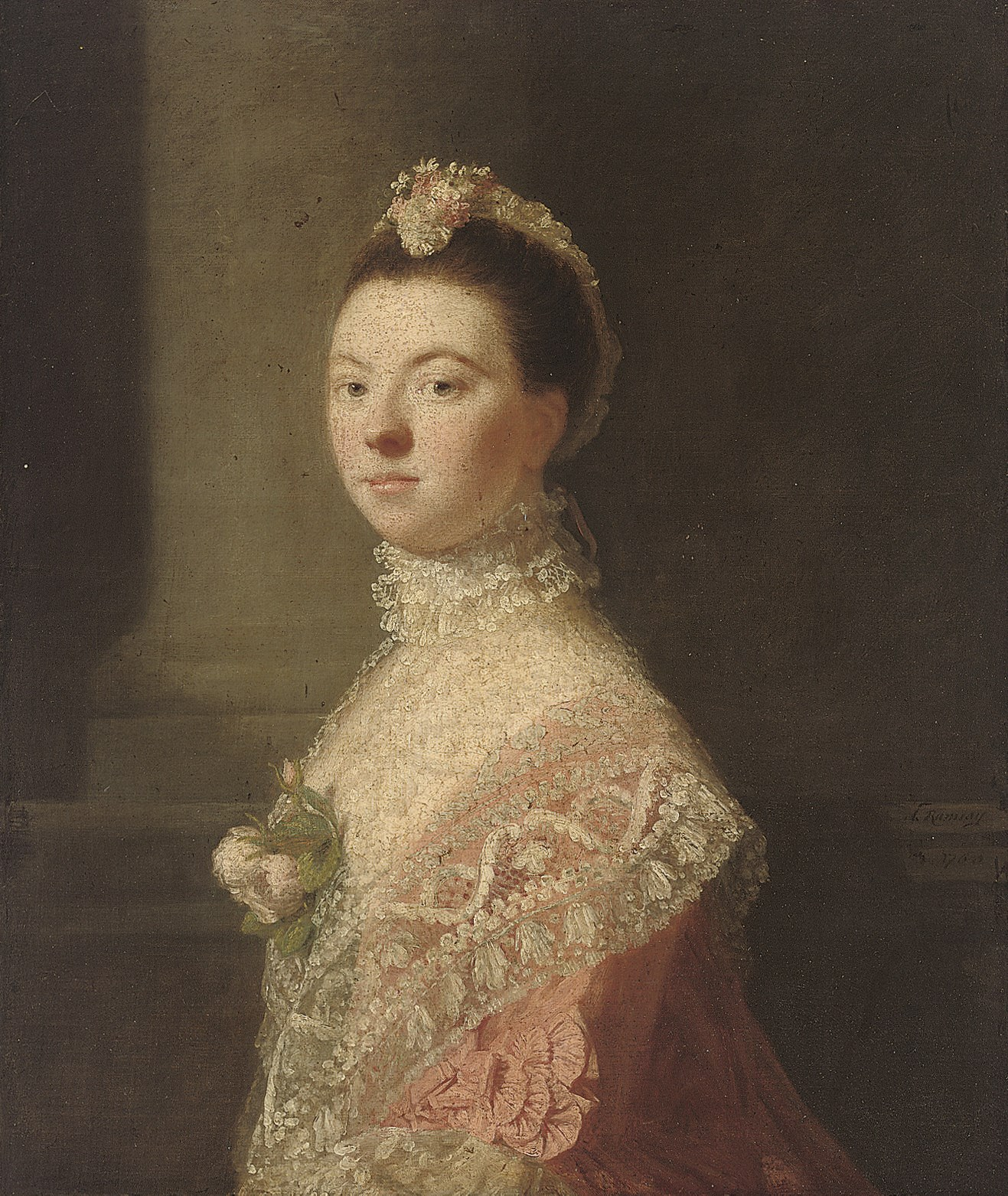
- painting by Allan Ramsay, 1760.
- Born: Anne Speke c. 1740; Ilminster, Somerset, Great Britain
- Died: 17 January 1797 (aged 56–57); Bushy House, London, Great Britain
- Resting place: Church of All Saints, Wroxton
- Known for: Wife of the Prime Minister 1770–82
- Spouse: Frederick North, Lord North (m. 1756; died 1792)
- Children: 7, including George North, 3rd Earl of Guilford, Francis North, 4th Earl of Guilford and Frederick North, 5th Earl of Guilford
- Parents: George Speke (father); Anne Speke (née Williams) (mother)

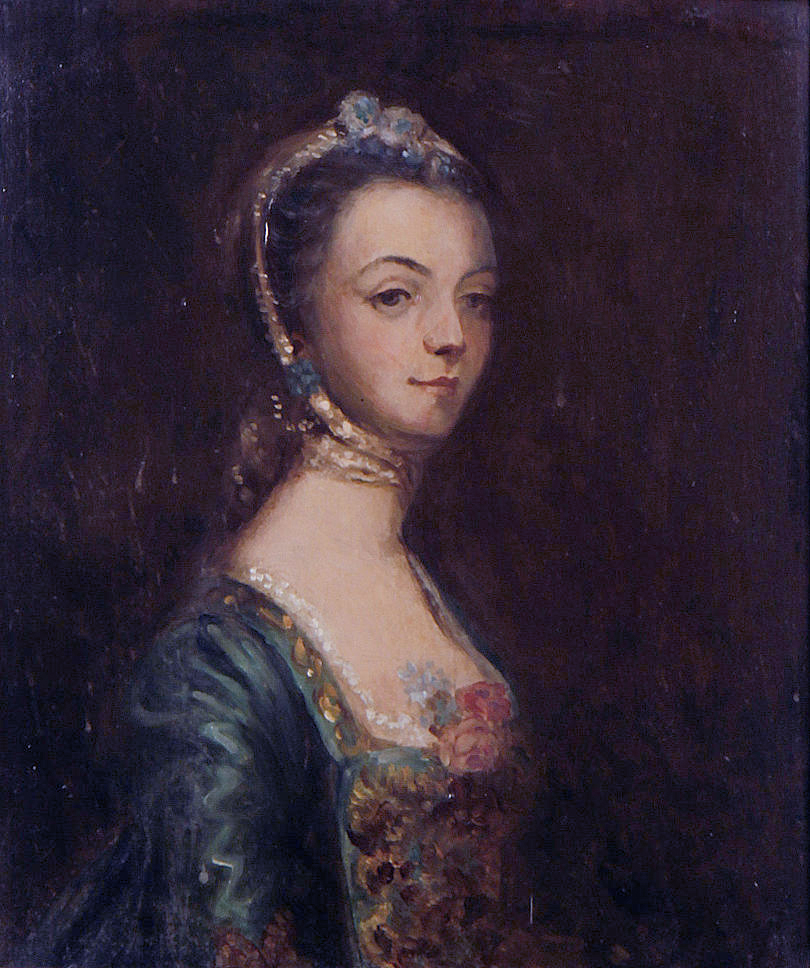
Copy of a portrait by Joshua Reynolds

Anne North, Countess of Guilford (née Speke; 1740 – 17 January 1797) was an English woman of the 18th century, best known as the wife of Frederick, Lord North, who was Prime Minister of Great Britain between 1770 and 1782. During his term in office, she was known as "Lady North"; she became Countess of Guilford when her father-in-law died in 1790.

== Early life ==
Anne was born around 1739–1741 in Ilminster, Somerset, to George Speke MP and his third wife Anne (née Williams). Her father died in 1753, when Anne was about 12 years old, and she inherited the former Drake estates in Devonshire, as well as Dillington House.

== Married life ==
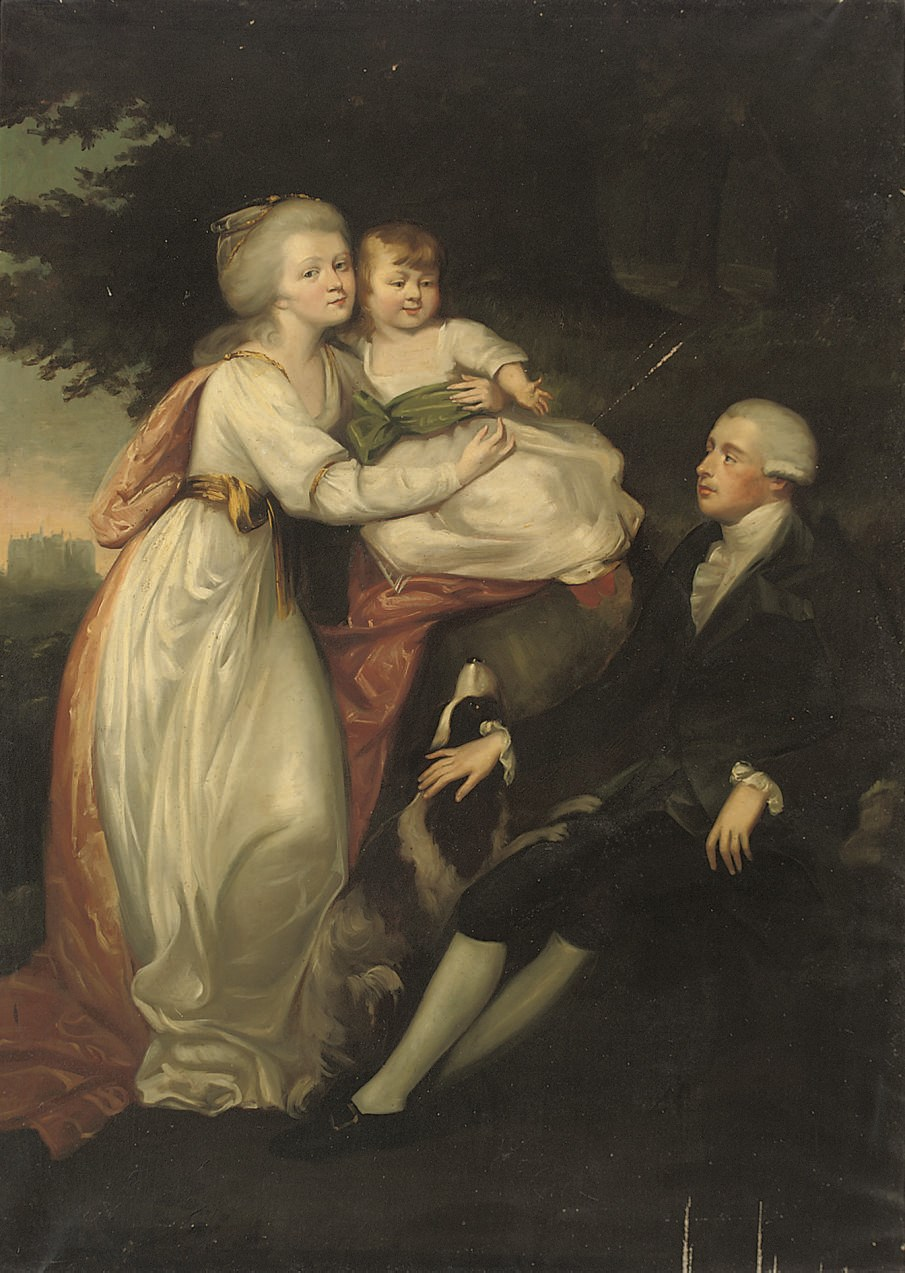
Portrait c. 1760 of Lady and Lord North with one of their children, possibly George Augustus.

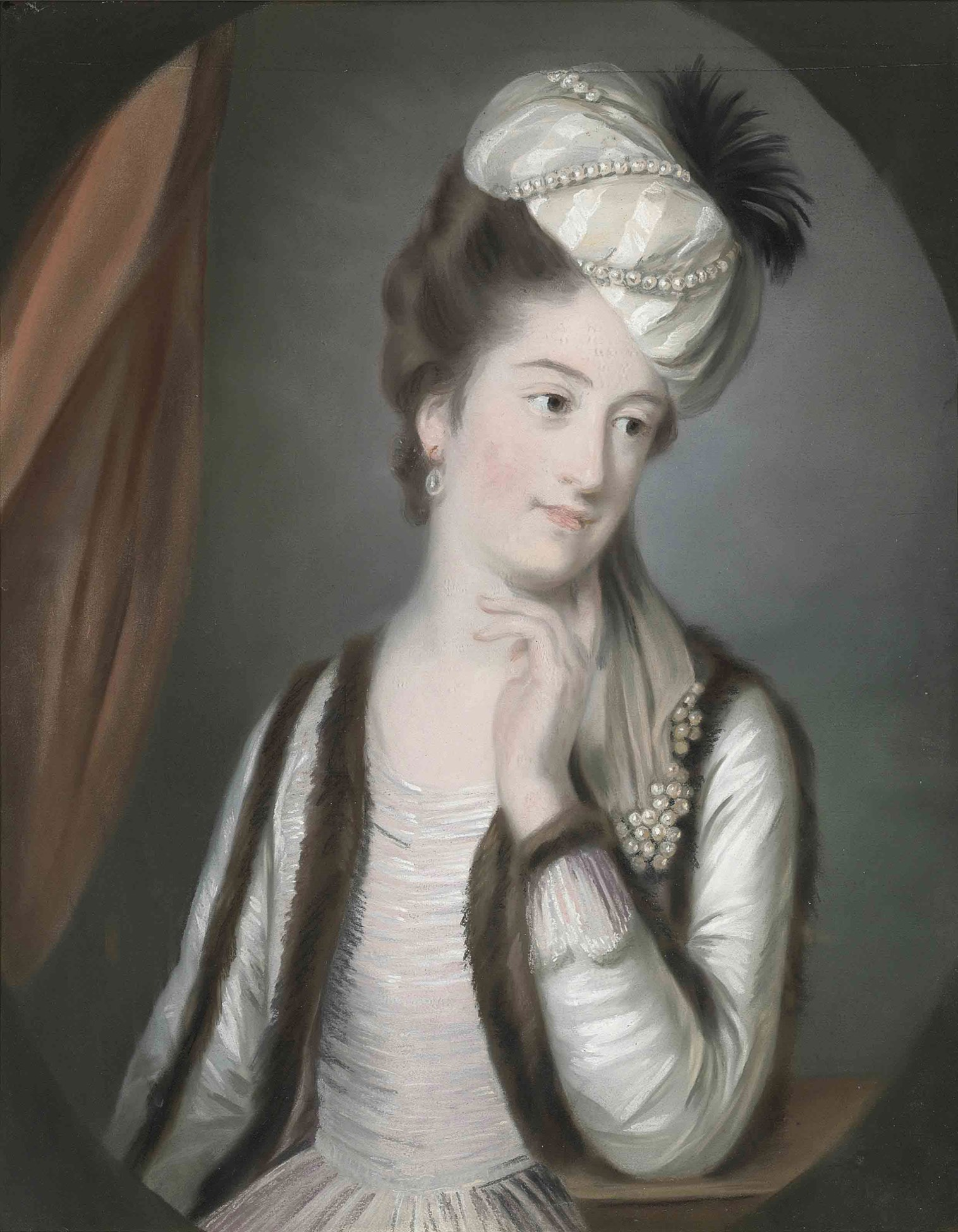
Portrait of Lady North, painting by Catherine Read

On 20 May 1756, aged about sixteen, Anne married Frederick, Lord North, who was the eldest son of Lord Guilford and was then the MP for Banbury. He was about eight years her senior. Her inheritance was worth about four thousand pounds a year. Jokes in society mocked the couple's lack of good looks, Lady Harcourt saying that the short and plump Lord North was “beautiful in comparison to the Lady the world said he is to marry.” However, their marriage appears to have been a happy one.

She gave birth to their first child, George Augustus, on 11 September 1757. A daughter, Catherine Anne, followed in 1760, and another son, Francis, in 1761, and a second daughter, Charlotte. In 1766 Lord North became Paymaster of the Forces and Anne gave birth to their third son, Frederick. Lord North became Chancellor of the Exchequer the following year, serving in that post until 1782.

=== Children ===
Lord and Lady North had seven children:

- George Augustus North, 3rd Earl of Guilford (11 September 1757 – 20 April 1802), who married, firstly, Maria Frances Mary Hobart-Hampden (died 23 April 1794), daughter of the 3rd Earl of Buckinghamshire, on 30 September 1785 and had issue. He married, secondly, Susan Coutts (died 24 September 1837), on 28 February 1796.
- Catherine Anne North (1760–1817), who married Sylvester Douglas, 1st Baron Glenbervie, and had one child.
- Francis North, 4th Earl of Guilford (25 December 1761 – 1817)
- Lady Anne North (8 January 1764 – 18 January 1832), who married the 1st Earl of Sheffield on 20 January 1798 and had two children
- Frederick North, 5th Earl of Guilford (7 February 1766 – 1827)
- Lady Charlotte North (December 1770–25 October 1849), who married Lt. Col. The Hon. John Lindsay (15 March 1762 – 6 March 1826), son of the 5th Earl of Balcarres, on 2 April 1800.
- Dudley North (31 May 1777 – 1779). His name is missing from some lists of Lord and Lady North's children, which incorrectly state they only had six.

=== Prime Minister's wife ===
In 1770 Lord North became First Lord of the Treasury (Prime Minister of Great Britain) and formed a government that was mostly Tories. His government saw the American Revolutionary War, which meant that Britain lost most of its North American colonies. Lord North was forced from office by a motion of no confidence in 1782, following defeat at the Battle of Yorktown.

In 1786 she met with Abigail Adams (wife of John Adams, then US Ambassador to Great Britain) in London, and Abigail wrote an unflattering description of Lady North and her daughter Anne in a letter to Lucy Cranch:

I cannot close without describing to you Lady North and her daughter. She is as large as Captain Clarks wife and much such a made woman, with a much fuller face, of the coulour and complexion of mrs cook who formerly lived with your uncle Palmer, and looks as if Porter and Beaf stood no chance before her. Add to this, that it is cover[e]d with large red pimples over which to help the natural redness, a coat of Rouge is spread, and to assist her shape, she was drest in white sattin trimd with Scarlet ribbon. Miss North is not so large nor quite So red, but a very small Eye with the most impudent face you can possibly form an Idea of, joined to manners so Masculine that I was obliged frequently to recollect that line of Dr Youngs— “Believe her dress; shes not a Grenidier” to persuade myself that I was not mistaken.

=== Later life and death ===
Lord North began to go blind in 1786, and retired from active politics in 1790, in which year he succeeded to the title of Earl of Guilford, making Anne a countess. Visiting the North family in 1787, Horace Walpole said that he "never saw a more interesting scene. Lord North's spirits, good humour, wit, sense, drollery, are as perfect as ever—the unremitting attention of Lady North and his children most touching. … If ever loss of sight could be compensated, it is by so affectionate a family." Lord North died in 1792.

The Countess of Guilford died in 1797 in Bushy House, Teddington, London, and was buried in Wroxton. Writing about her mother, Charlotte Lindsay reminisced that she

was plain in her person, but had excellent good sense, and was blessed with singular mildness and placidity of temper. She was also not deficient in humour, and her conversational powers were by no means contemptible; but she, like the rest of the world, delighted in her husband's conversation, and being by nature shy and indolent, was contented to be a happy listener... Whether they had been in love when they married I don't know, but I am sure there never was a more happy union than theirs during the thirty-six years that it lasted. I never saw an unkind look, or heard an unkind word pass between them; his affectionate attachment to her was as unabated as her love and admiration of him.
