= Frederick Sylvester North Douglas =

British politician (1791–1819)

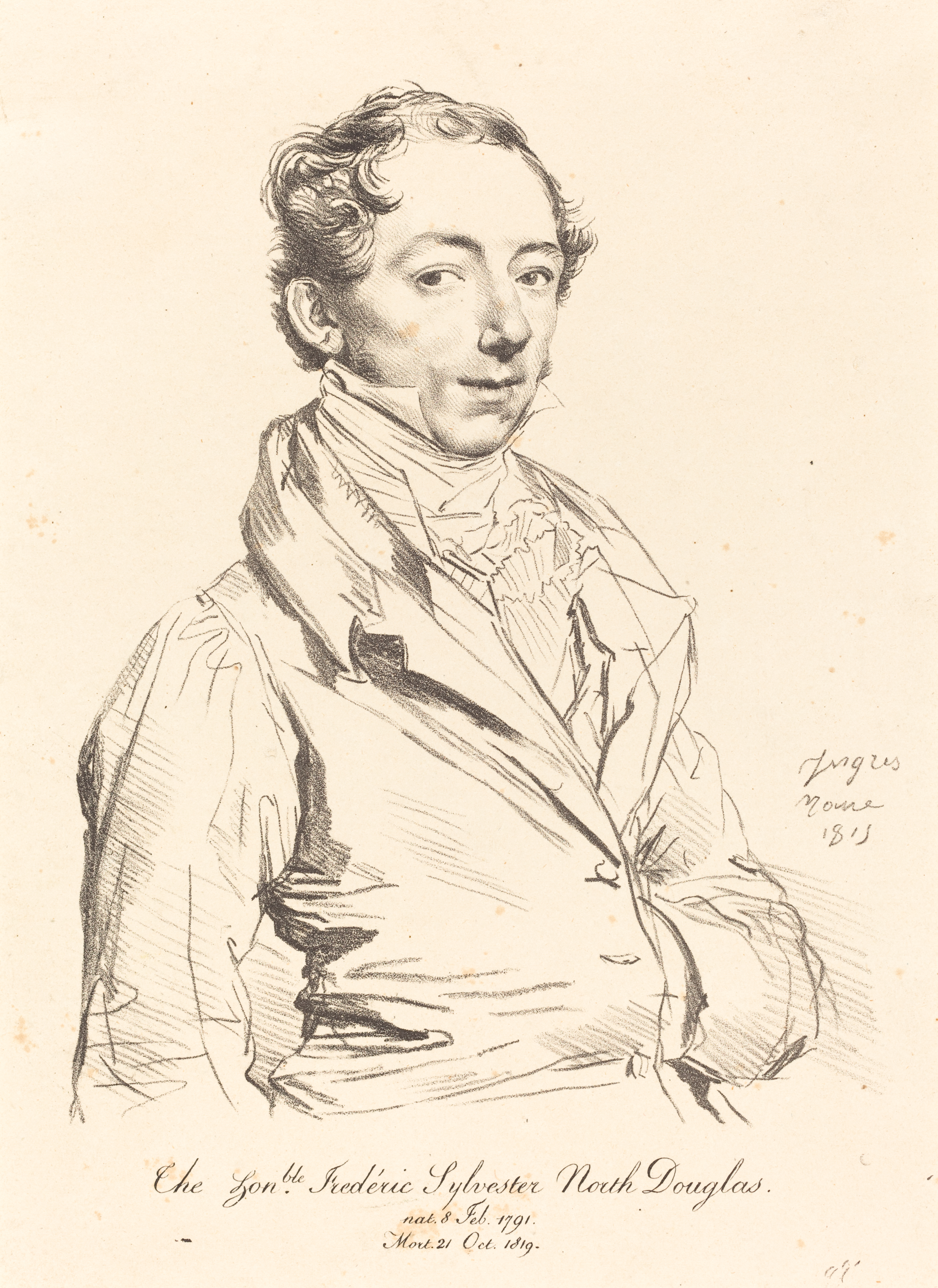
Portrait of Frederick Sylvester North Douglas by Jean-Auguste-Dominique Ingres (1815).

The Hon. Frederick Sylvester North Douglas FRS (8 February 1791 – 21 October 1819) was an English actuary and politician.

He was the oldest son of Sylvester Douglas, 1st Baron Glenbervie, and his wife Lady Catherine Anne North, daughter of Frederick North, Lord North (later 2nd Earl of Guilford), the Prime Minister.

He was educated at Westminster School, Christ Church, Oxford, and at Lincoln's Inn, before setting off on a grand tour from 1810 to 1812. On his return he wrote An Essay on Certain Points of Resemblance Between the Ancient and Modern Greeks.

He was elected at the 1812 general election as the Member of Parliament (MP) for Banbury, holding the seat until his death in 1819, aged 28.

He was elected a Fellow of the Royal Society in 1817.

== Works ==
- Douglas, Frederick Sylvester North (1813). An Essay on Certain Points of Resemblance Between the Ancient and Modern Greeks (2nd ed.). London.

Parliament of the United Kingdom
Preceded by Dudley Long North	Member of Parliament for Banbury; 1812 – 1819	Succeeded by Heneage Legge
