= Ionian Academy =

Former university in Corfu, Greece

Coordinates: 39°37′15″N 19°55′24″E

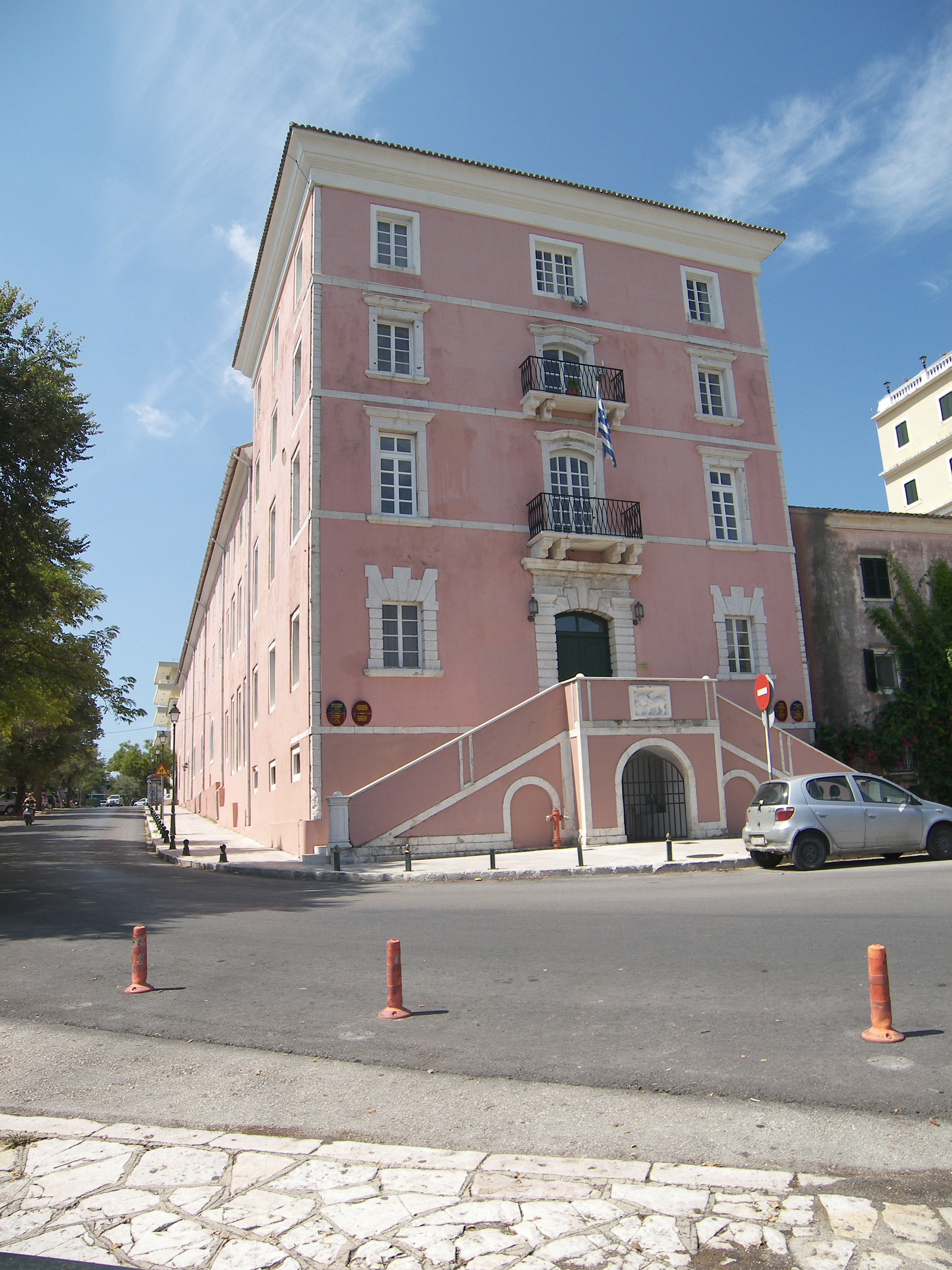
The building of the Ionian Academy. Fully restored after the WWII Luftwaffe bombings

The Ionian Academy (Greek: Ιόνιος Ακαδημία) was the first Greek academic institution established in modern times. It was located in Corfu. It was established by the French during their administration of the island as the département of Corcyre, and became a university during the British administration, through the actions of Frederick North, 5th Earl of Guilford in 1824. It is also considered the precursor of the Ionian University. It had Philological, Law, and Medical Schools.

The first period of existence of its Medical School was from 1824 to 1828. The second from 1844 to 1865 (when the Ionian islands united with Greece). Many of the physicians at the academy had followed the traditional path of studying in Italy, and in particular at the Medical School of Bologna. Their scientific and educational activities in establishing the high level of the Medical School influenced the Greek medical science as a whole. In particular, George Therianos (Prof of General and Comparative Anatomy and Experimental Physics) from the island of Zante (Zakynthos) met the Earl of Guilford in 1825 in England and was given the position of professor of the academy's Medical School.

Giovanni Carandino (Ioannis Karantinos), who had already learnt mathematics with Charles Dupin at the original Ionian Academy established by the French during their occupation of the Septinsular Republic (1807–1824), was sent by Lord Guilford to study at the École Polytechnique in Paris, France, in Italy and in England between 1820 and 1823, and became the director of the school of Mathematics at the academy.

The academy gave Public courses in Sciences, Ethics and humanities, it offered subjects like, Physiology, Botany, political economy and Penal and Civil law.

George Bowen was president of the Academy 1847-1851 and later first governor of Queensland.

After the union of the Ionian Islands to the Kingdom of Greece in 1864, the Ionian Academy was closed to support the newly established University of Athens. Parts of the staff moved to Athens and also the library was brought there.

== See also ==
- List of modern universities in Europe (1801–1945)
