= Giovanni Carandino =

Greek mathematician (1784–1834)

Giovanni Carandino, also known as Ioannis Karandinos (Greek: Ιωάννης Καραντηνός), and sometimes as Jean Carantino or John Carandino (1784–1834), was an ethnically Greek mathematician, founder of the Greek mathematics school, and translator into Greek of the major French works on analysis in the early 19th century.

== Education ==
He was born in 1784 in Cephalonia. studied mathematics during Cephalonia's occupation by the French in 1808, under the direction of Ecole polytechnique's alumnus Charles Dupin, a very good mathematician, who was a navy officer at that time. Then, under Lord North government on Ionian Islands, his talent was remarked and he was sent to study mathematics in Ecole polytechnique, under Biot, Cauchy, Poisson and Fourier. Then he went to England for a study trip, and went back to Corfu to establish the Ionian Academy, where he created the first course of modern mathematics in Greek language.

He made contributions to the formalisation of analysis, which were published in 1828 in the Journal des Savants.

He taught an entire generation of Greek mathematicians, and is thus seen as the founder of the modern Greek analysis school.

He died in 1834 in Naples.
