= Catherine Douglas, Baroness Glenbervie =

British courtier

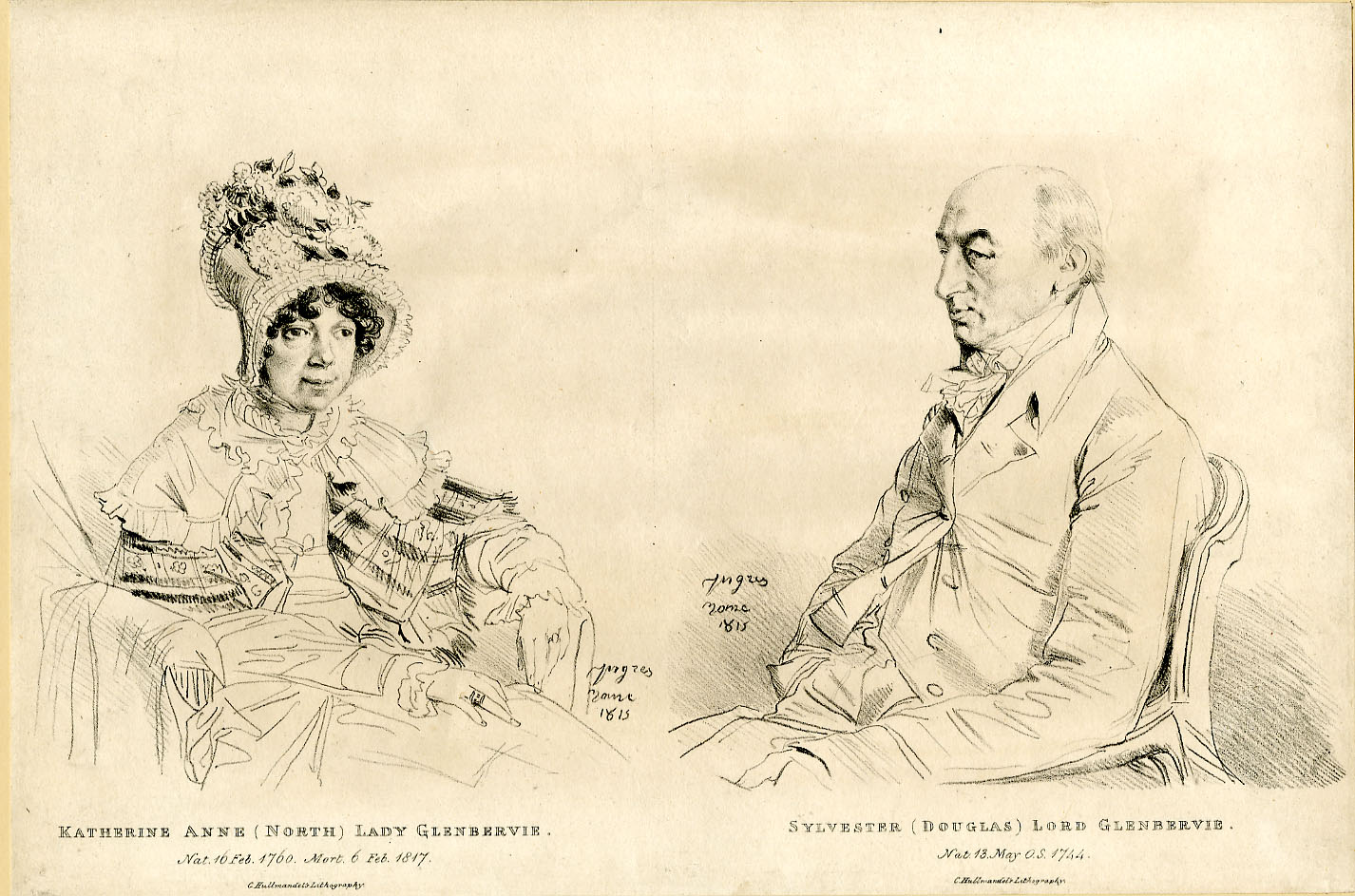
Portrait of Catherine Douglas, Baroness Glenbervie and Sylvester Douglas, Baron Glenbervie by Jean Auguste Dominique Ingres (1815).

Catherine Douglas, Baroness Glenbervie (née North; 16 February 1760 – 30 January 1817), formerly Lady Catherine Anne North, was the wife of Sylvester Douglas, 1st Baron Glenbervie.

She was the daughter of Frederick North, 2nd Earl of Guilford, and his wife Anne.

She married Baron Glenbervie in 1789, several years before his elevation to the peerage. They had one son, Frederick Sylvester North Douglas, who sat in Parliament for Banbury, holding the seat until his death in 1819, aged 28, a few months after marrying Harriet Wrightson. Between 1808 and 1817, Lady Glenbervie was officially Mistress of the Robes to Caroline of Brunswick, Princess of Wales; between 1814 and 1820, the princess was living abroad.

A drawing of Catherine, by Jean-Auguste-Dominique Ingres, is held by the Morgan Library and Museum.
