= Francis North, 2nd Baron Guilford =

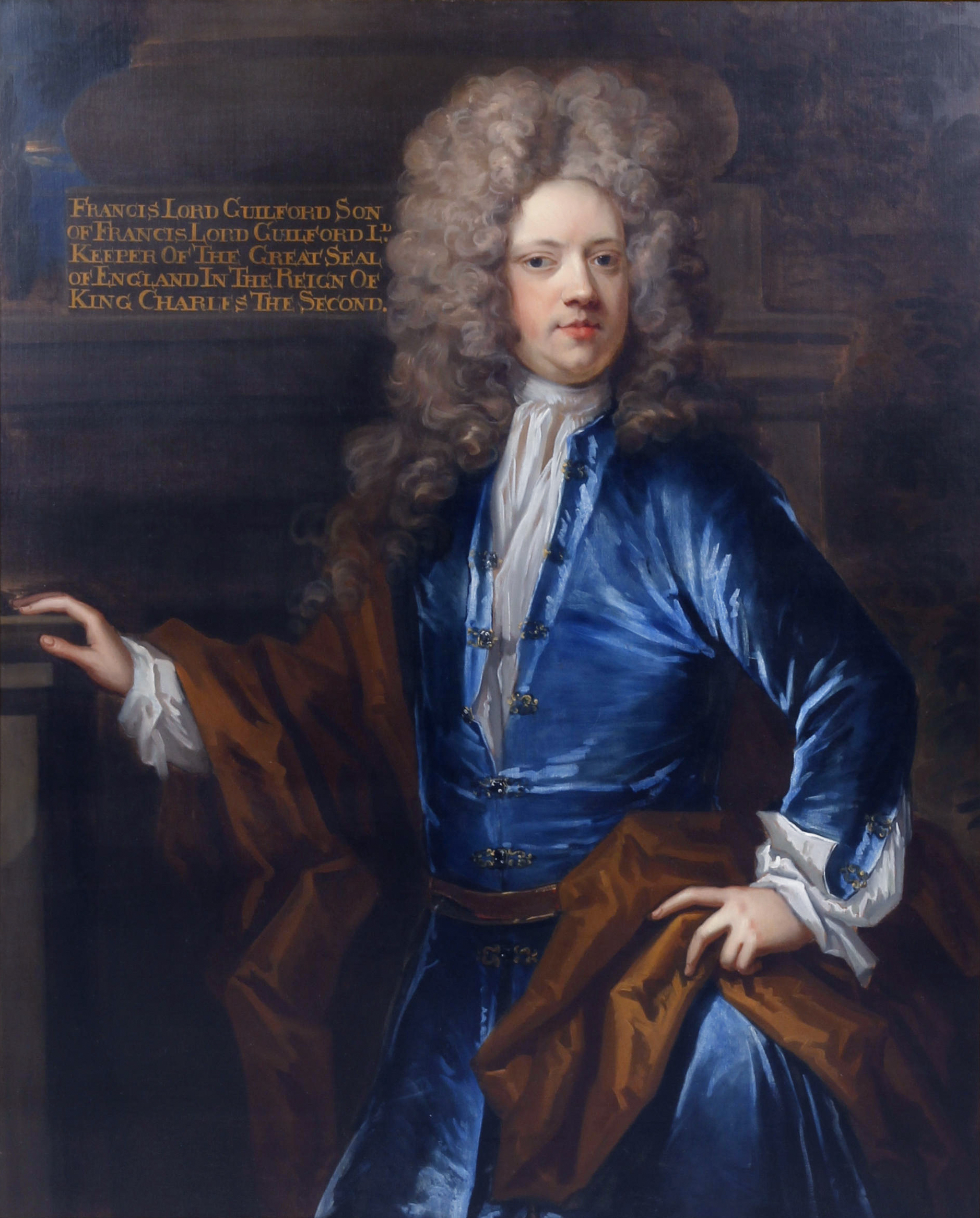
Portrait of Guilford

Francis North, 2nd Baron Guilford PC (14 December 1673 – 17 October 1729) was a British politician.

== Life ==
North went up to and matriculated at Trinity College, Oxford. In 1685, he succeeded his father Francis North as Baron Guilford. In 1701 he was one of five peers of the realm who voted against the Act of Settlement (which excluded the House of Stuart from the English throne) in the House of Lords, and who felt strongly enough to enter written protests in the House of Lords Journal. From 1703 to 1705, Guilford was Lord Lieutenant of Essex. In 1712, he was appointed to the Privy Council, and was First Lord of Trade from 1713 to 1714.

== Family ==
North was twice married. His first wife was Elizabeth, daughter of Fulke Greville, 5th Baron Brooke, and Sarah Dashwood, whom he married in 1695. His second wife was Alicia Brownlow, daughter of Sir John Brownlow, 3rd Baronet, and Alice Sherard, whom he married around 1703.

Guilford was succeeded by his son by his second wife Francis North, 3rd Baron Guilford, who later became 1st Earl of Guilford.

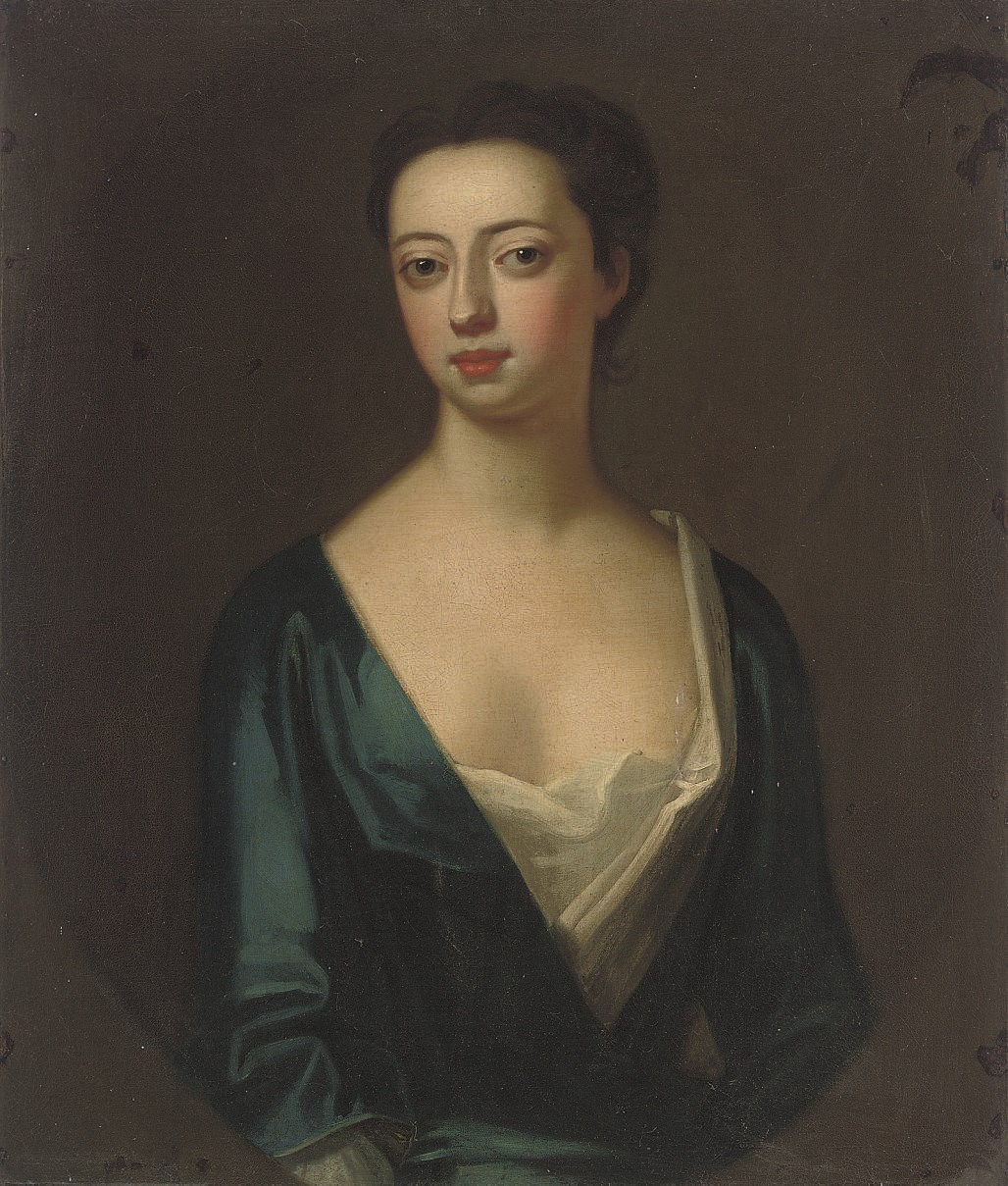
Portrait of a lady, traditionally identified as Elizabeth Greville, Lady Guilford, painting attributed to Enoch Seeman

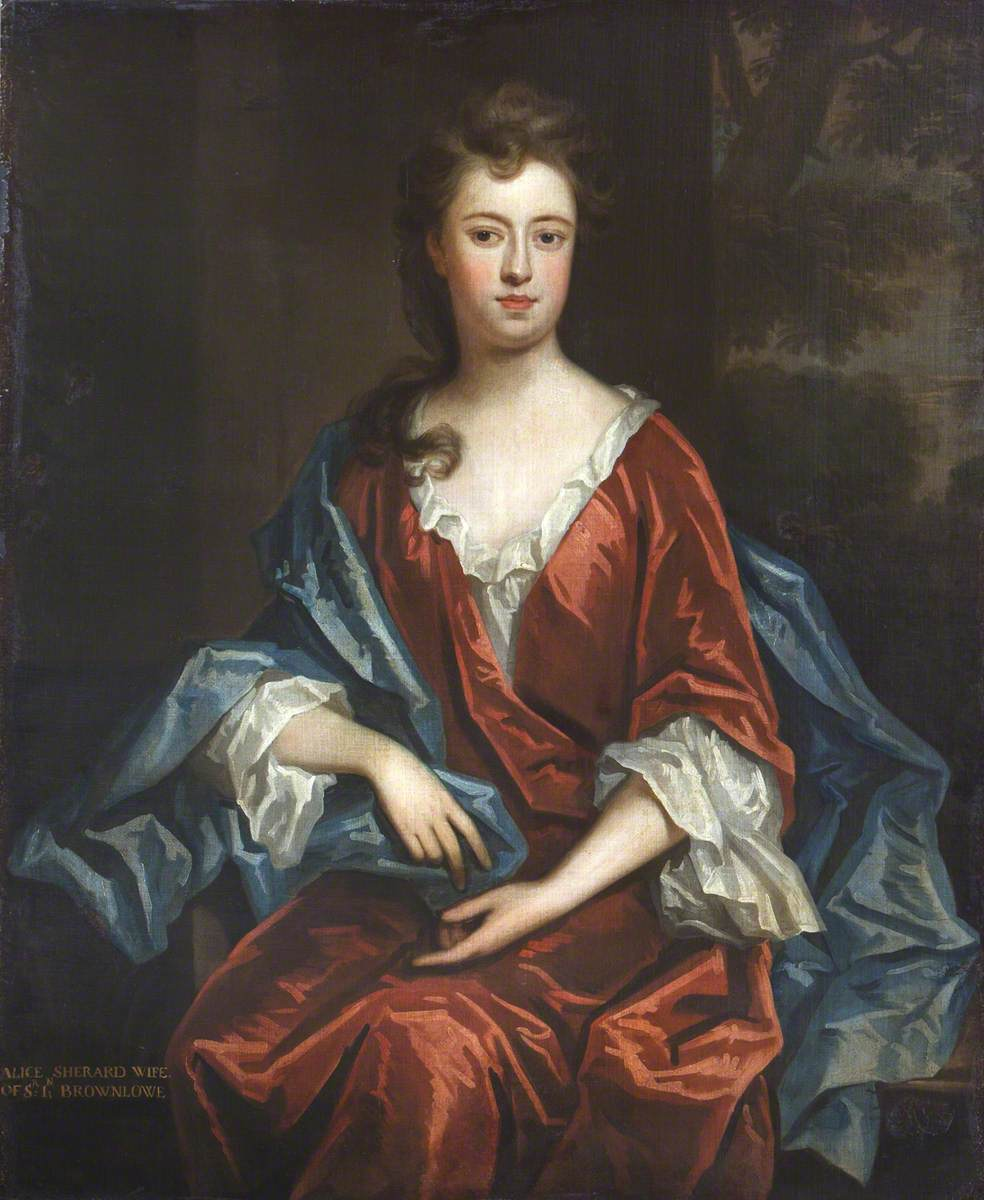
Alicia Brownlow (1684–1727),
painting by Charles d' Agar

Political offices
Preceded by The Earl of Winchilsea	First Lord of Trade; 1713–1714	Succeeded by The Lord Berkeley of Stratton
Honorary titles
Preceded by The Earl of Oxford	Lord Lieutenant of Essex; 1703–1705	Succeeded by The Earl Rivers
Peerage of England
Preceded by Francis North	Baron Guilford; 1685–1729	Succeeded by Francis North
