= Frederick North, 5th Earl of Guilford =

British politician and colonial administrator (1766–1827)

The Right Honourable The Earl of Guilford GCMG FRS
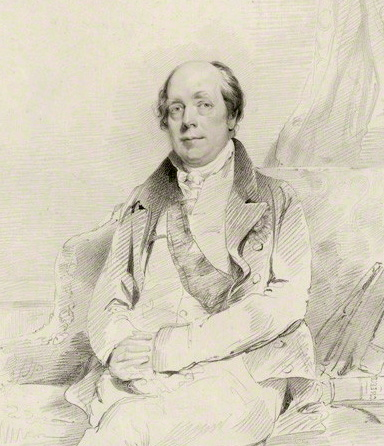

1st Governor of British Ceylon
- In office 12 October 1798 – 19 July 1805
- Monarch: George III
- Preceded by: Robert Andrews (as Resident and Superintendent of British Ceylon)
- Succeeded by: Thomas Maitland

Personal details
- Born: 7 February 1766
- Died: 14 October 1827 (aged 61)
- Parent(s): Frederick North, 2nd Earl of Guilford (father); Anne Speke (mother)

Frederick North, 5th Earl of Guilford, GCMG, FRS (7 February 1766 – 14 October 1827), styled The Honourable Frederick North until 1817, was a British politician and colonial administrator.

== Early life and education ==
North was a younger son of Prime Minister Frederick North, 2nd Earl of Guilford (usually referred to as Lord North). He was educated at Eton College (1775–82) and Christ Church, Oxford. In 1791, he converted to the Eastern Orthodox Church and became an ardent adherent. He was elected a Fellow of the Royal Society in 1794.

== Career ==
=== Parliament ===
He represented Banbury in Parliament from 1792 to 1794.

=== Secretary of State for Corsica ===
North served as Secretary of State to the Viceroy Sir Gilbert Elliot from 1794 to 1796 during the short-lived Anglo-Corsican Kingdom. North was tasked with the delicate negotiations with Pasquale Paoli and came to consider that Corsica was effectively 'ungovernable'.

=== Governor of Ceylon ===
He served as first British Governor of Ceylon from 1798 to 1805. North built his official residence, the Doric Bungalow, near the Mannar Sea according to his own plan; he himself used to supervise the pearl fishery, which at that time provided a substantial income for the British. In 1817, he succeeded his elder brother as fifth Earl of Guilford.

=== Ionian Academy ===
It is worthy of note that his father, Frederick North, was the Chancellor of the University of Oxford for twenty years, between 1772 and 1792. In 1824, North established the Ionian Academy on the island of Corfu, which was under British control as part of the United States of the Ionian Islands. This was the first University to be established in what, a few years later, would become modern Greece. In this context, he financed the studies in France (at Ecole polytechnique) of Giovanni Carandino, the founder of the modern Greek mathematics. The academy has now closed but a statue of the Earl stands on the island. A library and a street are also named after him.

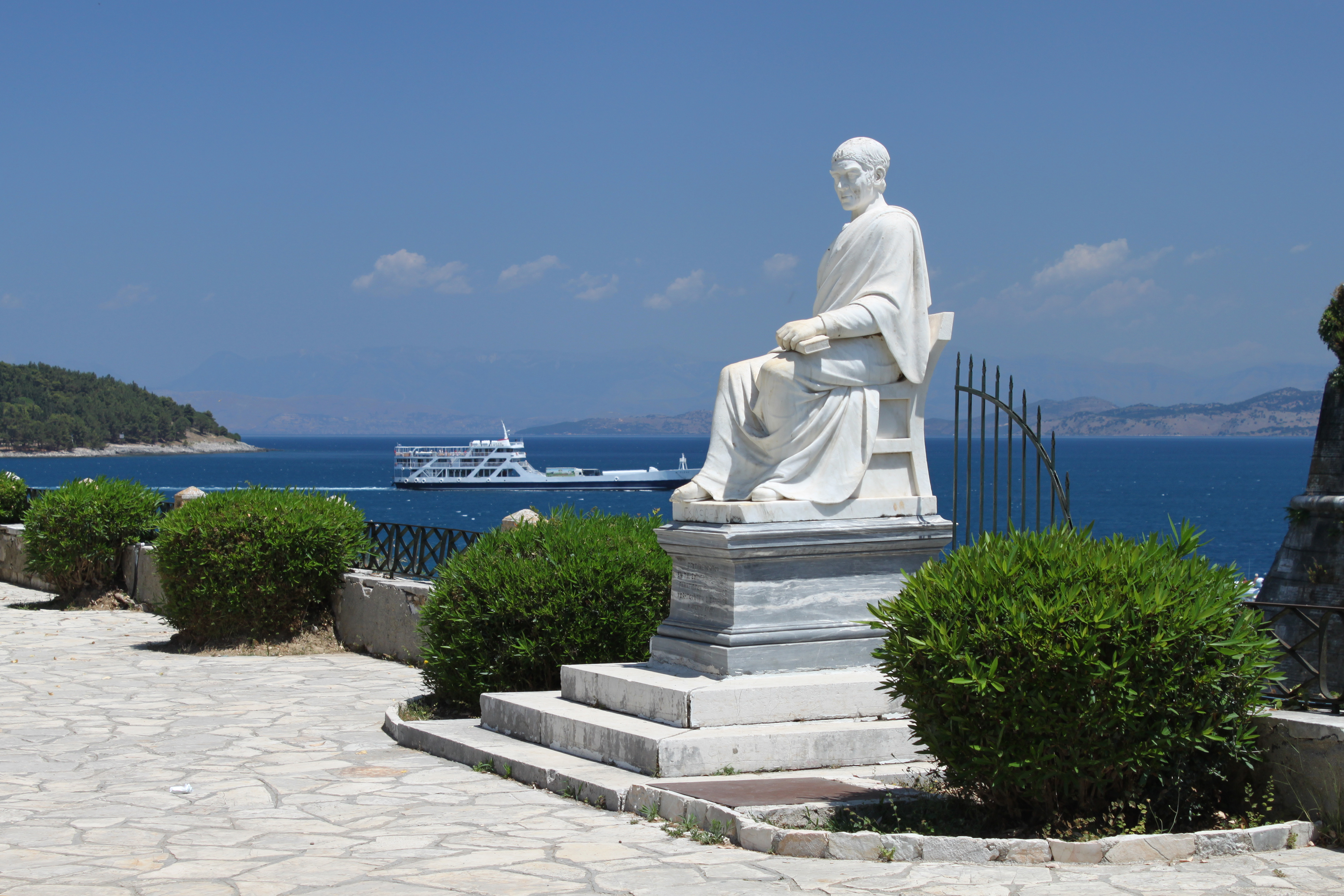
His statue in the Bosketo Garden, Corfu

== Death ==
Lord Guilford died unmarried in October 1827, aged 61, and was succeeded in his titles by his cousin, Francis North, 6th Earl of Guilford .

== Arms ==
Coat of arms of Frederick North, 5th Earl of Guilford
Crest A dragon's head erased sable ducally gorged and chained or. Escutcheon Azure, a lion passant or between three fleurs-de-lys argent. Supporters Two dragons sable ducally gorged and chained or. Motto La virtue eat la seule noblesse (Virtue is the only nobility) and Animo et fide (With courage and fidelity). Orders The Most Distinguished Order of St.Michael and St.George (Knight Grand Cross)

== Notes ==
Parliament of Great Britain
Preceded by Lord North	Member of Parliament for Banbury; 1792–1794	Succeeded by William Holbech
Government offices
Preceded by New office	Governor of Ceylon; 1798–1805	Succeeded by Thomas Maitland
Peerage of Great Britain
Preceded by Francis North	Earl of Guilford; 1817–1827	Succeeded by Francis North
