= George North, 3rd Earl of Guilford =

British politician (1757–1802)

The Right Honourable The Earl of Guilford FRS
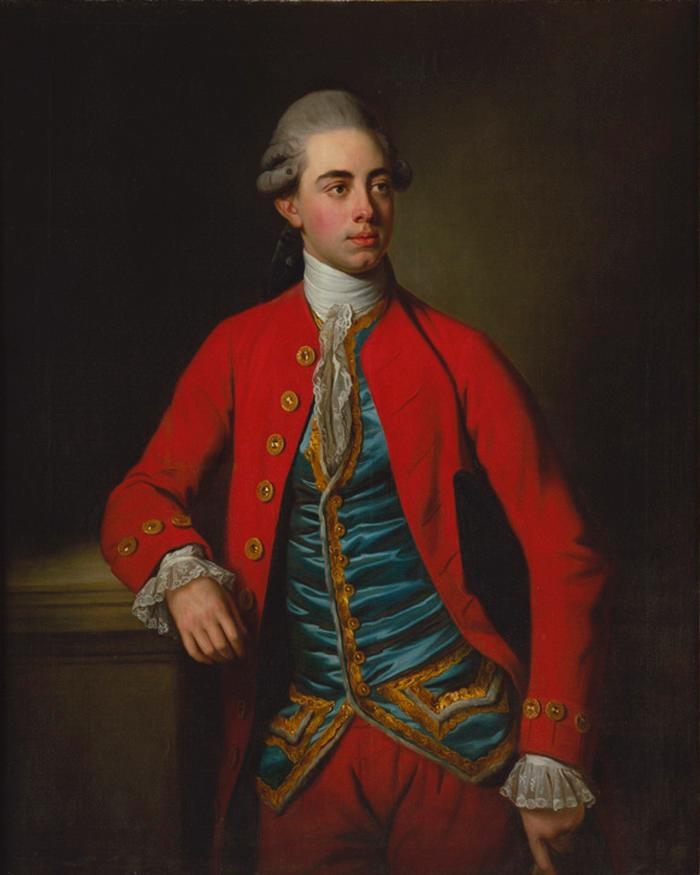
- Portrait by Sir Nathaniel Dance-Holland

Member of Parliament for Banbury
- In office 1790–1792
- Preceded by: Lord North
- Succeeded by: Frederick North

Member of Parliament for Petersfield
- In office 1790–1790 Serving with William Jolliffe
- Preceded by: William Jolliffe; The Viscount Downe
- Succeeded by: William Jolliffe; Marquess of Titchfield

Member of Parliament for Wootton Bassett
- In office 1784–1790 Serving with Robert Seymour Conway
- Preceded by: Henry St John; William Strahan
- Succeeded by: John Thomas Stanley; The Viscount Downe

Member of Parliament for Harwich
- In office 1778–1784 Serving with John Robinson
- Preceded by: Edward Harvey; John Robinson
- Succeeded by: John Robinson; Thomas Orde

Personal details
- Born: George Augustus North; 11 September 1757
- Died: 20 April 1802 (aged 44)
- Spouses: Lady Maria Frances Mary Hobart (m. 1785; died 1794) Susan Coutts (m. 1796)
- Children: 3
- Parent(s): Frederick North, 2nd Earl of Guilford; Anne Speke

George Augustus North, 3rd Earl of Guilford, FRS (11 September 1757 – 20 April 1802), known as The Honourable George North until 1790 and as Lord North from 1790 to 1792, was a British politician.

== Early life ==
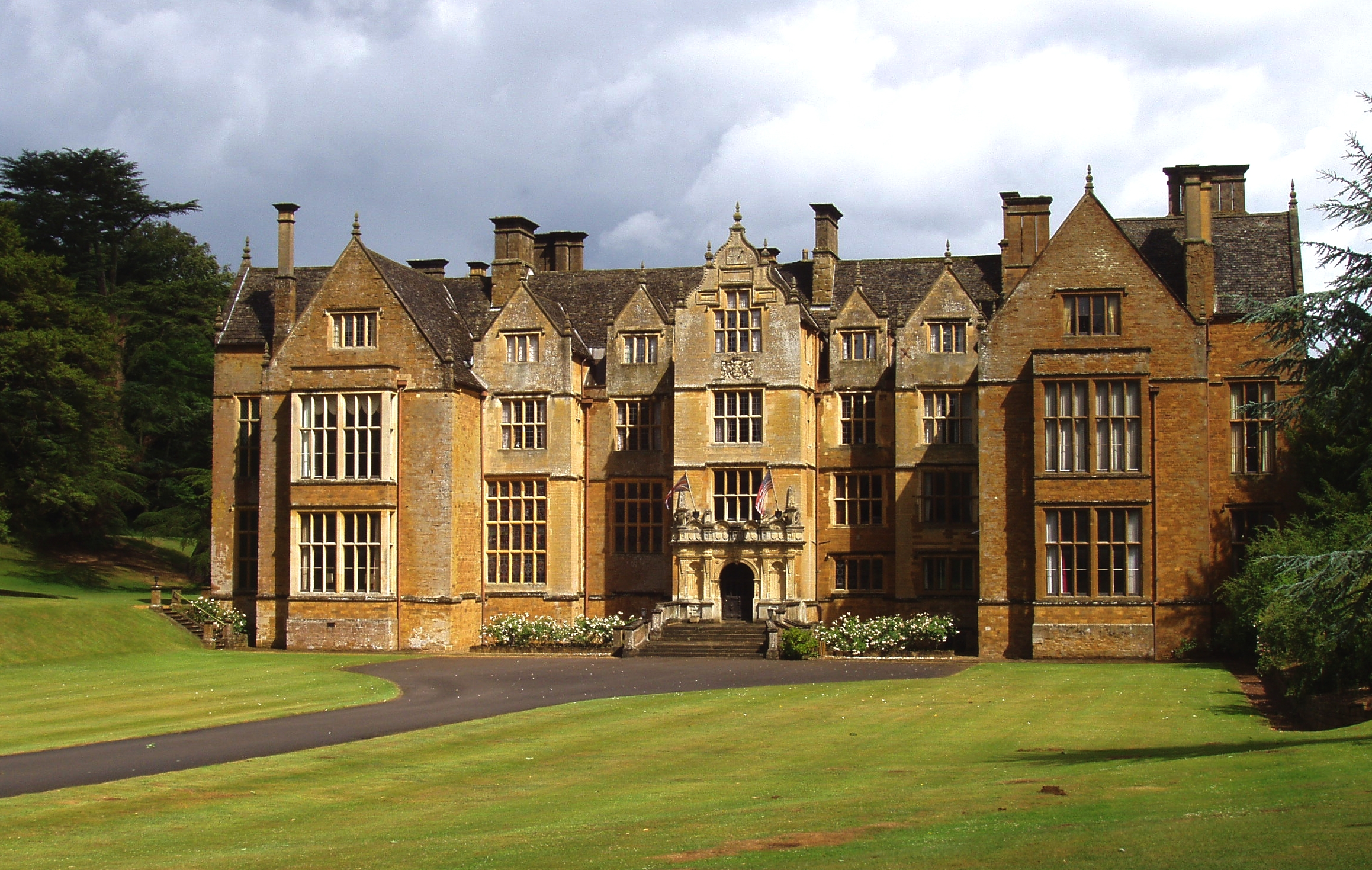
Wroxton Abbey.

Guilford was the eldest son of Frederick North, 2nd Earl of Guilford (commonly known as Lord North) who served as Prime Minister of Great Britain from 1770 to 1782, and his wife Anne (née Speke), Ranger of Bushy Park from 1771 to 1797. Among his siblings were Francis North (later the 4th Earl), Catherine Anne North (wife of Sylvester Douglas, 1st Baron Glenbervie), Lady Charlotte North (wife of Lt.-Col. John Lindsay, a son of the 5th Earl of Balcarres), Frederick North (later the 5th Earl), and Lady Anne North (wife of John Baker-Holroyd, 1st Earl of Sheffield).

His paternal grandfather was Francis North, 1st Earl of Guilford. His mother was the daughter and heiress of George Speke of White Lackington, by his third wife Anne Peer-Williams (a daughter of William Peer-Williams).

North was educated at Trinity College, Oxford, matriculating in 1774, graduating with a nobleman's M.A. in 1777.

== Career ==
He was elected to the House of Commons for Harwich in 1778, a seat he held until 1784, and then represented Wootton Bassett from 1784 to 1790, Petersfield in 1790 and Banbury from 1790 to 1792.

In the latter year, he succeeded his father in the earldom and entered the House of Lords. He was a supporter of his father's policies during the American War of Independence which came under attack from all sides. He was given the honorary post of Captain of Deal Castle in 1786, which he held until his death. He was elected a Fellow of the Royal Society in 1782.

== Personal life ==
Lord Guilford married firstly Lady Maria Frances Mary Hobart, daughter of George Hobart, 3rd Earl of Buckinghamshire, on 24 September 1785. Before her death on 23 April 1794, they were the parents of one child, a daughter:

- Lady Maria North (1793–1841), who married, as his first wife, John Crichton-Stuart, 2nd Marquess of Bute, in 1818.

After Lady Maria's death, North remarried on 28 February 1796 to Susan, daughter of Thomas Coutts, founder of the banking house of Coutts & Co. with his brother, James Coutts, MP for Edinburgh. Together, they were the parents of:

- Lady Susan North (1797–1884), later suo jure Baroness North.
- Lady Georgiana North (d. 1835), who died unmarried.

It was while courting his second wife that Guilford sustained a spinal injury in a fall from his horse and died from a lingering illness that resulted in April 1802, aged 44. He was buried at Wroxton in Oxfordshire. On his death his junior title of Baron North fell into abeyance between his daughters while he was succeeded in the earldom by his younger brother, Francis.

Guilford's son-in-law, the Marquess of Bute, brought a petition to the House of Lords to resolve the partition of the late Earl's estate between his widow and his daughters. This was finally enacted by William IV in October 1831. The Countess of Guilford died in 1837.

== Arms ==
Coat of arms of North, Earls of Guilford (early earls)
| Crest A dragon's head erased sable ducally gorged and chained or. Escutcheon Azure, a lion passant or between three fleurs-de-lys argent. Supporters Two dragons sable ducally gorged and chained or. Motto La virtue eat la seule noblesse (Virtue is the only nobility) and Animo et fide (With courage and fidelity). |

== Notes ==
Parliament of Great Britain
| Preceded by Edward Harvey; John Robinson | Member of Parliament for Harwich; 1778–1784; With: John Robinson | Succeeded by John Robinson; Thomas Orde |
| Preceded by Henry St John; William Strahan | Member of Parliament for Wootton Bassett; 1784–1790; With: Robert Seymour Conway | Succeeded by John Thomas Stanley; The Viscount Downe |
| Preceded by William Jolliffe; The Viscount Downe | Member of Parliament for Petersfield; 1790; With: William Jolliffe | Succeeded by William Jolliffe; Marquess of Titchfield |
| Preceded by Lord North | Member of Parliament for Banbury; 1790–1792 | Succeeded by Frederick North |
Court offices
| Preceded by James Harris | Secretary and Comptroller to Queen Charlotte; 1780–1784 | Succeeded by Richard Howard |
Peerage of Great Britain
| Preceded by Frederick North | Earl of Guilford; 1792–1802 | Succeeded by Francis North |
Peerage of England
| Preceded by Frederick North | Baron North; 1792–1802 | Succeeded by Abeyant, finally terminated in favour of Susan North, 10th Baroness North in 1841, again abeyant since 1941 after the death of the 13th Baron. |
