= Francis North, 4th Earl of Guilford =

British Army officer and playwright

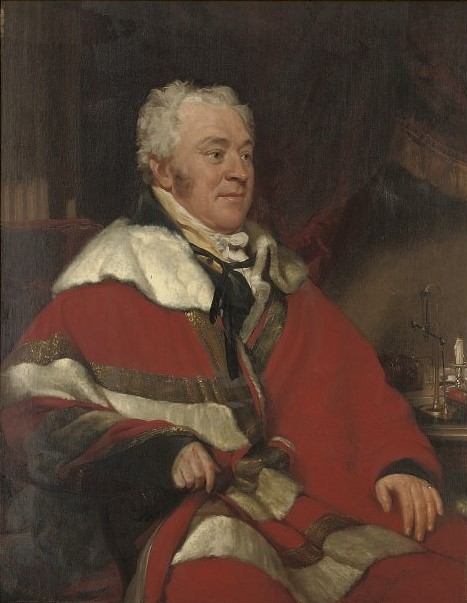
Portrait of Francis North, 4th Earl of Guilford painted by Ramsay Richard Reinagle

Francis North, 4th Earl of Guilford (25 December 1761 – 11 January 1817), styled The Honourable Francis North until 1802, was a British Army officer and playwright.

North was the second son of Frederick North, 2nd Earl of Guilford and his wife Anne. On 8 July 1777, he was commissioned an ensign in the 58th (Rutlandshire) Regiment of Foot. On 27 January 1778, he became a cornet in the 2nd Dragoons, and in December 1778 or May 1779 was promoted lieutenant in the 2nd Dragoon Guards. On 29 April 1780, he became a captain in the 96th Regiment of Foot.

Capt. North was appointed aide-de-camp in extraordinary to Frederick Howard, 5th Earl of Carlisle, the new Lord Lieutenant of Ireland, on 30 December 1780, a post he held for the duration of Carlisle's tenure in office. On 9 April 1781, he exchanged into the 49th Regiment of Foot. On 22 April 1783, he was promoted major in the 83rd Regiment of Foot, which regiment, however, was disbanded the following year.

North was also a playwright, and his drama, The Kentish Baron, was produced at the Haymarket in 1791 and deemed a success. On 9 September 1794, he was promoted to lieutenant-colonel. He was appointed lieutenant of Dover Castle in 1795 and captain of Deal Castle in 1799, succeeding his elder brother George North, 3rd Earl of Guilford in 1802. On 5 May 1803, he was appointed a deputy lieutenant of Kent.

He married Maria Boycott on 19 July 1810, but had no children by her. Upon his death in 1817 in Pisa, he was succeeded in the earldom by his brother, Frederick North, 5th Earl of Guilford.

== Arms ==
Coat of arms of North, Earls of Guilford (early earls)
Crest A dragon's head erased sable ducally gorged and chained or. Escutcheon Azure, a lion passant or between three fleurs-de-lys argent. Supporters Two dragons sable ducally gorged and chained or. Motto La virtue eat la seule noblesse (Virtue is the only nobility) and Animo et fide (With courage and fidelity).

Peerage of Great Britain
Preceded by George Augustus North	Earl of Guilford; 1802–1817	Succeeded by Frederick North
