= Frederick North, Lord North =

Prime Minister of Great Britain from 1770 to 1782

The Right Honourable The Earl of Guilford KG PC
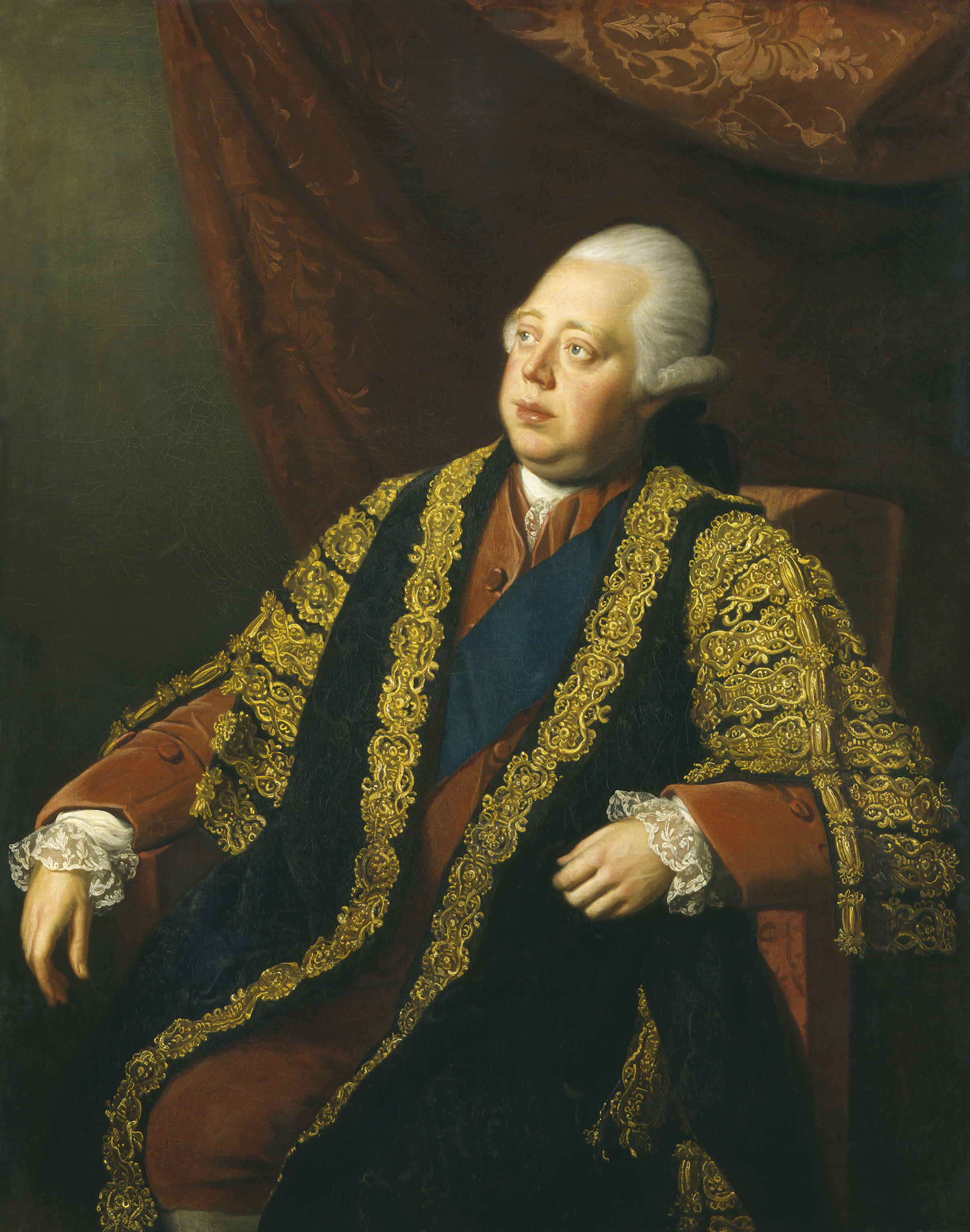
- Portrait, c. 1773–1774

Prime Minister of Great Britain
- In office 28 January 1770 – 27 March 1782
- Monarch: George III
- Preceded by: The Duke of Grafton
- Succeeded by: The Marquess of Rockingham
Ministerial offices
Home Secretary
In office 2 April 1783 – 19 December 1783
| Prime Minister | The Duke of Portland |
| Preceded by | Thomas Townshend |
| Succeeded by | The Earl Temple |
Chancellor of the Exchequer
In office 11 September 1767 – 27 March 1782
| Prime Minister | The Earl of Chatham; The Duke of Grafton; Himself |
| Preceded by | Charles Townshend |
| Succeeded by | Lord John Cavendish |
Paymaster of the Forces
In office 21 August 1766 – 9 December 1767 Serving with George Cooke
| Prime Minister | The Earl of Chatham |
| Preceded by | Charles Townshend |
| Succeeded by | Thomas Townshend |
Lord Commissioner of the Treasury
In office 2 June 1759 – 10 July 1865
| Prime Minister | The Duke of Newcastle; The Earl of Bute; George Grenville |
| Preceded by | The Earl of Bessborough |
Parliamentary offices
Leader of the House of Commons
In office 2 April 1783 – 19 December 1783 Serving with Charles James Fox
| Prime Minister | The Duke of Portland |
| Preceded by | Thomas Townshend |
| Succeeded by | William Pitt the Younger |
In office 20 January 1768 – 27 March 1782
| Prime Minister | The Earl of Chatham; The Duke of Grafton; Himself |
| Preceded by | Henry Seymour Conway |
| Succeeded by | Charles James Fox |
Member of Parliament for Banbury
In office 20 May 1754 – 4 August 1790
| Preceded by | John Willes |
| Succeeded by | George North, Lord North |

Personal details
- Born: 13 April 1732 Piccadilly, London, England
- Died: 5 August 1792 (aged 60) Mayfair, London, England
- Resting place: All Saints' Church, Wroxton, England
- Party: Whig (1754–1770); Tory (1770–1790)
- Spouse: Anne Speke (m. 1756)
- Children: 7, including George, Francis and Frederick
- Parent: Francis North, 1st Earl of Guilford (father)
- Education: Trinity College, Oxford

Frederick North, 2nd Earl of Guilford (13 April 1732 – 5 August 1792), (Note: North's birth date is recorded under the Old Style Julian calendar, which was used in Great Britain and Ireland until the adoption of the New Style Gregorian calendar on 14 September 1752. The reform moved the calendar 11 days ahead and set the year beginning to 1 January from 25 March.) styled The Honourable Frederick North before 1752 and Lord North between 1752 and 1790, being best known to history by the latter title, was a British statesman who served as Prime Minister of Great Britain from 1770 to 1782. Aligned with the Whigs from 1754, he had developed strong Tory sympathies by the time he became Chancellor of the Exchequer in 1767. North is most often remembered for losing the 13 colonies in the American Revolutionary War. The war ended in 1783 with the Treaty of Paris, as part of which Britain recognised American independence.

North's reputation among historians has varied wildly, reaching its lowest point in the late 19th century, when he was depicted as a creature of King George III and an incompetent who lost the American colonies. In the early 20th century a revised view emerged which emphasised his strengths in administering the Treasury, handling the House of Commons, and in defending the Church of England. The historian Herbert Butterfield, however, argued that his indolence was a barrier to efficient crisis management; he neglected his role in supervising the entire war effort.

== Early life ==
=== Birth and family ===
Frederick North was born in London on 13 April 1732 at the family house at Albemarle Street, just off Piccadilly. He spent much of his youth at Wroxton Abbey in Oxfordshire. North's strong resemblance to King George III suggested to contemporaries that George III's father, Frederick, Prince of Wales, might have been North's real father, making North the king's half-brother, a theory compatible with the prince's reputation but supported by little else other than the circumstantial evidence.

King George IV remarked that "either his royal grandfather or North's mother must have played her husband false", North's father, Francis North, 1st Earl of Guilford, was from 1730 to 1751 Lord of the Bedchamber to Frederick, Prince of Wales, who stood as godfather to the infant, christened Frederick, possibly in honour of his real father.

North was descended from Henry Montagu, 1st Earl of Manchester, paternal uncle of Edward Montagu, 1st Earl of Sandwich and was related to Samuel Pepys and the 3rd Earl of Bute. He at times had a slightly turbulent relationship with his father, Francis, yet they were very close. In his early years the family were not wealthy, though their situation improved in 1735 when his father inherited property from his cousin.

Frederick's mother, Lady Lucy Montagu, a daughter of George Montagu, 1st Earl of Halifax, and his first wife, Ricarda Posthuma Saltonstall, died in 1734. His father remarried, but his stepmother, Elizabeth Kaye, widow of George Legge, Viscount Lewisham, eldest son of William Legge, 1st Earl of Dartmouth and his wife, Lady Anne Finch, third daughter of Heneage Finch, 1st Earl of Aylesford, died in 1745, when Frederick was thirteen. One of his stepbrothers was William Legge, 2nd Earl of Dartmouth, who remained a close friend for life.

=== Education ===
He was educated at Eton College between 1742 and 1748 and at Trinity College, Oxford, where in 1750 he was awarded an MA. After leaving the University of Oxford he travelled in Europe on a Grand Tour with Lord Dartmouth. They stayed in Leipzig for nearly nine months, studying under Leipzig University professor of constitutional law Johann Jacob Mascov. They continued through Austria and Italy, staying in Rome from December 1752 to Easter 1753, then through Switzerland to Paris, returning to England in early 1754.

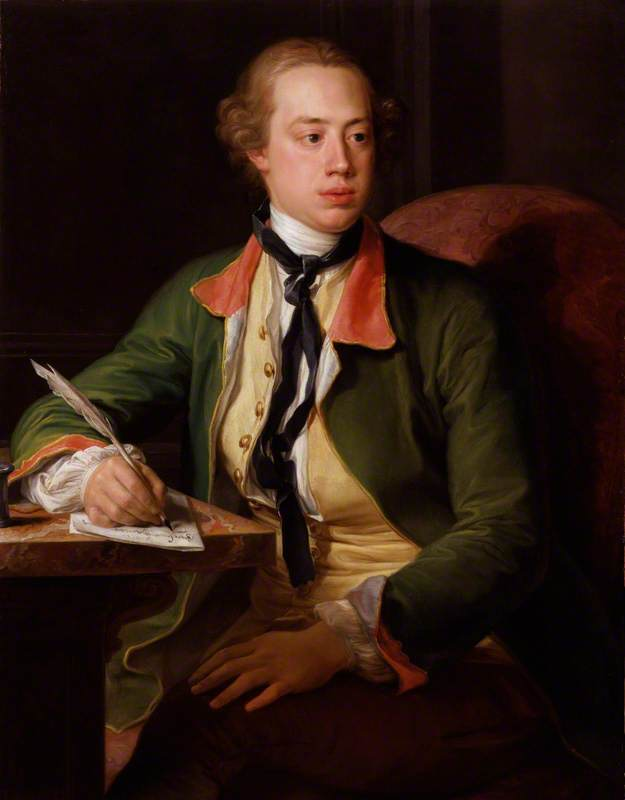
Portrait of Lord North by Pompeo Batoni (1753)

== Early political career ==
=== Member of Parliament ===
On 15 April 1754 North, then 22, was elected unopposed as the member of Parliament for Banbury. He served as an MP from 1754 to 1790 and joined the government as a junior Lord of the Treasury on 2 June 1759 during the Pitt–Newcastle ministry (an alliance between the Duke of Newcastle and William Pitt the Elder). He soon developed a reputation as a good administrator and parliamentarian and was generally liked by his colleagues. Although he initially considered himself a Whig, he did not closely align with any of the Whig factions in Parliament, and it became obvious to many contemporaries that his sympathies were largely Tory.

He was appointed Lieutenant-Colonel of the 1st Somerset Militia on 23 June 1759 when it was embodied for fulltime service, and commanded it in the West Country for Earl Poulett, the colonel, who was also Lord Lieutenant of Somerset. However, North resigned in November 1761 and concentrated on his political career.

In November 1763, he was chosen to speak for the government concerning the radical MP John Wilkes. Wilkes had made a savage attack on both the prime minister and the King in his newspaper The North Briton, which many thought libellous. North's motion for Wilkes to be expelled from the House of Commons passed by 273 votes to 111. Wilkes' expulsion took place in his absence, as he had already fled to France following a duel.

=== In government ===
When a government headed by the Whig magnate Charles Watson-Wentworth, Lord Rockingham, came to power in 1765, North left his post and served for a time as a backbench MP. He turned down an offer by Rockingham to rejoin the government, not wanting to be associated with the Whig grandees that dominated the Ministry.

He returned to office when Pitt returned to head a second government in 1766. North was appointed Joint Paymaster of the Forces in Pitt's ministry and became a Privy Counsellor. As Pitt was constantly ill, the government was effectively run by Augustus FitzRoy, 3rd Duke of Grafton, with North as one of its most senior members.

In December 1767 he succeeded Charles Townshend as Chancellor of the Exchequer. With the resignation of the secretary of state Henry Seymour Conway in early 1768, North became Leader of the Commons as well. He continued to serve when Pitt was succeeded by Grafton in October.

== Premiership ==
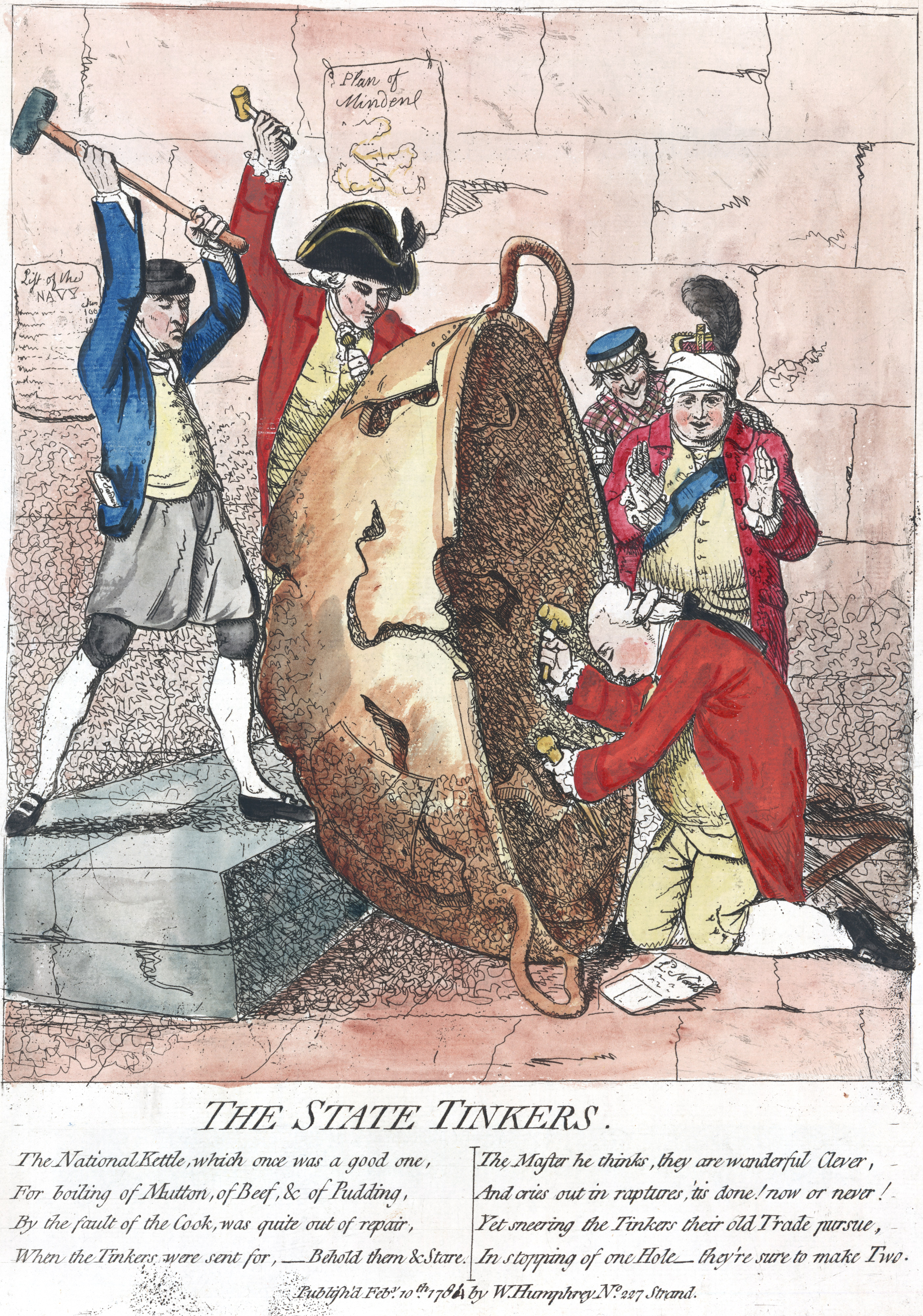
In The State Tinkers (1780), James Gillray caricatured North (on his knees) and his allies as incompetent tinkers of the National Kettle. George III cries out in rapture in the rear.

=== Appointment ===
When the Duke of Grafton resigned as Prime Minister, North formed a government on 28 January 1770. His ministers and supporters tended to be known as Tories, though they were not a formal grouping and many had previously been Whigs. He took over with Great Britain in a triumphant state following the Seven Years' War, which had seen the First British Empire expand to a peak by taking in vast new territories on several continents. Circumstances forced him to keep many members of the previous cabinet in their jobs, despite their lack of agreement with him. In contrast to many of his predecessors, North enjoyed a good relationship with George III, partly based on their shared patriotism and desire for decency in their private lives.

=== Falklands Crisis ===
North's ministry had an early challenge with the Falklands Crisis in 1770. Great Britain faced a Spanish attempt to remove the British settlement at Port Egmont on the Falkland Islands, nearly provoking a war. Both France and Spain had been left unhappy by Great Britain's perceived dominance following the British victory in the Seven Years' War. Spanish forces seized the British settlement on the Falklands and expelled the small British garrison. When Britain opposed the seizure, Spain sought backing from her ally France which King Louis XV of France was reluctant to give. The Spanish then chose to reach a negotiated settlement with the British. Louis also dismissed the Duc de Choiseul, the hawkish Chief Minister of France, who had advocated war and a large invasion of Great Britain by the French.

=== American War of Independence ===
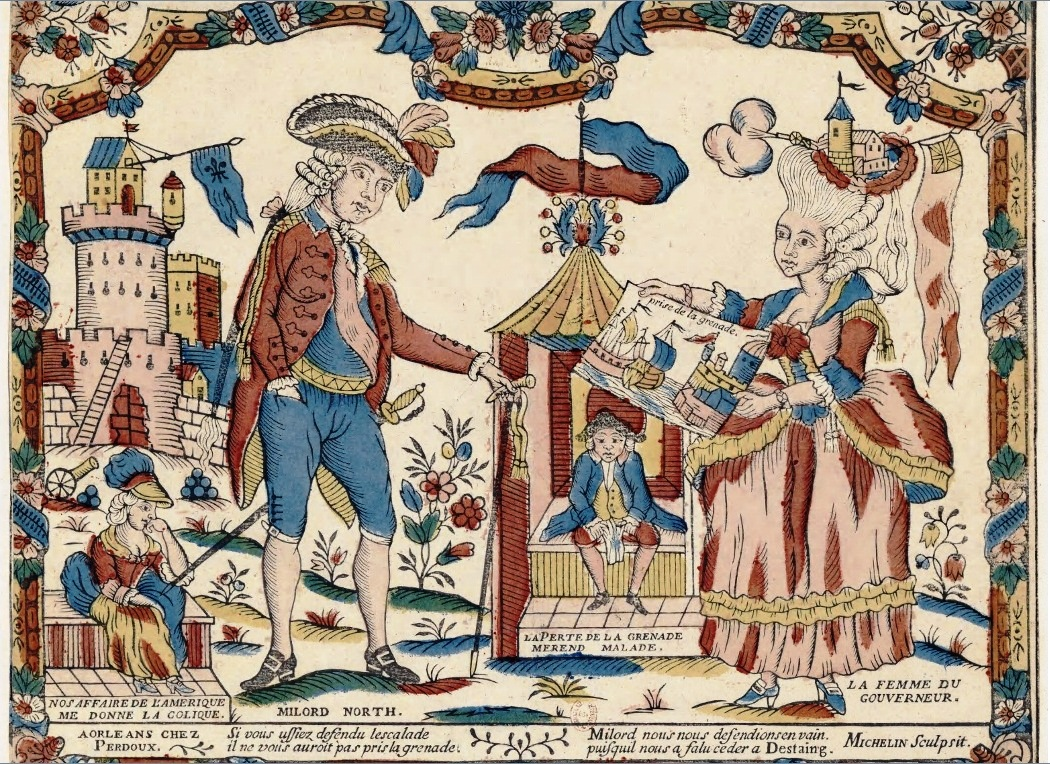
French caricature on the government of Frederick North after the defeat of Grenada (1779).

Most of North's government was focused first on the growing problems with the American colonies. Later on, it was preoccupied with conducting the American War of Independence that broke out in 1775 with the Battle of Lexington. Following the Boston Tea Party in 1773, Lord North proposed a number of legislative measures that were supposed to punish the Bostonians. These measures were known as the Coercive Acts in Great Britain, while dubbed the Intolerable Acts in the colonies. By shutting down the Boston government and cutting off trade, he hoped they would keep the peace and dispirit the rebellious colonists. Instead, the acts further inflamed Massachusetts and the other colonies, eventually resulting in open war during the Boston campaign of 1775–76.

North delegated the overall strategy of the war to his key subordinates Lord George Germain and the Earl of Sandwich. Despite a series of victories and the capture of New York and Philadelphia, the British were unable to secure a decisive victory. In 1778 the French allied themselves with the American rebels, and Spain joined the war in 1779 as an ally of France, followed by the Dutch Republic in 1780. The British found themselves fighting a global war on four continents without a single ally. After 1778 the British switched the focus of their efforts to the defence of the West Indies, as their sugar wealth made them much more valuable to Great Britain than the Thirteen Colonies. In 1779 Great Britain was faced with the prospect of a major Franco-Spanish invasion, but the Armada of 1779 was ultimately a failure. Several peace initiatives fell through, and an attempt by Richard Cumberland to negotiate a separate peace with Spain ended in frustration.

The country's problems were augmented by the First League of Armed Neutrality, which was formed to counter the British blockade strategy, and threatened British naval supplies from the Baltic. With severe manpower shortages, North's government passed an act abandoning previous statutes placing restrictions on Catholics serving in the military. This provoked an upsurge of anti-Catholic feelings and the formation of the Protestant Association that led to the Gordon Riots in London in June 1780. For around a week, the city was in the control of the mob until the military was called out and martial law imposed. Public opinion, especially in middle-class and elite circles, repudiated anti-Catholicism and violence, and rallied behind the North government. Demands were made for a London police force.

Britain's fortunes in the war in America had temporarily improved following the failure of a Franco-American attack on Newport and the prosecution of a Southern strategy that saw the capture of Charleston, South Carolina and its garrison. During 1780 and 1781, the North government gained strength in the House of Commons. In October 1781, a British army under Lord Cornwallis surrendered at the conclusion of the siege of Yorktown. When the news reached North, he took it "as he would have taken a ball in his breast", and exclaimed repeatedly "Oh God! It is all over!"

=== Resignation ===
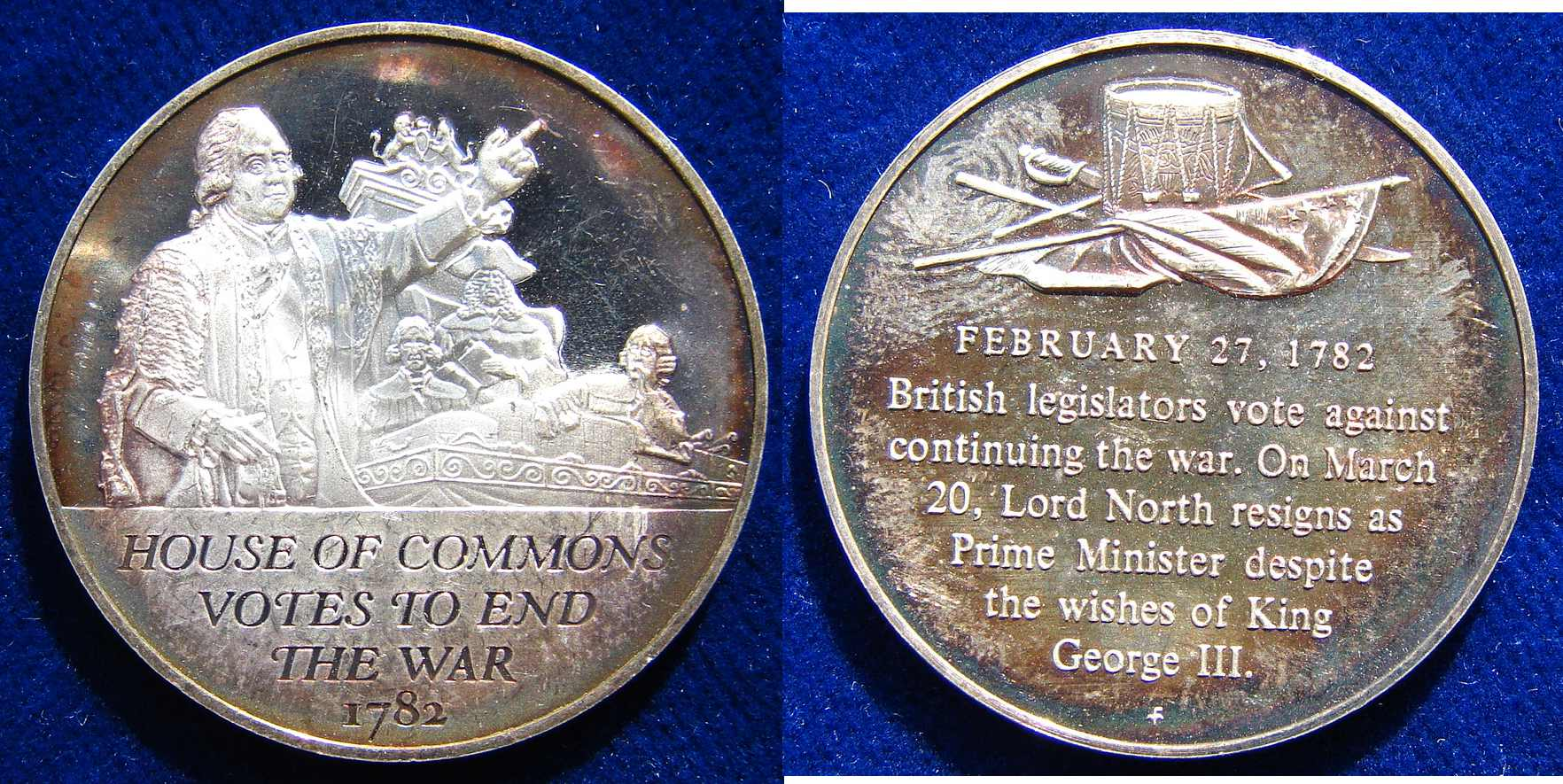
This modern American silver medallion commemorates the motion of no confidence against North on 27 February 1782 to end the American War of Independence. North resigned a month later.

North was the second British prime minister to be forced out of office by a motion of no confidence; the first was Sir Robert Walpole in 1742. North resigned on 20 March 1782 on account of the British defeat at Yorktown the year before. In an attempt to end the war, he proposed the Conciliation Plan, in which he promised that Great Britain would eliminate all disagreeable acts if the colonies ended the war. The colonies rejected the plan, as their goal had become full independence.

In April 1782 it was suggested in cabinet by Lord Shelburne that North should be brought to public trial for his conduct of the American War, but the prospect was soon abandoned. Ironically, the war began to turn in Great Britain's favour again in 1782 through naval victories, owing largely to policies adopted by Lord North and the Earl of Sandwich.

The British naval victory at the Battle of the Saintes took place after the government's fall. Despite predictions that Gibraltar's fall was imminent, that fortress managed to hold out and was relieved. Great Britain was able to make a much more favourable peace in 1783 than had appeared likely at the time when North had been ousted. In spite of this, North was critical of the terms agreed by the Shelburne government which he felt undervalued the strength of the British negotiating position.

== Post-premiership ==
=== Fox–North coalition ===
In April 1783 North returned to power as Home Secretary in an unlikely coalition with the radical Whig leader Charles James Fox known as the Fox–North Coalition under the nominal leadership of the Duke of Portland. George III, who detested Fox, never forgave this supposed betrayal, and North never again served in government after the ministry fell in December 1783. One of the major achievements of the coalition was the signing of the Treaty of Paris, which formally ended the American War of Independence.

The new prime minister, William Pitt the Younger, was not expected to last long, and North, a vocal critic, still entertained hopes of regaining high office. In this he was to be frustrated, as Pitt dominated the British political scene for the next twenty years, leaving both North and Fox in the political wilderness.

=== Later years and death ===
North was an active speaker until he began to go blind in 1786. He succeeded his father as the 2nd Earl of Guilford on 4 August 1790 and entered the House of Lords, by which time he had entirely lost his sight. North died in Mayfair, England (now part of London), and was buried at All Saints' Church, Wroxton (Oxfordshire), near his family home of Wroxton Abbey. His memorial was sculpted by John Flaxman RA.

His son George North, Lord North, took over the constituency of Banbury, and in 1792 acceded to his father's title. Wroxton Abbey was until recently owned by Fairleigh Dickinson University, ironically an American college, with the modernised abbey serving as a location for American students to study abroad in England.

== Legacy ==
North is today predominantly remembered as the prime minister "who lost America".

Both Lord North Street and Guilford Street in London are named after him.

== Family ==
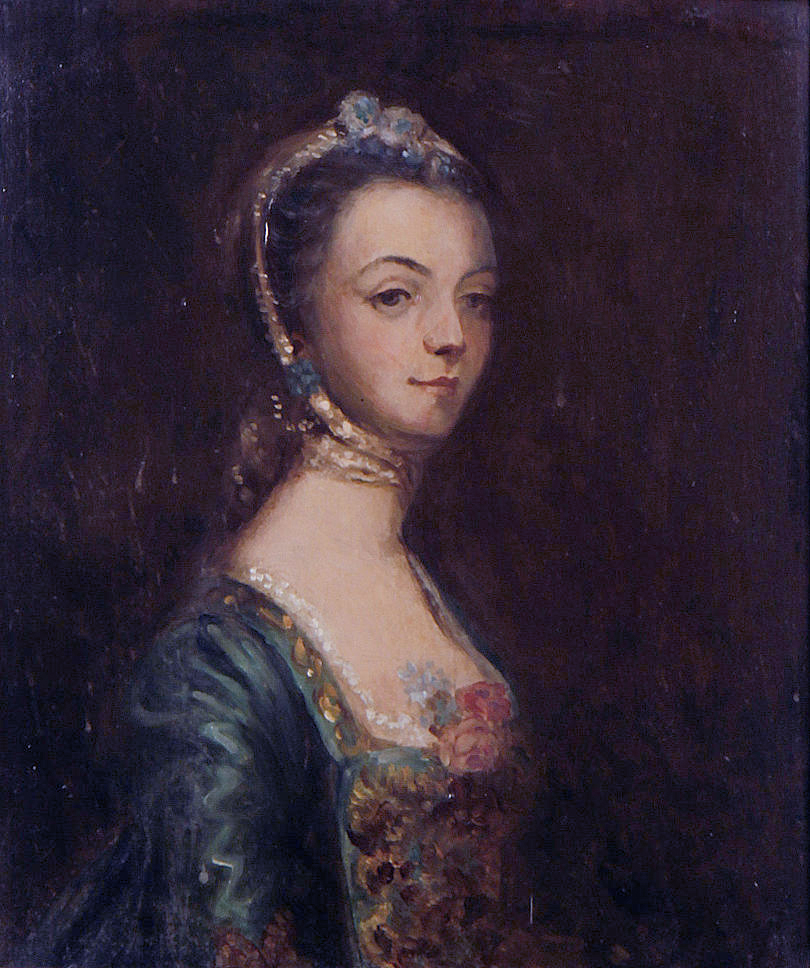
Anne Speke (before 1741 – 1797), wife of Lord North. Portrait by Sir Joshua Reynolds (1723–1792)

On 20 May 1756 North married Anne Speke (before 1741 – 1797), daughter of George Speke MP, of Whitelackington in Somerset. She was the sole heiress of the Devonshire estates of the Drake family of Ash, which subsequently were sold piecemeal by North. He and Anne had seven children:

- George Augustus North, 3rd Earl of Guilford (11 September 1757 – 20 April 1802), who married, firstly, Maria Frances Mary Hobart-Hampden (died 23 April 1794), daughter of the 3rd Earl of Buckinghamshire, on 30 September 1785 and had issue. He married, secondly, Susan Coutts (died 24 September 1837), on 28 February 1796.
- Catherine Anne North (1760–1817), who married Sylvester Douglas, 1st Baron Glenbervie, and had a son.
- Francis North, 4th Earl of Guilford (25 December 1761 – 1817)
- Lady Anne North (8 January 1764 – 18 January 1832), who married the 1st Earl of Sheffield on 20 January 1798 and had two children
- Frederick North, 5th Earl of Guilford (7 February 1766 – 1827)
- Lady Charlotte North (December 1770–25 October 1849), who married Lt. Col. The Hon. John Lindsay (15 March 1762 – 6 March 1826), son of the 5th Earl of Balcarres, on 2 April 1800.
- Dudley North (31 May 1777 – 1779). His name is missing from some lists of Lord and Lady North's children, which incorrectly state they only had six.

== Titles, styles and arms ==
- The Honourable Frederick North (1732–1752)
- Lord North (1752–1790)
- The Earl of Guilford (1790–1792)

Coat of arms of Frederick North, 2nd Earl of Guilford
| Crest A dragon's head erased sable ducally gorged and chained or. Escutcheon Azure, a lion passant or between three fleurs-de-lys argent. Supporters Two dragons sable ducally gorged and chained or. Motto La virtue est la seule noblesse (Virtue is the only nobility) and Animo et fide (With courage and fidelity). Orders The Most Noble Order of the Garter (Knight Companion) |

== Notes ==
Political offices
| Preceded by Charles Townshend | Paymaster of the Forces; 1766–1767; Served alongside: George Cooke | Succeeded by George Cooke; Thomas Townshend |
| Preceded by Charles Townshend | Chancellor of the Exchequer; 1767–1782 | Succeeded by Lord John Cavendish |
| Preceded by Henry Seymour Conway | Leader of the House of Commons; 1768–1782 | Succeeded by Charles James Fox |
| Preceded by The Duke of Grafton | Prime Minister of Great Britain; 1770–1782 | Succeeded by The Marquess of Rockingham |
| Preceded by The Duke of Grafton | First Lord of the Treasury; 1770–1782 | Succeeded by The Marquess of Rockingham |
| Preceded by Thomas Townshend | Home Secretary; 1783 | Succeeded by The Earl Temple |
| Preceded by Thomas Townshend | Leader of the House of Commons; 1783; Served alongside: Charles James Fox | Succeeded by William Pitt the Younger |
Parliament of Great Britain
| Preceded by John Willes | Member of Parliament for Banbury; 1754–1790 | Succeeded by Lord North |
Honorary titles
| Preceded by The Duke of Bedford | President of the Foundling Hospital; 1771–1792 | Succeeded by The Duke of Portland |
| Preceded by The Earl of Thomond | Lord Lieutenant of Somerset; 1774–1792 | Succeeded by The Earl Poulett |
| Preceded by The Earl of Holdernesse | Lord Warden of the Cinque Ports; 1778–1792 | Succeeded by William Pitt the Younger |
Academic offices
| Preceded by The Earl of Lichfield | Chancellor of the University of Oxford; 1772–1792 | Succeeded by The Duke of Portland |
Peerage of Great Britain
| Preceded by Francis North | Earl of Guilford; 1790–1792 | Succeeded by George North |
