= Francis North, 1st Earl of Guilford =

British politician and courtier

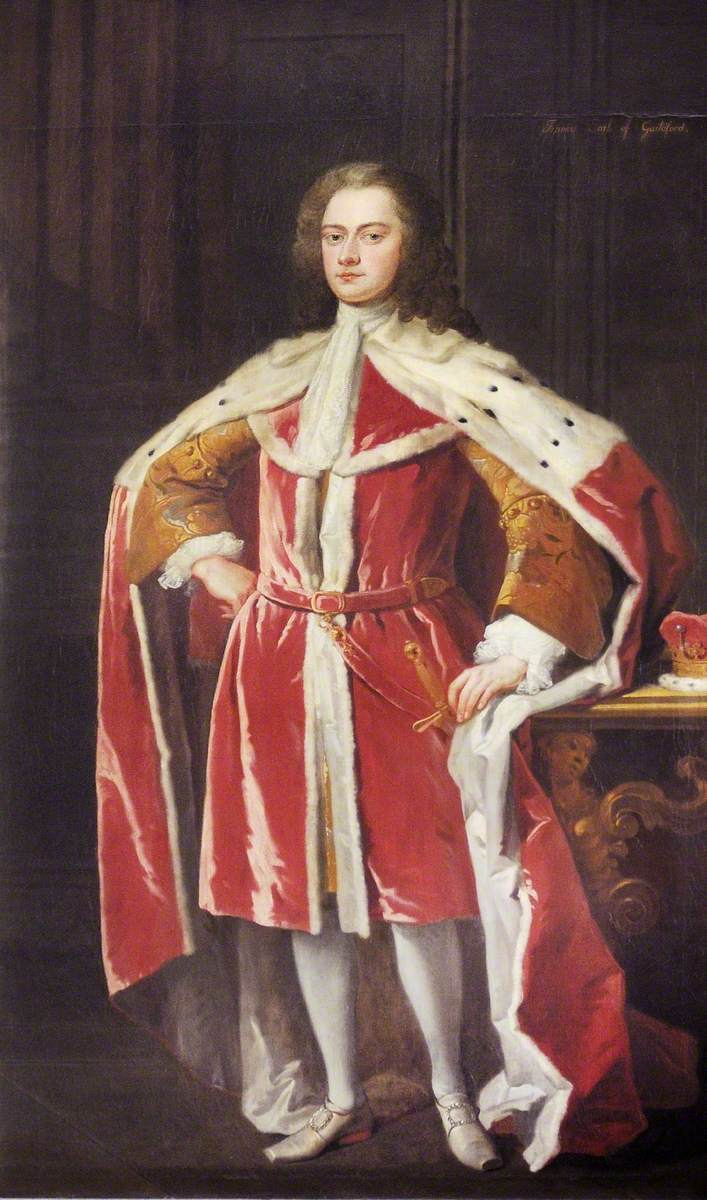
Portrait of Guilford by John Vanderbank

Francis North, 1st Earl of Guilford (13 April 1704 – 4 August 1790), styled as Lord Guilford between 1729 and 1752, was a British Whig politician and courtier who sat in the House of Commons of Great Britain from 1727 to 1729 when he succeeded to the peerage as Baron Guildford. He also became the Treasurer of Queen Charlotte of the Royal House of Mecklenburg. His son, Frederick North, was the famous Prime Minister of Great Britain who lost the American Revolutionary War under his term.

== Early life ==
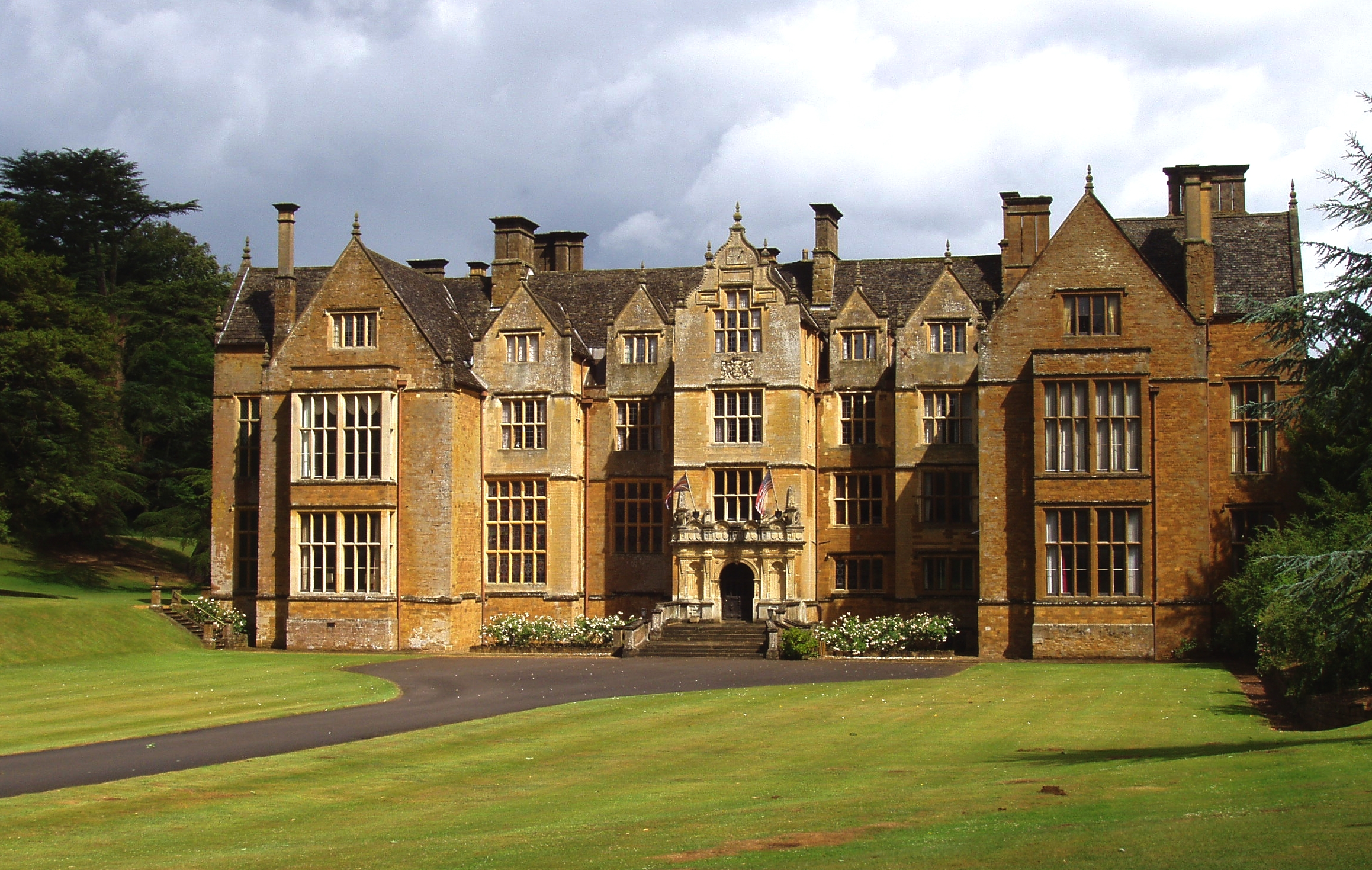
Wroxton Abbey

North was the son of Francis North, 2nd Baron Guilford, and his wife Alice Brownlow, daughter of Sir John Brownlow, 3rd Baronet, of Humby, Lincolnshire. He was educated at Eton College and matriculated at Trinity College, Oxford on 25 March 1721, aged 16. He undertook a Grand Tour in about 1722.

== Career ==
At the 1727 British general election, North was returned unopposed as Whig Member of Parliament for Banbury on the family interest. When he succeeded his father as third Baron Guilford on 17 October 1729, he vacated his seat in the House of Commons and entered the House of Lords. He became Gentleman of the Bedchamber to Frederick, Prince of Wales in October 1730. In 1734, he succeeded his cousin, William North, 6th Baron North as seventh Baron North. He was appointed governor to Prince George, later George III, in September 1750 which lasted until April 1751 and also gave up his other court position in 1751. On 8 April 1752, he was created Earl of Guilford in the Peerage of Great Britain. He was appointed High Steward of Banbury for life in 1766. In December 1773 he was appointed treasurer to Queen Consort for life.

== Family ==
North married Lady Lucy Montagu of the House of Montagu, daughter of George Montagu, 1st Earl of Halifax, in 1728. She died in 1734, and he married as his second wife Elizabeth Kaye, daughter of Sir Arthur Kaye Bt MP, in 1736. After her death in 1745, he married as his third wife Catherine Furnese, daughter of Sir Robert Furnese Bt MP, in 1751. She died in 1776.

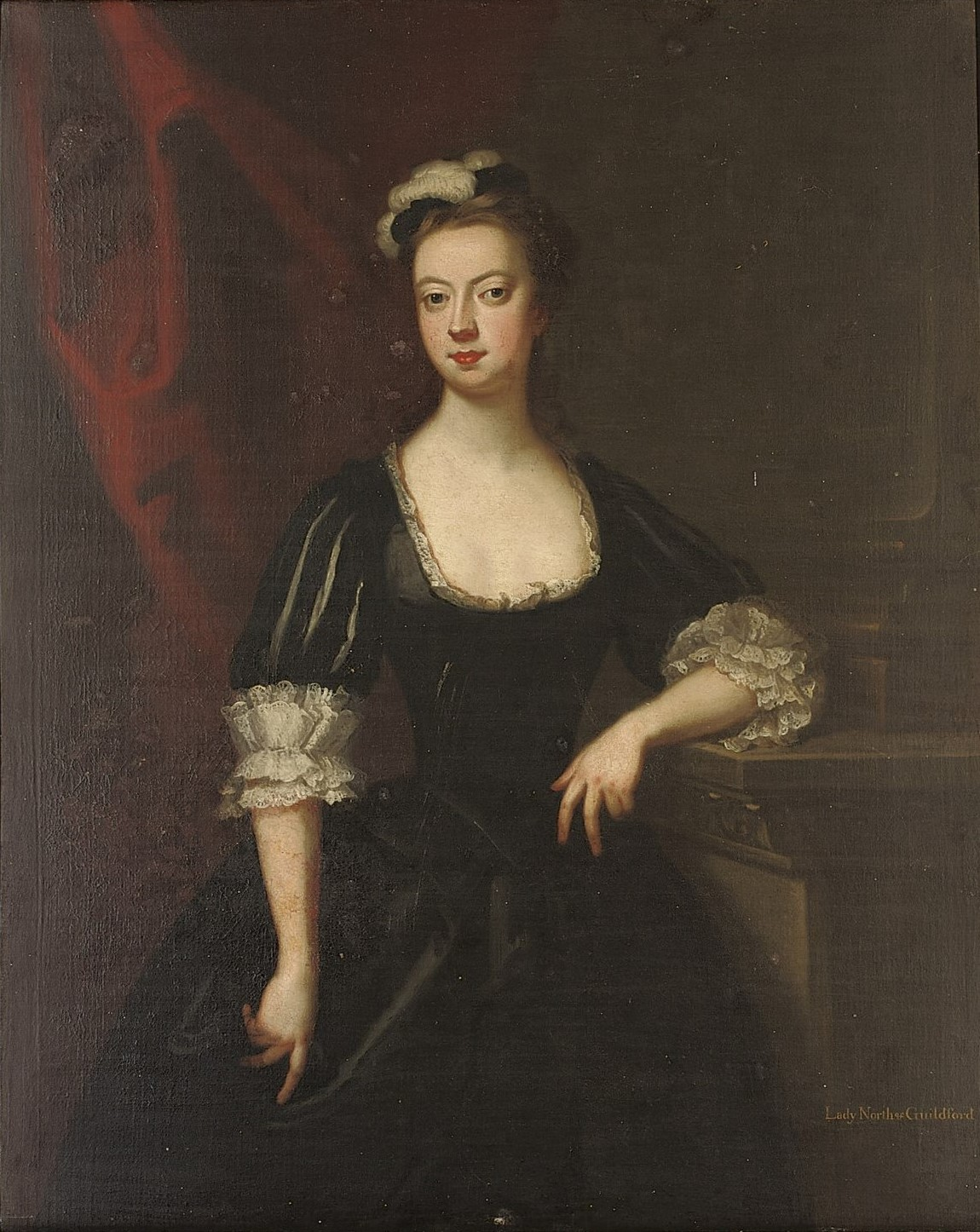
Portrait of Lucy Montagu

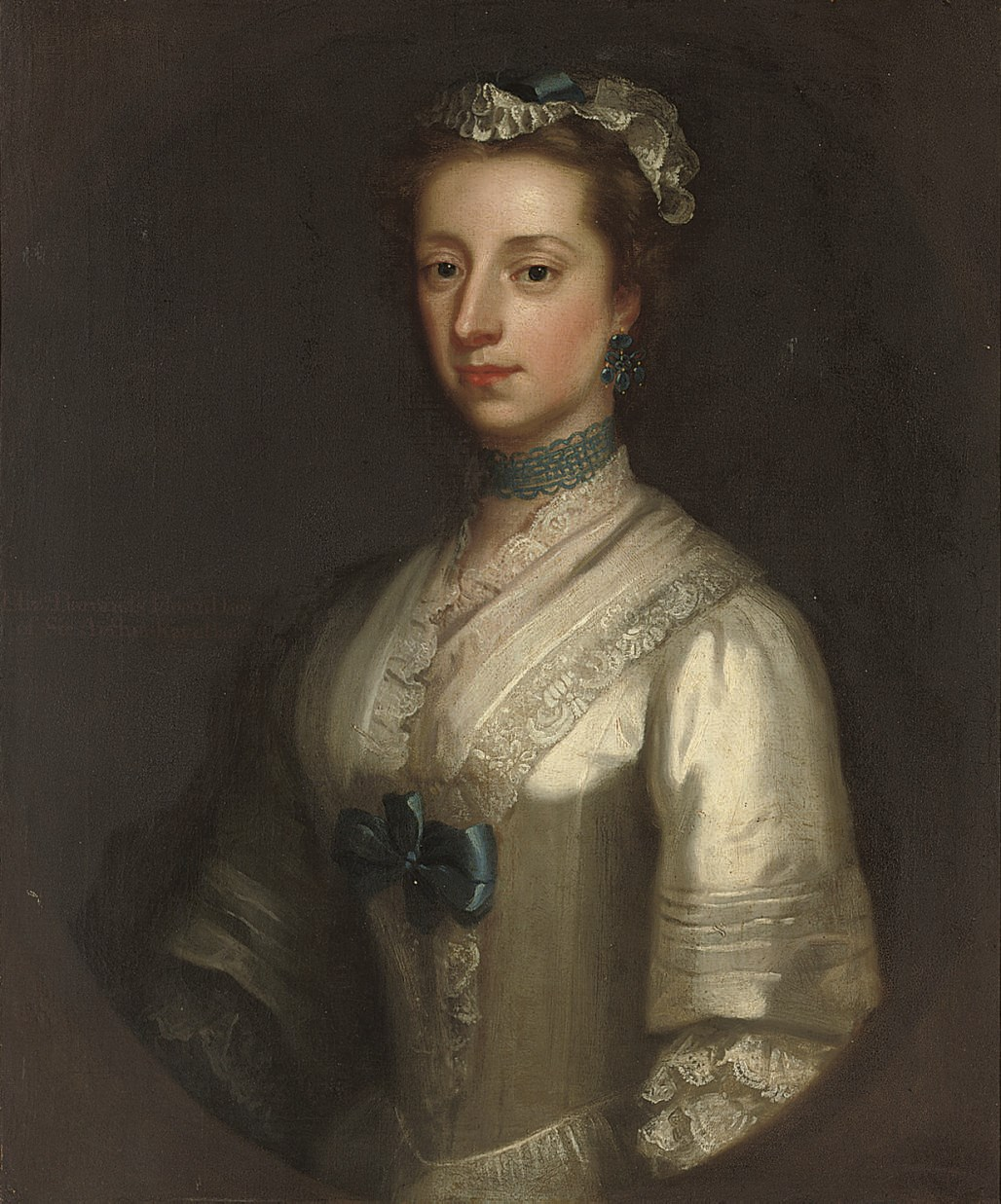
Portrait of Elizabeth Kaye

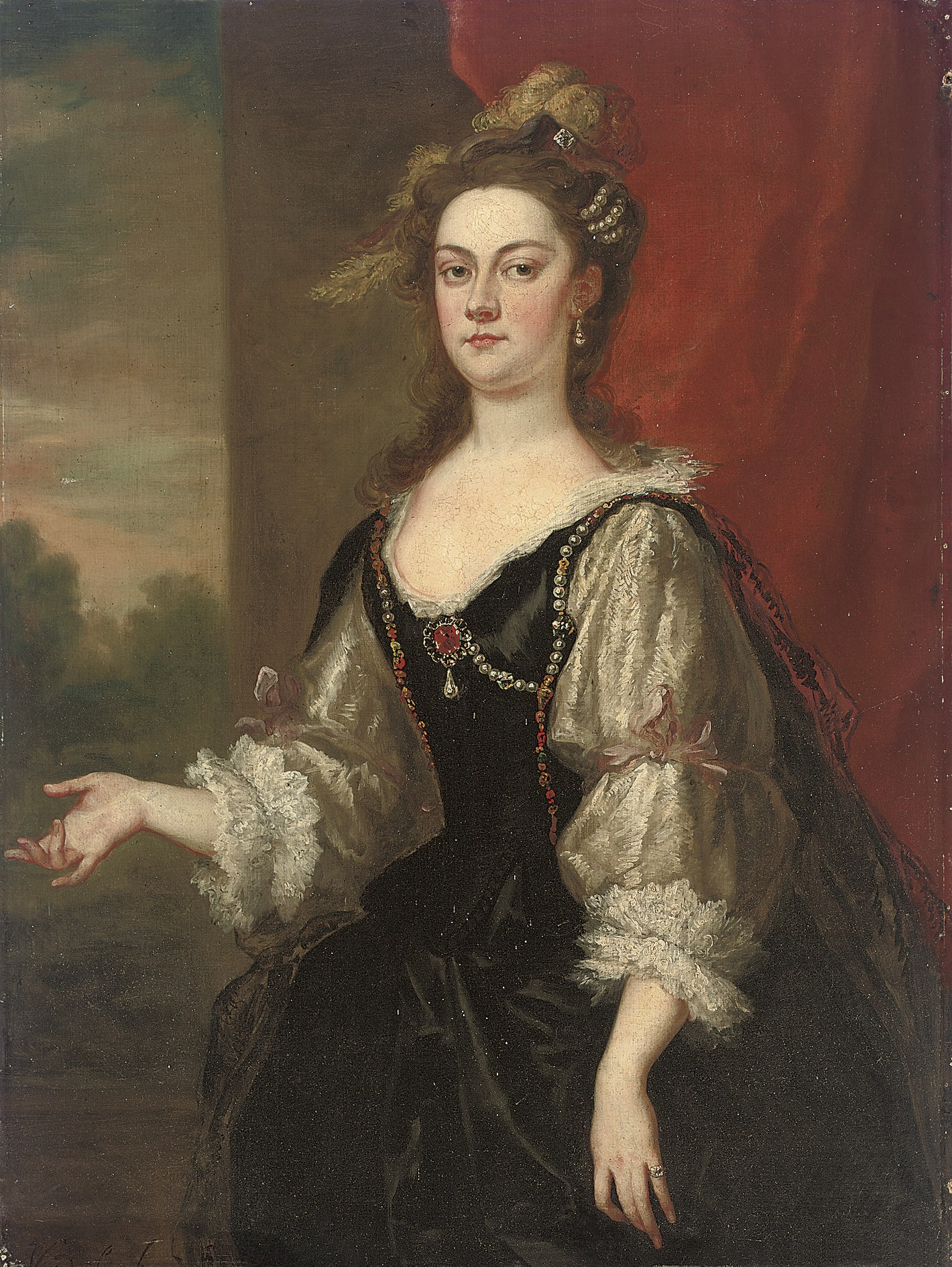
Portrait of Katherine Furnese

== Death and legacy ==
Lord Guilford survived his third wife by fourteen years and died in August 1790, aged 86. He was succeeded by his son from his first marriage, Frederick North, Lord North, who had previously served as Prime Minister of Great Britain from 1770 to 1782. His stepson Lord Dartmouth also served in government.

Lord Guilford is the namesake of Guilford County, North Carolina. and Guilford, Windham County, Vermont.

== Sources ==
- Kidd, Charles, Williamson, David (editors). Debrett's Peerage and Baronetage (1990 edition). New York: St Martin's Press, 1990.

Parliament of Great Britain
Preceded by Monoux Cope	Member of Parliament for Banbury; 1727–1729	Succeeded by Toby Chauncy
Court offices
Preceded by Andrew Stone	Treasurer to Queen Charlotte; 1774–1790	Vacant Title next held by The Earl of Ailesbury
Peerage of Great Britain
New creation	Earl of Guilford; 1752–1790	Succeeded by Frederick North
Peerage of England
Preceded by William North	Baron North; 1734–1790	Succeeded by Frederick North
Preceded by Francis North	Baron Guilford; 1729–1790	Succeeded by Frederick North
