= Earl of Guilford =

Earldom in the Peerage of Great Britain

Earldom of Guilford
- Creation date: 1670 (first creation); 1752 (second creation)
- Created by: Charles II of England
- Peerage: Peerage of England (first creation); Peerage of Great Britain (second creation)
- First holder: Francis North, 1st Earl of Guilford (first creation)
- Present holder: Piers Edward Brownlow North, 10th Earl of Guilford
- Heir apparent: Frederick Edward George North, Lord North
- Extinction date: 1682 (first creation)
- Seats: Waldershare House, Dover, Kent

Earl of Guilford is a title that has been created three times in history. The title was created for the first time in the Peerage of England in 1660 (as Countess of Guilford) for Elizabeth Boyle. She was a daughter of William Feilding, 1st Earl of Denbigh, and the widow of Lewis Boyle, 1st Viscount Boyle of Kinalmeaky. The title was for life only and became extinct on her death in 1667. The title was created for a second time in the Peerage of England in 1674 for John Maitland, 1st Duke of Lauderdale. For more information on this creation, see the article on him as well as the Earl of Lauderdale.

== History ==
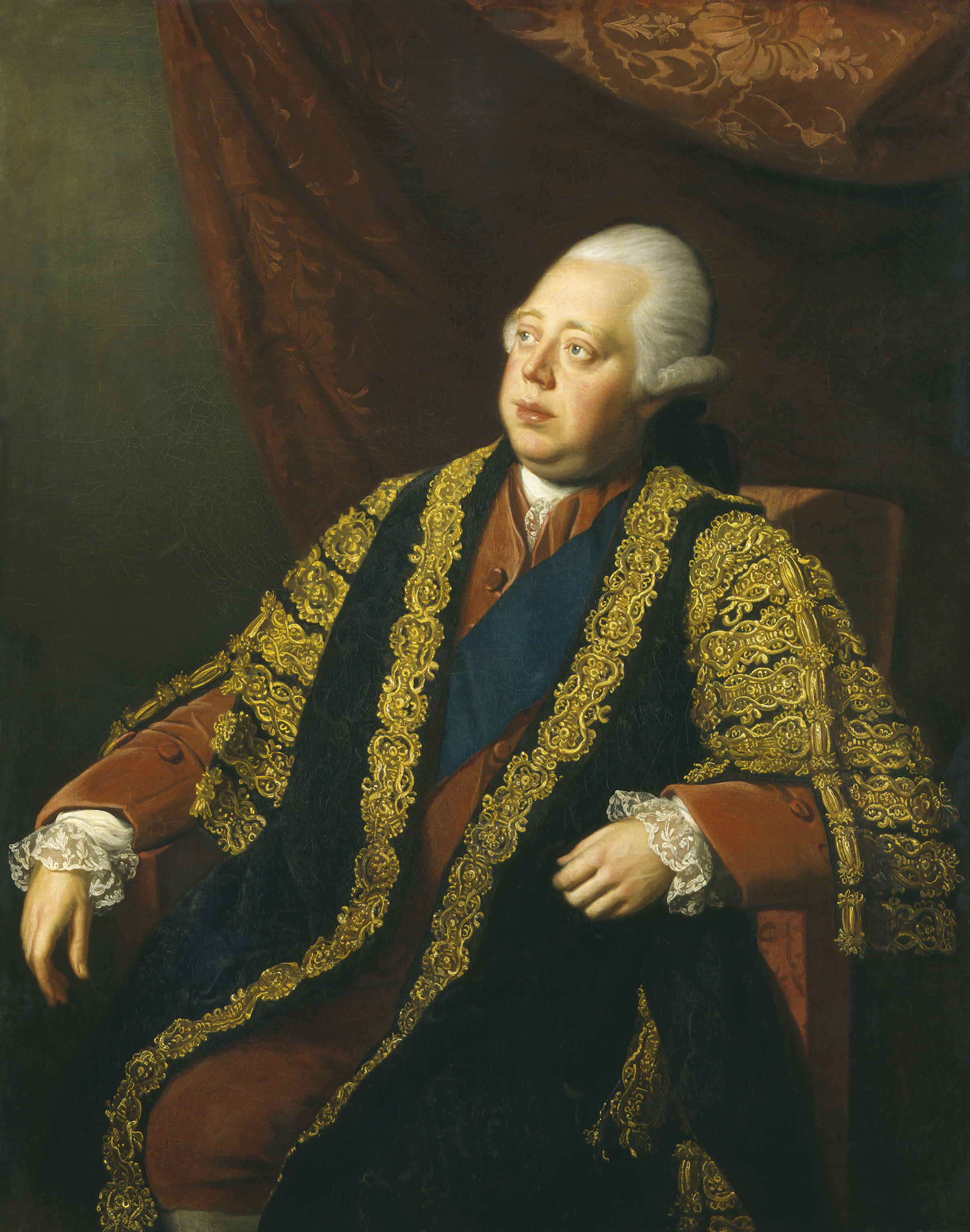
A portrait of Frederick North, 2nd Earl of Guilford

Despite the first two creations, the title of Earl of Guilford is chiefly associated with one branch of the North family, which descends from the Hon. Sir Francis North, second son of Dudley North, 4th Baron North (see the Baron North for earlier history of the family), a lawyer and politician. He was Chief Justice of the Common Pleas from 1675 to 1682 and Lord Keeper of the Great Seal from 1682 to 1685. In 1683 he was created Baron Guilford, of Guilford (now spelled Guildford) in the County of Surrey, in the Peerage of England. He died in middle age and was succeeded by his son, the second Baron, who briefly served as President of the Board of Trade from 1713 to 1714 and was also Lord-Lieutenant of Essex. His son, the third Baron, represented Banbury in the House of Commons of Great Britain. In 1734 he succeeded his cousin as seventh Baron North and in 1752 was honoured by being created Earl of Guilford in the Peerage of Great Britain.

The first Earl of the new creation was succeeded by his son, the second Earl. Known mainly under his courtesy title of Lord North, which he used from 1752 to 1790, he was one of the most influential statesmen of the second half of the 18th century. As Prime Minister of Great Britain between 1770 and 1782, he was a major figure in the American Revolution. North also held two of the other great offices of state, those of Chancellor of the Exchequer and Home Secretary. He was succeeded by his eldest son, the third Earl. He represented several constituencies in the House of Commons. Lord Guilford had no sons, and on his death the barony of North fell into abeyance between his daughters (see the Baron North page for further history of this title). He was succeeded in the barony and the earldom of Guilford by his younger brother, the fourth Earl. He died childless and was succeeded by his younger brother, the fifth Earl. He had been one of the Members of Parliament for Banbury from 1792 to 1794 and had also served as Governor of Ceylon from 1798 to 1805. He was also childless, and on his death the titles passed to his cousin, the sixth Earl, a clergyman. He was succeeded by his grandson, the seventh Earl. His son, the eighth Earl, was a Lieutenant-Colonel in the Royal East Kent Yeomanry and also Territorial Force Reserve, and a lieutenant in the 4th battalion Gloucester regiment. When he died the peerages were inherited by his grandson, the ninth Earl. As of 2009 the titles are held by the latter's only son, the tenth Earl, who succeeded in 1999.

Three other members of the North family may also be mentioned. Frederic Dudley North (1866–1921), great-grandson of the Reverend Charles Augustus North, younger brother of the sixth earl, was a prominent civil servant in Australia. His son Charles Frederic North (1887–1979) was Speaker of the Legislative Assembly of Western Australia from 1947 to 1953. Jonathan North (b. 1931), son of the Hon. John Montagu William North, second son of the eighth Earl, succeeded his maternal grandfather as second Baronet, of Southwell, in 1947 (see North Baronets).

Lacking a different secondary title, the heirs apparent to the earldom have continued to use Lord North as a courtesy title. An unqualified reference to Lord North almost always refers to Frederick North, later second Earl of Guilford.

The family seat is Waldershare Park, near Dover, Kent, although the mansion itself was sold to a developer in the 1970s. The town in Surrey from which both titles derive is now spelt Guildford.

== Countesses of Guilford (1660) ==
- Elizabeth Boyle, Countess of Guilford (d. 1667)

== Earls of Guilford (1674) ==
- see the Earl of Lauderdale

== Barons Guilford (1683) ==
- Francis North, 1st Baron Guilford (1637–1685)
- Francis North, 2nd Baron Guilford (1673–1729)
- Francis North, 3rd Baron Guilford (1704–1790) (created Earl of Guilford in 1752)

== Earls of Guilford (1752) ==
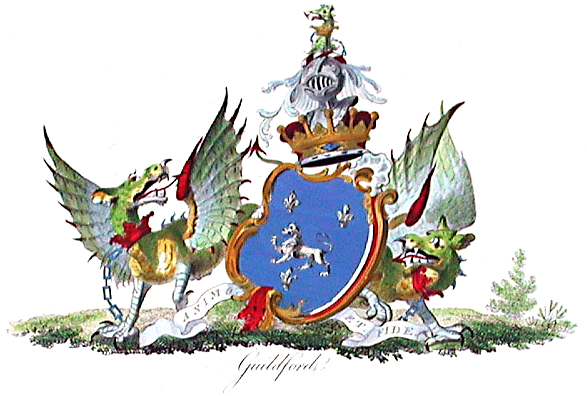
Arms of the Earls of Guilford

- Francis North, 1st Earl of Guilford (1704–1790)
- Frederick North, 2nd Earl of Guilford (1732–1792)
- George Augustus North, 3rd Earl of Guilford (1757–1802)
- Francis North, 4th Earl of Guilford (1761–1817)
- Frederick North, 5th Earl of Guilford (1766–1827)
- Francis North, 6th Earl of Guilford (1772–1861), clergyman, Master of Hospital of St. Cross, Winchester, the inspiration for The Warden by Anthony Trollope
  - Dudley North, Lord North (1829–1860)
- Dudley Francis North, 7th Earl of Guilford (1851–1885)
  - Dudley Francis North, Lord North (1875–1875)
- Frederick George North, 8th Earl of Guilford (1876–1949)
  - Francis George North, Lord North (1902–1940)
- Edward Francis North, 9th Earl of Guilford (1933–1999)
- Piers Edward Brownlow North, 10th Earl of Guilford (b. 1971)

== Present peer ==
Piers Edward Brownlow North, 10th Earl of Guilford (born 9 March 1971) is the son of the 9th Earl and his wife Osyth Vere Napier Leeston. On 26 March 1999 he succeeded as Earl of Guilford (1752) and Baron Guilford (1683). In 2003 he lived at Waldershare Park, near Dover.

On 26 March 1994, he married Michèle C. de Marigny, daughter of Gilbert Desvaux de Marigny, of Curepipe, Mauritius, and they had two children:

- Lady Tatiana Grace North (born 2000)
- Frederick Edward George North, Lord North (born 2002), heir apparent.

== Arms ==
Coat of arms of North, Earls of Guilford
Crest A dragon's head erased sable ducally gorged and chained or. Escutcheon Azure a lion passant or between three fleurs-de-lys argent. Supporters Two mastiffs proper Motto Animo et fide (With courage and fidelity). Other versions The earlier earls had as supporters two dragons sable, gorged and chained or. There was also an alternative motto - La vertue est la seule noblesse (Virtue is the only nobility)

== See also ==
- Baron North
- North Baronets, of Southwell

== Sources ==
- Hesilrige, Arthur G. M. (1921). Debrett's Peerage and Titles of courtesy. London UK: Dean & Son. p. 427.
- Kidd, Charles; Williamson, David, eds. (2003). Debrett's Peerage and Baronetage. London: Macmillan. pp. P701–P703. ISBN 978-0-3336-6093-5.
- Chisholm, Hugh (1911). "Guilford, Barons and Earls of" . In Chisholm, Hugh (ed.). Encyclopædia Britannica. Vol. 12 (11th ed.). Cambridge University Press. p. 691.
