= Windebank =

Windebank is an English surname. Notable people with the surname include:

- Sir Francis Windebank (1582–1646), English politician who was Secretary of State under Charles I of England
- Sir Thomas Windebank, 1st Baronet (born c. 1612), M.P. for Wootton Bassett and supported the Royalist cause in the English Civil War
- Francis Windebank (Royalist soldier) (died 1645), supported the Royalist cause during the English Civil War
- Christopher Windebank (born 1615), an Englishman who lived in Madrid and worked as a guide and interpreter for English ambassadors
- John Windebank (1618–1704), an English physician who was admitted as an honorary fellow of the Royal College of Physicians in 1680
- Windebank (Hampshire cricketer), English professional cricketer.

== See also ==
- Windebank baronets, of Haines Hill (1645), extinct 1719
