= Carlo Ubertino Solaro, Count of Moretta =

Italian diplomat

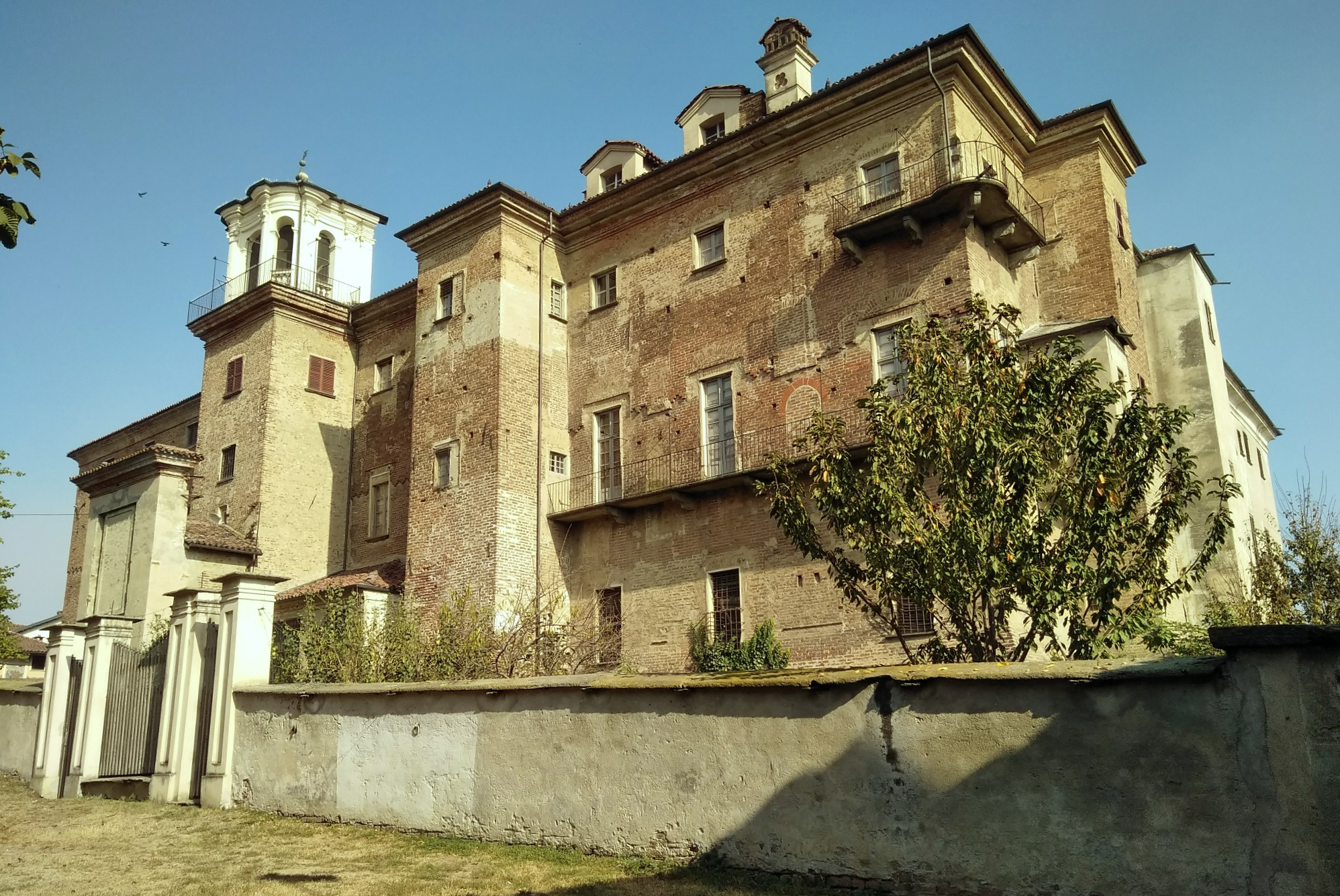
Castello della Moretta

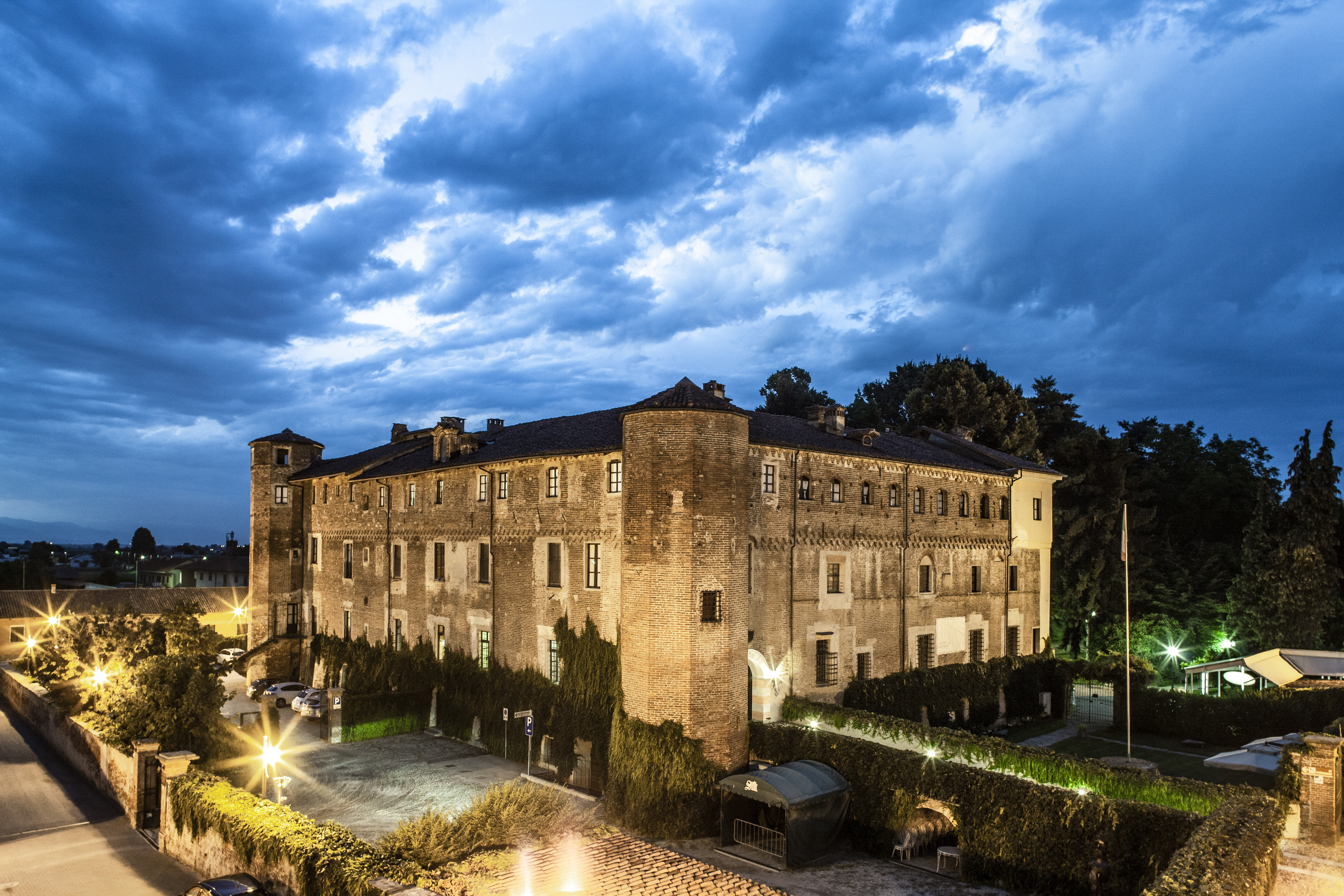
The Castello dei Solaro, at Villanova Solaro

Carlo Ubertino Solaro, Count of Moretta (born 1540) was a diplomat from Piedmont serving Emmanuel Philibert, Duke of Savoy. He is sometimes known as the Monsieur de Morette, Obertino Solaro, or Robertino.

== Diplomat ==
He was a son of Bartolommeo Solaro of Moretta and Casalgrasso, a landowner in the Province of Cuneo. Carlo Ubertino, Count of Moretta is known for his diplomatic missions to Rome, France, Portugal, England, and Scotland. He married Lucrezia Della Rovere, a sister of Gerolamo Della Rovere, Bishop of Toulon and Archbishop of Turin, in 1558. He received the French Order of Saint Michael.

== Missions to England and Scotland ==
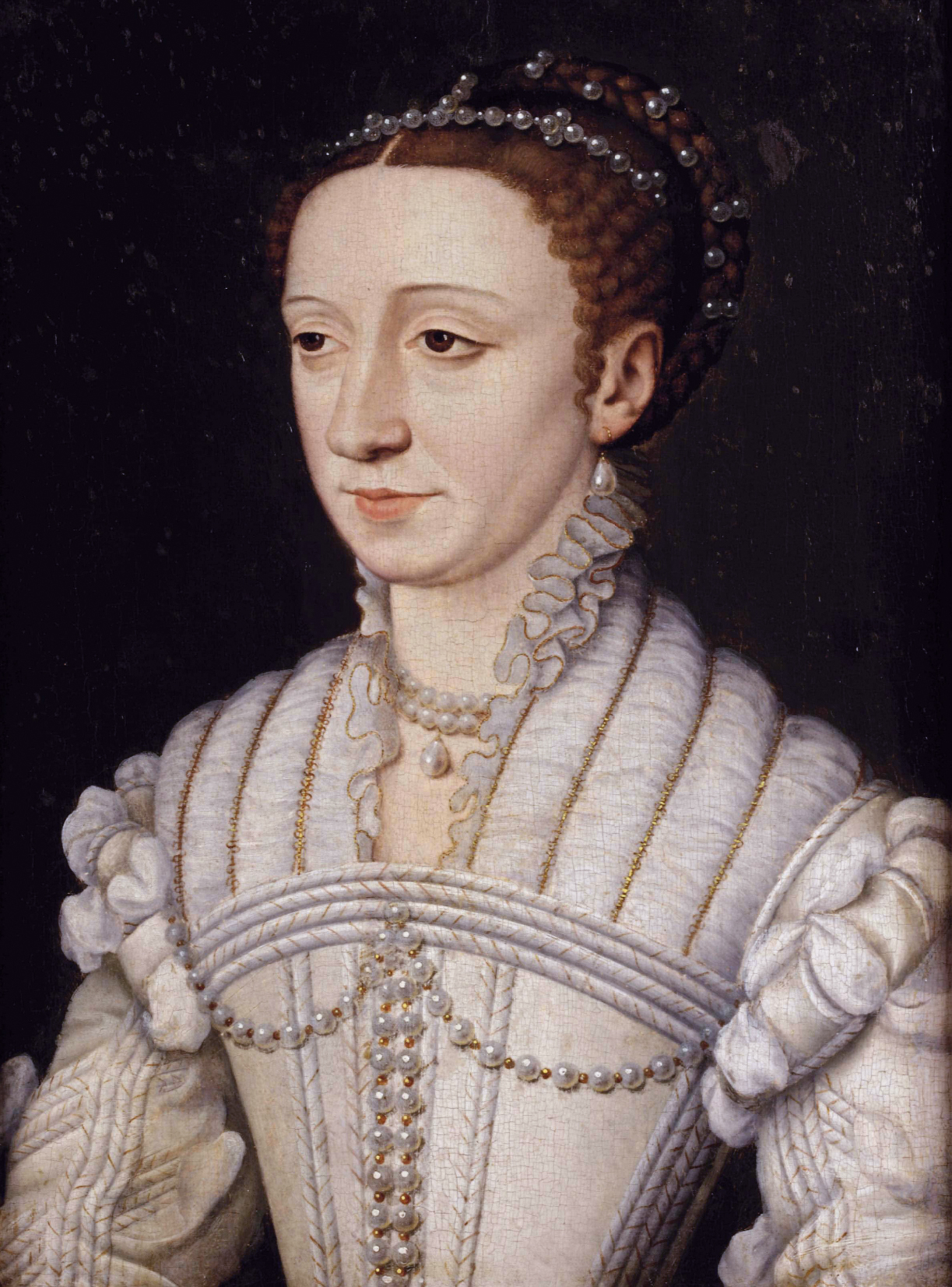
The Count of Moretta announced the pregnancy of Margaret of Valois in France, England, and Scotland

He was sent to England and Scotland as the ambassador of Savoy in 1560 and 1561 with schemes for the potential marriages of Jacques de Savoie, Duke of Nemours and Alfonso II d'Este, Duke of Ferrara to Elizabeth I and Mary, Queen of Scots. These marriage plans may have been proposed by Ippolito II d'Este, Cardinal of Ferrara, and uncle of Alfonso II d'Este. Ippolito II d'Este had spent time with Mary's father, James V, in France in 1536.

Moretta made his first visit to England in November 1560. He returned via France, joining the French court at the Palace of Fontainebleau. An English diplomat in Paris, Nicholas Throckmorton, who had previously had identified Moretta as a nephew and successor of Charles de Solier, comte de Morette, and thought him a good skilled courtier, heard that Elizabeth I had failed to give him the usual diplomatic gift on his first visit, and suggested she send a gold chain.

In 1561, Moretta was sent to announce the news of the pregnancy of the Duchess of Savoy, Margaret of Valois, a daughter of Francis I of France. His brother-in-law, Girolamo Della Rovere, accompanied him on this mission. He visited the French ambassador in London, Michel de Seure. De Seure heard that Elizabeth I said to Moretta that she was young and did not need to lean on a husband like an old lady with a walking stick. diplomats

The Spanish ambassador in London, Álvaro de la Quadra, was highly critical of Moretta's proposals regarding the marriages and the possibility of Elizabeth I sending delegates to a Papal council, a session of the Council of Trent. Moretta also met two junior English diplomats John Somers and Robert Jones.

Moretta came to Scotland in November 1561 to meet Mary, Queen of Scots. He stayed near Holyrood Palace, at the house of the queen's brother Lord Robert Stewart. He watched courtiers ride in costume at "running at the ring" on the sands of Leith, where he chatted to the English diplomat Thomas Randolph. The event, the second of two tournaments at Leith, was probably a celebration of Mary's birthday.

David Rizzio was a member of Moretta's retinue in Edinburgh, said to be a servant of Moretta's brother-in-law, the Bishop of Toulon. The French ambassador Paul de Foix wrote that Moretta had "given" Rizzio to Mary. Rizzio's home town in Piedmont was Pancalieri, close to Casalgrasso. Rizzio stayed in Scotland, Moretta returned to Piedmont via London and France, convinced that Mary had determined to marry Carlos, Prince of Asturias. The Duke's son, Charles Emmanuel, was born in January 1562. Elizabeth I sent a gift to Moretta, who was with the French court at the Château de Saint-Germain-en-Laye, and he wrote to her that the Duchess and her son were well.

Moretta made another journey to Scotland for the baptism of James VI in December 1566 at Stirling Castle. However, he was delayed and Savoy was represented at the ceremony by Philibert du Croc. Moretta arrived in Scotland in January 1567, and gave Mary a fan with jewelled feathers.

=== Moretta and Lord Darnley ===
Moretta was still in Edinburgh when Darnley was murdered in February 1567, and he reported the evidence gathered from women who heard his shouts. He said that Mary had persuaded him not to meet with Darnley, neither was he permitted to see Darnley's body. Moretta's version of events at the Kirk o' Field seemed not to vindicate Mary from suspicion of involvement in the murder.
