= Robert Jones (diplomat) =

English diplomat (died 1574)

Robert Jones (died 1574) was an English diplomat, from April 1558 a Clerk of the Privy Seal, and keeper of the council chamber.

== Diplomat ==
Jones worked with John Somers and Henry Middlemore for Nicholas Throckmorton, the ambassador in France in 1559. Jones wrote friendly joking letters to Richard Oseley or Ouseley at the English court, mentioning his colleague Somers as a fellow player of the cithern, and listing their mutual friends including Gregory Railton and William Honnyng. Jones mentions in his letters reading the romance Amadis and works by Clément Marot. Sir Henry Paget wrote that Jones ought to defer his book buying until he came to Orléans, where the bookseller's daughter was the "fairest maid without comparison in Orléans or Paris".

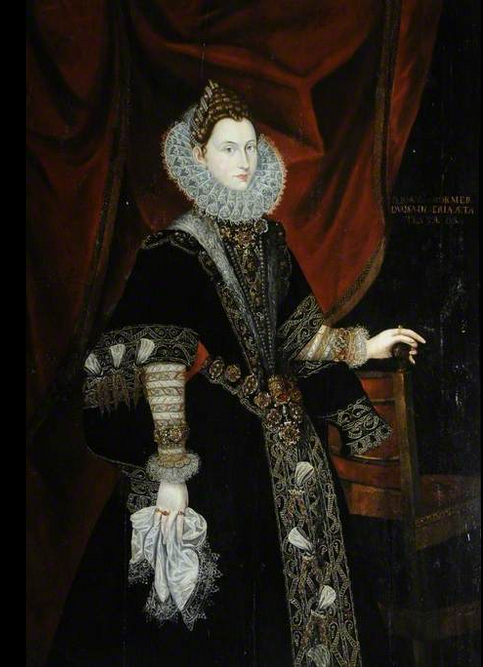
Jones and his colleagues talked to the Countess of Feria and her fellow travellers at Amboise

While Francis II of France was hunting at houses and estates belonging to the Duke of Guise in September 1559, Throckmorton, Somers, and Henry Killigrew toured Lorraine, visiting Metz and Nancy. Jones was left at Bar-le-Duc. Despite the tone of his correspondence, the historian Nicola Sutherland notes that Throckmorton's assistants in France, as Protestants and lacking ambassadorial status, were "disliked, distrusted, and isolated". Their situation deteriorated as English intervention in Scotland became more likely, and their role in subversion in France can be doubted.

Throckmorton sent Somers and Jones to talk to Jane Dormer and the Count of Feria as they were travelling to the Château d'Amboise in France in April 1560. They met Mary, Queen of Scots, and Francis II of France. Susan Clarencieux spoke to Throckmorton at Amboise, saying they were loyal subjects of Elizabeth I but were travelling to Spain for their religious conscience.

Like Somers and Railton, Jones was a cryptographer, with a reputation for breaking codes used in diplomatic correspondence between France and Scotland. Jones came to England as Throckmorton's messenger to Elizabeth I at Greenwich in November 1560. At this time there were discussions that Elizabeth I might marry James Hamilton, 3rd Earl of Arran and it was also rumoured she might marry a favourite, Robert Dudley. Dudley confronted Jones, asking if Mary, Queen of Scots and Queen of France, had relayed a rumour that Elizabeth would marry him, her horse-keeper. Jones thought that Dudley could only have heard this from Elizabeth herself.

After Jones had an audience with Elizabeth in November 1560, William Cecil complained to Throckmorton that his report contained "matter of such weight" that it was "unmeet" or unsuitable for a "woman's knowledge". Cecil objected to detail concerning the Council of Trent, apparently feeling that foreign policy ought not to be founded on unmediated intelligence.

In London, Somers and Jones met Carlo Ubertino Solaro, Count of Moretta, the ambassador from Savoy in November 1561.

== Family ==
Jones had a brother, John Jones, who was a merchant tailor in Fleet Street, and a cousin, also John Jones, a tailor in the parish of St Ethelburga's Bishopsgate. He married Margaret Waad or Wade, a daughter of Armagil Waad, who served as Clerk of the Privy Council for Edward VI. When they were betrothed in January 1561, Jones wrote to Throckmorton that she was a skilled player on the virginals, and commented "blessed is the wooing that is not long a doing".

In 1570, Robert Jones was an overseer of Armagil Wade's will and received a bequest of 20 nobles "for his pains".
