= John Denham (poet) =

Anglo-Irish poet and courtier

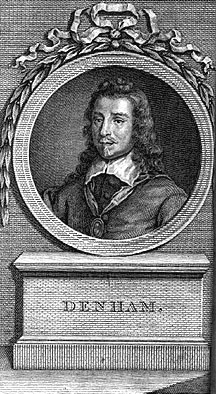
Sir John Denham

Sir John Denham FRS (1614 or 1615 – 19 March 1669) was an Anglo-Irish poet and courtier. He served as Surveyor of the King's Works and is buried in Westminster Abbey.

== Early life ==
Denham was born in Dublin to Sir John Denham, Chief Baron of the Irish Exchequer, and his second wife, Eleanor Moore, daughter of Garret Moore, 1st Viscount Moore, and his wife, Mary Colley. His father was a native of London; the family later settled at Egham in Surrey. His mother died in childbirth when he was about five years old. He was educated at Trinity College, Oxford, and at Lincoln's Inn in London. He was an indifferent student, and was notorious for heavy gambling, which was a source of much worry to his father. There is no evidence that he took his degree at Trinity.

== Marriages ==
He married firstly, in 1634, Ann Cotton, of a wealthy Gloucestershire family, by whom he had three children, a son who died young and two daughters who reached adulthood. He married secondly in 1665 Margaret Brooke (1642–1667), daughter of Sir William Brooke and his second wife Penelope Hill, and half-sister of the leading statesman Edward Russell, 1st Earl of Orford. His unhappy second marriage was the cause of much gossip, and Margaret's sudden death in 1667 gave rise to a widespread suspicion, probably unfounded, that he had poisoned her.

His first wife came from a wealthy family, but he seems to have run through her money quickly. His losses from gambling ran to several thousand pounds, although in the 1630s he made some effort to reform. On his father's death in 1639 he inherited the family estate at Egham. He proceeded to go on one more gambling spree, and again lost several thousand.

== Civil War ==
In his earlier years, Denham suffered for his Royalism; during the English Civil War, he was appointed High Sheriff of Surrey (for 1642) and governor of Farnham Castle. Farnham quickly fell to the Parliamentary forces and Denham was sent a prisoner to London, but was soon released. He spent the next five years in Oxford, where he enjoyed the trust and confidence of Charles I During the abortive peace negotiations of 1646, Parliament listed him as one of those who must be excluded from the King's counsels. In 1648 he joined the Court in exile, and spent the next four years abroad. He returned to England in 1652 to find that his lands had been sold; for a time he was almost penniless, until he acquired the protection of Philip Herbert, 5th Earl of Pembroke. The authorities, worried by his frequent visits to London, ordered him to choose a residence more than twenty miles from the capital, which he was not to leave. He settled at Bury St. Edmunds.

John Aubrey recorded a story of this period which reflects well on Denham's wit and generosity of spirit:

In the time of the civill warres, George Withers, the poet, begged Sir John Denham's estate at Egham of the Parliament, in whose cause he was a captaine of horse. It happened that G. W. was taken prisoner, and was in danger of his life, having written severely against the king, &c. [sic] Sir John Denham went to the king, and desired his majestie not to hang him, for that whilest G. W. lived he should not be the worst poet in England.

== After 1660 ==
Denham became a Member of Parliament for Old Sarum in 1661, became a Fellow of the Royal Society on 20 May 1663, and became a Knight of the Bath. He received substantial grants of land in compensation for his forfeited estates. He built or commissioned the original Burlington House in Piccadilly in about 1665.

After the Restoration Denham became Surveyor of the King's Works, probably due to his earlier political services rather than for any aptitude as an architect. John Webb, who, as Inigo Jones's deputy undoubtedly had the competence to have served in the post, complained that "though Mr. Denham may, as most gentry, have some knowledge of the theory of architecture, he can have none of the practice and must employ another". There is no evidence that he personally designed any buildings, although he seems to have been a competent administrator; he may, however, have played some part in the design of his own home, Burlington House. John Webb was appointed Denham's deputy by 1664 and did Denham's work at Greenwich (from 1666) and elsewhere.

=== Second marriage to Margaret Brooke ===
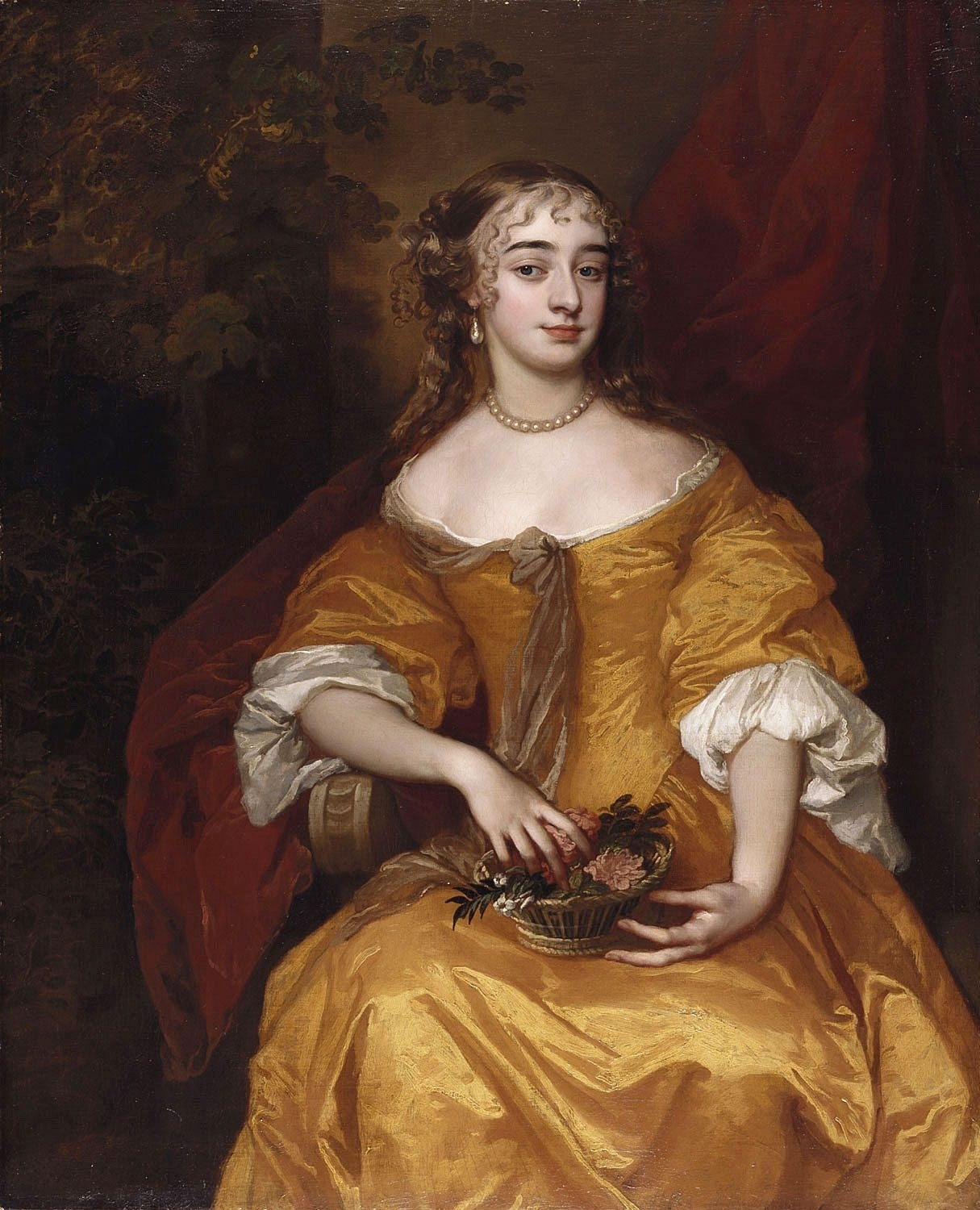
Denham's second wife Margaret Brooke, painted by Peter Lely

Denham in 1665 made an unhappy second marriage to Margaret Brooke, a beautiful young woman almost thirty years his junior, who conducted a very public affair with the future King James II. To her husband's mortification, she insisted on being acknowledged publicly as a Royal mistress, saying that she would not, unlike her predecessor Goditha Price (daughter of Sir Herbert Price, the Master of the Household), "go up and down the back stairs, but would be owned publicly". When she died in January 1667 after a short illness, Denham was rumoured, by Samuel Pepys among others, to have murdered her by giving her a poisoned cup of chocolate, although the autopsy found no trace of poison, and she had been seriously ill the previous year. In any case, rumour named several other possible poisoners, including James, his wife Anne Hyde and his sister-in-law, Lady Rochester.

=== Last years, death, and children ===
His last years were clouded by dementia. He had long been rumoured to be insane, a condition generally attributed to his scandalous marriage, and later the hostility of the London public, which regarded him as a murderer, and he became a virtual recluse. With Denham's increasing mental incapacity, Charles II requested in March 1669 that Christopher Wren be appointed Denham's "sole deputy"; Wren succeeded him as King's Surveyor upon his death two weeks later. Denham was buried in Poets' Corner of Westminster Abbey. The public suspicion about his role in his wife's death continued to the end of his life. He was survived by his daughters, Elizabeth, who married Sir Thomas Arden Price in 1675 but died childless, and Anne, who married Sir William Morley of Halnaker, by whom she had two sons who died young and a daughter Mary, who married James Stanley, 10th Earl of Derby, but had no surviving issue.

== Works ==
Denham began his literary career with a tragedy, The Sophy (1641), but his poem Cooper's Hill (1642) is the work by which he is remembered. It is the first example in English of a poem devoted to local description, picturing the Thames Valley scenery around his home at Egham in Surrey. The poem was praised by Samuel Johnson for its smooth flow and economy of language.Denham wrote many versions of this poem, reflecting the political and cultural upheavals of the Civil War.

Gilfillan wrote of Denham and his contemporary Edmund Waller: "Neither Denham nor Waller were great poets; but they have produced lines and verses so good, and have, besides, exerted an influence so considerable on modern versification, and the style of poetical utterance, that they are entitled to a highly respectable place amidst the sons of British song."

Court offices
Preceded by John Embree	Surveyor of the King's Works; 1660–1669	Succeeded by Christopher Wren
Parliament of England
Preceded by Seymour Bowman; John Norden	Member of Parliament for Old Sarum; 1661–1669; With: Edward Nicholas	Succeeded by Edward Nicholas; Eliab Harvey
