= Eliab Harvey (disambiguation) =

Eliab Harvey may refer to:

- Sir Eliab Harvey (1635–1699), English politician
- Eliab Harvey (1659–1681), MP for Old Sarum
- Eliab Harvey (1716–1769), MP for Dunwich
- Sir Eliab Harvey (1758–1830), Royal Navy admiral and politician
