= Gregory Railton =

Gregory Railton or Raylton (died 1561) was an English administrator and Clerk of the Signet. As a Protestant, Railton went into exile during the reign of Mary I of England.

== Career ==
Gregory Railton was for many years Ralph Sadler's servant and "inward man".

During the war known as the Rough Wooing, Railton was Treasurer of the Wars in the North (1549–1551). Railton was the accountant and courier of large sums of money for the English garrisons in Scotland. In August 1549, he wrote to the Earl of Rutland that he was unable to cross the flooded Tweed at Wark with his tired horses to bring money to the camp at Stichill.

In 1552, Railton requested a licence to eat meat on fast days as he was ill from a "sore ague" contracted at Chichester. He attended the funeral of Edward VI with the other clerks including William Honnyng.

Railton was a Marian exile in Frankfurt during Mary's reign. He wrote from Basel to William Petre, Mary's secretary, on 19 November 1554, apologising for his absence due to illness which left him unable to travel.

On his return to England, Railton was posted to Berwick-on-Tweed to work as Sadler's secretary. During the crisis of the Scottish Reformation, he deciphered coded letters, and was a correspondent of John Knox. He was involved in negotiations with the Duke of Châtellerault, one of the Protestant leaders in Scotland.

The English ambassador Nicholas Throckmorton in Paris and the diplomat Thomas Randolph organised the rescue and secret journey of Châtellerault's son, the Earl of Arran, from France to Scotland via Switzerland. James Croft sent Railton to meet the Earl, who was travelling under the alias Monsieur Beaufort, at Alnwick. Randolph, who used an alias Barnaby, wrote from Hamilton to Sadler at Berwick in cipher, with a pleasantry referring to their codework "desiring no less pleasure to Mr Railton in deciphering his own new invented orthography than I have in writing of it". William Cecil asked Sadler to tell Railton to keep the ciphered letters short and "write no more than needeth" to save labour reading them.

In the same month, October 1559, Knox wrote to Railton describing the inception of his The History of the Reformation in Scotland. He also wrote to describe a silver gilt seal and a "trim staff" sent to Scotland for Mary of Guise, Regent of Scotland. It was engraved with disputed heraldry that asserted the claim of Mary, Queen of Scots, to the throne of England. The heraldry was also displayed in various locations in France and observed by Throckmorton and his colleagues on their dinner plates during a royal banquet. Michel de Seure, the French ambassador in London, wrote to Mary of Guise about the friction caused by the controversial heraldry.

Gregory Railton died in 1561. Nicholas Throckmorton recommended John Somers for his position as Clerk of the Signet.
