= Sèvres (disambiguation) =

Sèvres is a commune in the suburbs of Paris

Sèvres or Sèvre may also refer to:

- Manufacture nationale de Sèvres, the Sèvres porcelain factory
- Treaty of Sèvres, a 1919 international treaty concerning the Middle East
- Protocol of Sèvres, a secret 1956 agreement between France, Israel and the United Kingdom concerning the Suez Crisis
- Michel de Sèvre (fl. 1539–1593), Knight Hospitaller, French courtier and diplomat, and Grand Master of the Order of Saint Lazarus

== See also ==
- Deux-Sèvres, a département in France
  - Sèvre Nantaise, a river in the département
  - Sèvre Niortaise, a river in the département
- Sèvres–Babylone station, a Paris Metro station
