= William Lambert =

William Lambert may refer to:

- William Lambert (MP) (fl. 1529), Member of the Parliament of England
- William Lambert (writer) (fl. 1791), engrosser of the United States Bill of Rights
- William Lambert (cricketer, born 1779) (1779–1851), English cricketer
- William Lambert (mayor) (1790–1853), mayor of Richmond, Virginia 1840–1853
- William Lambert (abolitionist) (1817–1890), African-American citizen and abolitionist
- William Frederick Lambert (1834–1908), member of the Queensland Legislative Council
- William Lambert (Middlesex cricketer) (1843–1927), English cricketer
- William Lambert (Australian politician) (1881–1928), Australian politician
- William Carpenter Lambert (1894–1982), American World War I ace
- William Lambert (journalist) (1920–1998), American journalist

== See also ==
- William Lambert Dobson (1833–1898), Australian politician
- Willie Lambert, New Democratic candidate, see Oakville
