= Robert Page (MP) =

English politician

Robert Page (fl. 1395–1397) was an English politician.

He was a Member (MP) of the Parliament of England for Old Sarum in 1395 and September 1397.

Parliament of England
Preceded by John Avery; John Chipplegh	Member of Parliament for Old Sarum; 1395; With: John Avery	Succeeded by ? ?
Parliament of England
Preceded by ? ?	Member of Parliament for Old Sarum; 1397; With: John Avery	Succeeded by ? ?
