= Windebank baronets =

Extinct baronetcy in the Baronetage of England

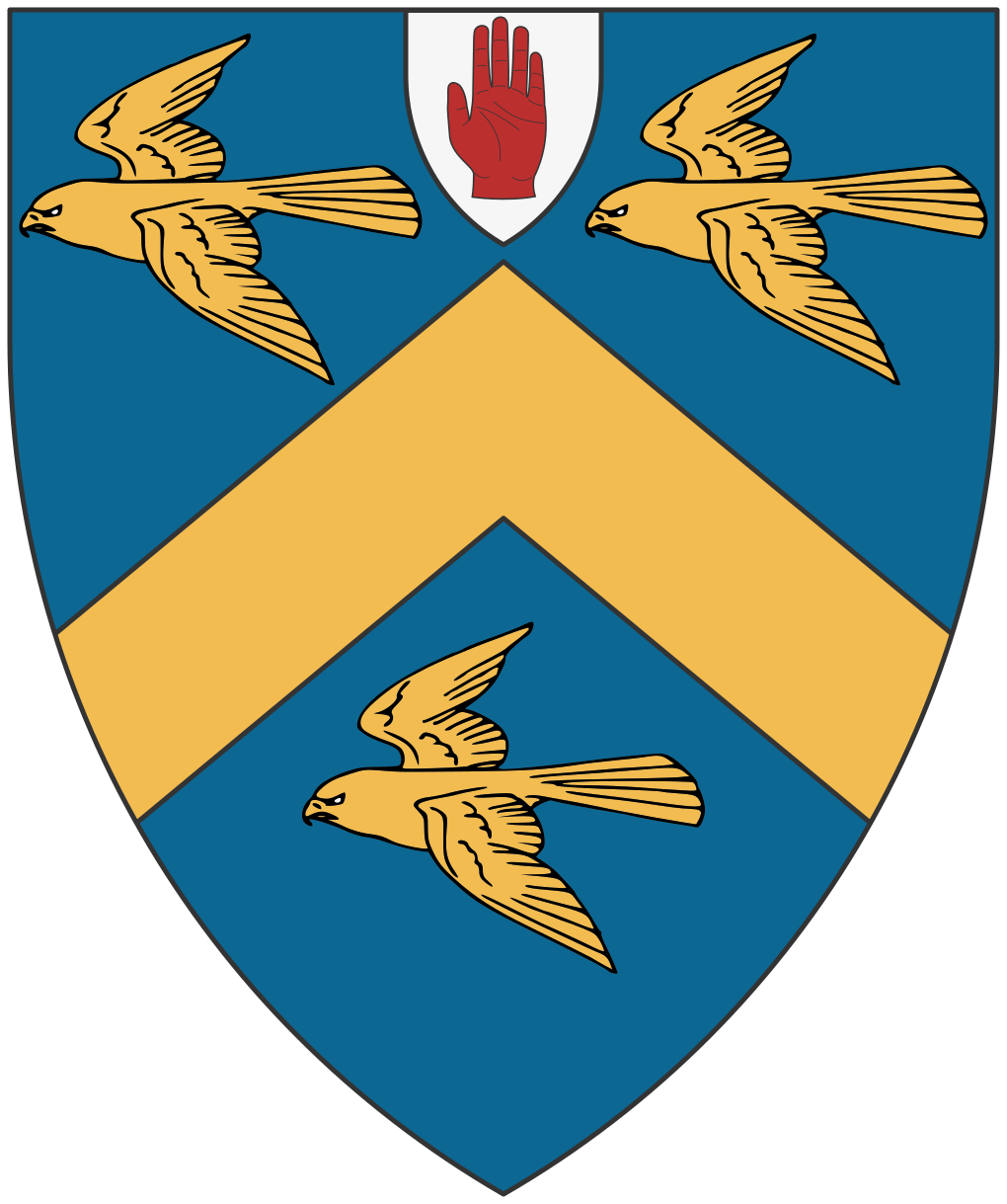
Arms of Windebank of Haines Hill

The Windebank Baronetcy (also spelled Windebanke) of Haines Hill in Berkshire, was a title in the Baronetage of England. It was created on 25 November 1645 for Thomas Windebank, Member of Parliament for Wootton Bassett and Clerk of the Signet. He was the eldest son of Sir Francis Windebank, Secretary of State under Charles I. The title became extinct on the death of the second Baronet in 1719.

== Windebank baronets ==
- Sir Thomas Windebank, 1st Baronet (born 1612)
- Sir Francis Windebank, 2nd Baronet (died 1719)
