= John Somers (courtier) =

English diplomat

John Somers or Somer or Sommers (died 1585) was an English diplomat, courtier, and cryptographer. He served as joint keeper of Mary, Queen of Scots, at Tutbury Castle with Ralph Sadler. Somers is said to have been Sadler's son-in-law.

== Diplomat ==
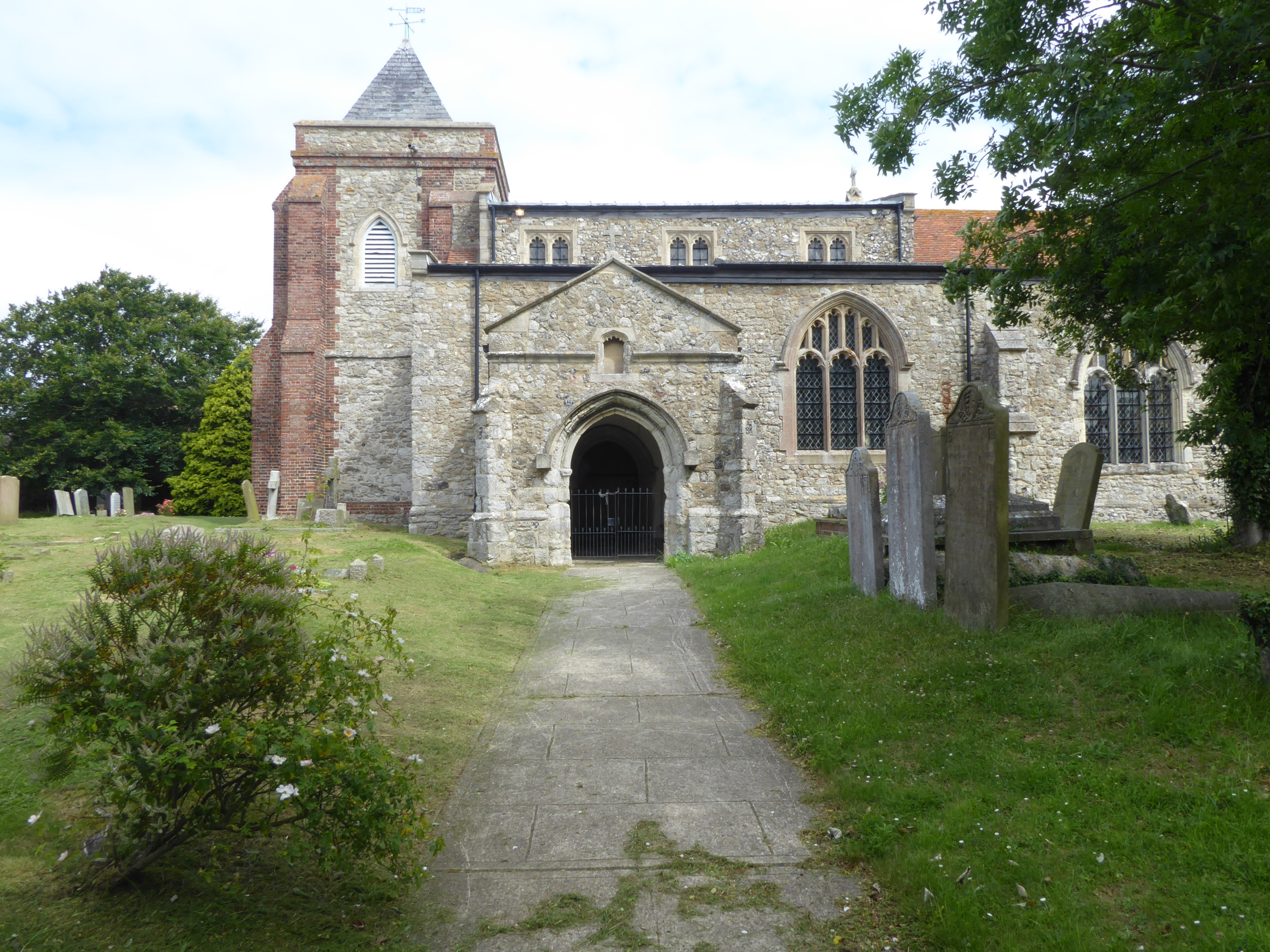
The Somers or Somer family lived at High Halstow, and in the 17th-century their estate was sold to the treasurers of the Chatham Chest.

As a diplomat, Somers worked as a secretary for Nicholas Wotton in Paris in 1554, and was available to tutor Wotton's guests in the French language. Wotton sent Somers to report to Mary I of England in March 1557 and ask for funds.

Somers worked for the English commissioners of the Treaty of Cateau-Cambrésis, and in March 1559 returned to bring Elizabeth I a summary of the ongoing negotiations. Somers worked with Robert Jones and Henry Middlemore for Nicholas Throckmorton, the ambassador in France in 1559.

Somers had discussions with the Duke of Guise and Cardinal of Lorraine, an uncle of Mary, Queen of Scots, who was Queen of France at this time. Somers looked after Thomas Cecil, eldest son of William Cecil and a student of Gray's Inn, on his first visit to France in June 1559 and taught him some French. Somers also bought books for William Cecil including, in February 1561, a gardening manual, possibly for his new works at Cecil House on the Strand.

While Francis II was hunting at houses and estates belonging to the Duke of Guise in September 1559, Throckmorton, Somers, and Henry Killigrew toured Lorraine, visiting Toul, Metz, Thionville, Nancy, Saint-Nicolas-de-Port, and Saint-Dizier.

In April 1560, Throckmorton sent John Somers and Robert Jones to meet Jane Dormer and the Count of Feria as they were travelling to the Château d'Amboise to meet Francis II of France and Mary, Queen of Scots. In the summer of 1560, Somers tried to meet Mary, Queen of Scots, in France, and obtain her ratification of the Treaty of Edinburgh. In September 1561, Somers wished to retire from his work with Throckmorton. Elizabeth had granted him a relatively modesty annuity of £20 in August 1560. Throckmorton recommended that Somers have the office of Clerk of the Signet.

Somers gained the office of a Clerk of the Signet as a successor to Gregory Railton (died 1561). Railton, a Marian exile, was a decipherer of coded letters, and a correspondent of John Knox. He was involved in negotiations with the Duke of Châtellerault and his son the Earl of Arran, Protestant leaders in Scotland in 1559. Railton was for many years Ralph Sadler's servant and "inward man". These were all colleagues and acquaintances, Robert Jones wrote a friendly joking letter to a friend at the English court in October 1560, mentioning his colleague Somers as a fellow player of the cithern, and listing their mutual friends including Railton.

In England, Somers showed some antique medals and coins to Cecil and Elizabeth I on approval, and Elizabeth (who was in St James's Park) was disinclined to hear Somers relate news of the Colloquy of Poissy, a conference intended to heal the religious divide in France. Elizabeth showed more interest in the coins, some were thought to be made from an alloy known as "aes Corinthium". They were presented in a gilt box lined with red velvet. Somers noted that Peter Meutas had been sent to Scotland. Meutas, like Somers, was given the fruitless task of requesting a ratification of the Treaty of Edinburgh. Elizabeth decided not to buy the medals. Somers and Jones met Carlo Ubertino Solaro, Count of Moretta, the ambassador from Savoy in November 1561.

In July 1578, as a depute to Francis Walsingham, he went to Mons to see the Duke of Alençon, and in August was involved with William Davison in arrangements to borrow money for the English crown from Benedict Spinola and Horatio Palavicino, in connection with the Second Union of Brussels. In July 1580, he congratulated Henry III of France on making peace with the Huguenots, and in 1581 he was involved in the Anjou courtship.

Somers was sent to the Low countries in March and April 1583, but declined Walsingham's invitation to join him in an embassy to Scotland in August 1583 due to illness, and in the same month he wrote a will. The historian and genealogist Edmund Lodge (1756–1839) was unable to discover details of Somers' family, and more recent writers have not yet traced his early career. His will mentions that he was born around the year 1525 and his father was Thomas Somers of Halstow, Kent.

Agnes Strickland characterised him as an "honest-hearted country gentleman" as much concerned with the repair of Rochester Bridge as affairs of state. Natalie Mears identifies him as a member of closely-knit second tier or "outer ring" of diplomats and advisers trusted to give counsel to Elizabeth I.

== Cipher keys and codework ==
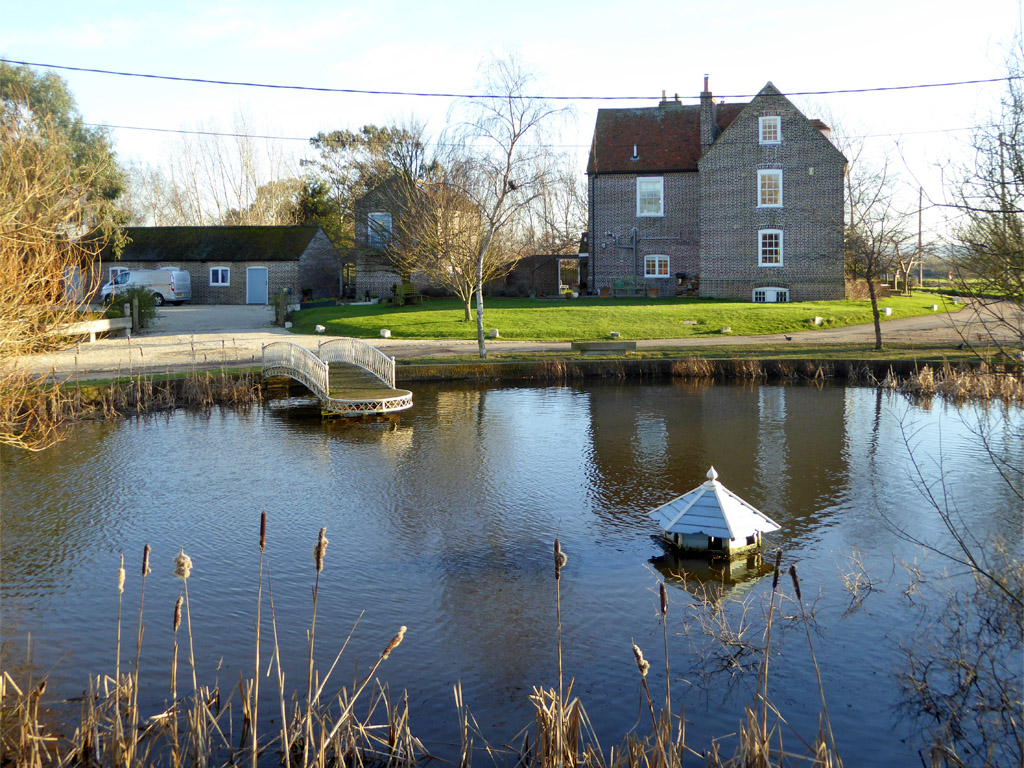
Newlands St Mary Hoo (later rebuilt) was one of the houses on John Somers' estate

Several letters in the National Archives mention Somers' work with ciphers in diplomatic correspondence. In April 1560, Somers deciphered a letter from the Duke and Cardinal of Lorraine to Mary of Guise for Thockmorton. Throckmorton had the text coded in his own usual cipher (or Elizabeth's "Queen's cipher") and sent it to Elizabeth, recommending Somers' codework. Later in the same month, the Duke of Norfolk wrote to William Cecil for a copy of an alphabet or cipher key made by Somers to decrypt French diplomatic correspondence. Norfolk wanted to try the key with intercepted coded letters sent from the French captains at the siege of Leith to Mary of Guise in Edinburgh Castle. Mary's half-brother, James Stewart, 1st Earl of Moray, a Protestant leader in Scotland, sent intercepted ciphered letters from the Guises to Cecil for decoding.

In May 1560, Throckmorton described Somers' work in Paris with a letter in cipher meant for Mary of Guise, Regent of Scotland. By Somers' diligence "the letter was cunningly made up again" and returned to a messenger. Throckmorton praised Somers and his colleague Robert Jones to Cecil for the decipherment, which "to discover was the crabbedest piece of work I ever saw". Cecil was in Edinburgh in June, in the days after the death of Mary of Guise, working on the Treaty. He forwarded a coded letter from a French secretary in Edinburgh Castle, hoping that Mr Hampton (Bernard Hampton) or "Mr Sommer" could decipher it. Cecil would have paid £100 to have Somers with him.

Bernard Hampton, Clerk to the Privy Council in three reigns (1551–1572), was fluent in several languages. He would later be involved in the Conferences about Scottish affairs in 1568, and drafting Cecil's "A necessary consideration of the perillous state of this tyme". In 1568, Somers was involved in the examination of the Casket Letters. Some documents related to the Conferences and a translation of one of the letters seem to be in his handwriting.

During the "lang siege" of Edinburgh Castle in 1573, Henry Killigrew (Somers' former companion in Paris), suggested sending intercepted letters to Somers, if one of the schoolmasters of James VI could not decipher them. Some ciphered letters from the castle found with Archibald Douglas during the Marian Civil War were deciphered by a schoolmaster in Leith, or a Mr Peters.

In July 1581, Walsingham sent Somers an intercepted letter of Mary, Queen of Scots, entirely written in code. Elizabeth had requested that Somers decipher it. In October 1582, Walsingham forwarded another letter for Somers to decipher, sent from Mary to the Archbishop of Glasgow in Paris. Walsingham wrote from Windsor with his request:

To my very loving frend, Mr John Sommers
Sir, th'enclosed letter in cipher is, as we doe gesse, from the Q of Scottes to the B. of Glasco, which Hir Majesty would have you to have a speciall care to decypher.

In November 1581, Somers discussed the interrogation of Archibald Douglas by Walsingham with Elizabeth. Douglas asserted that the queen was threatened by some near her in England.

=== Cipher work ===
Somers was able to determine from an intercepted ciphered text forwarded to him by Walsingham in April 1584 that its author was Scottish, and used to writing with the orthography of the Scots language, even though the source text was in French. Somers made suggestions or "significative notes" on the meanings of symbols used in the text to identify people. Walsingham had also sent this text to another codeworker Thomas Phelippes. Phelippes valued Somers as a senior colleague, on one occasion writing that "Mr Sommer" would be a judge of his "imperfect lines" deciphered from encrypted faulty Latin. When charges were prepared against Mary, Queen of Scots, for her trial at Fotheringhay in 1586, evidence included her "most despitefull letter" deciphered by "Mr Sommer".

A collection of cipher keys in the National Archives, attributed to John Somers by the archivist Robert Lemon (1800–1867), includes a key for a code used by the French diplomat Antoine de Noailles during Wyatt's rebellion in 1554. There are also keys for the correspondence of Mary of Guise and Henri Cleutin during the crisis of the Scottish Reformation and the siege of Leith. Robert Lemon was Senior Clerk of the State Paper Office, and involved in arranging the British state papers and the publication of calendars summarising their contents.

== Conversation at Sheffield ==
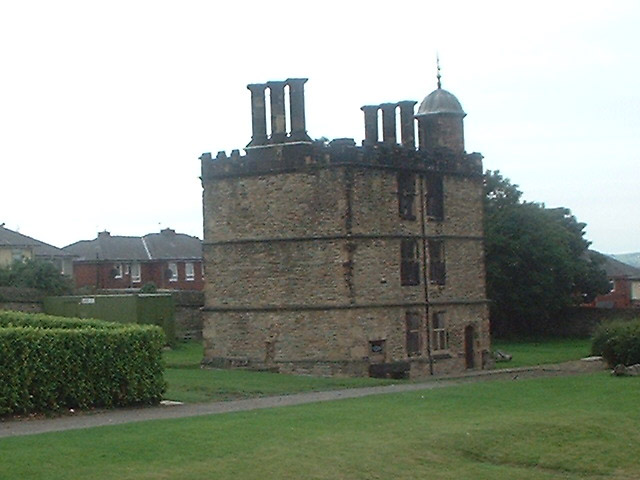
Sheffield Manor Lodge

Somers was appointed to be Ralph Sadler's assistant as custodian of Mary, Queen of Scots, on 12 August 1584. He called Sadler "Mr Chancellor", referring to his office for the Duchy of Lancaster. They were to take the place of the Earl of Shrewsbury, who was to come to the royal court in London.

In conversation at Sheffield, Somers told Mary that Queen Elizabeth was troubled by Scots landing in Ireland to fight the English, encouraged by "great ones" in Scotland. Somers thought that this was an impediment to Mary and her son James VI receiving Elizabeth's favour. Mary said she knew nothing about the landings, but if James VI knew he had Elizabeth's good will, he would do his best to help and even send troops to support the English in Ireland. The conversation was made in the context of Mary's hopes that she would be recognised as a joint ruler of Scotland with her son, a scheme known as the "Association". Somers wrote to William Cecil, describing Mary's expressions of despair at her long predicament and failing health on their "removing day" from Sheffield.

== Journey to Wingfield ==
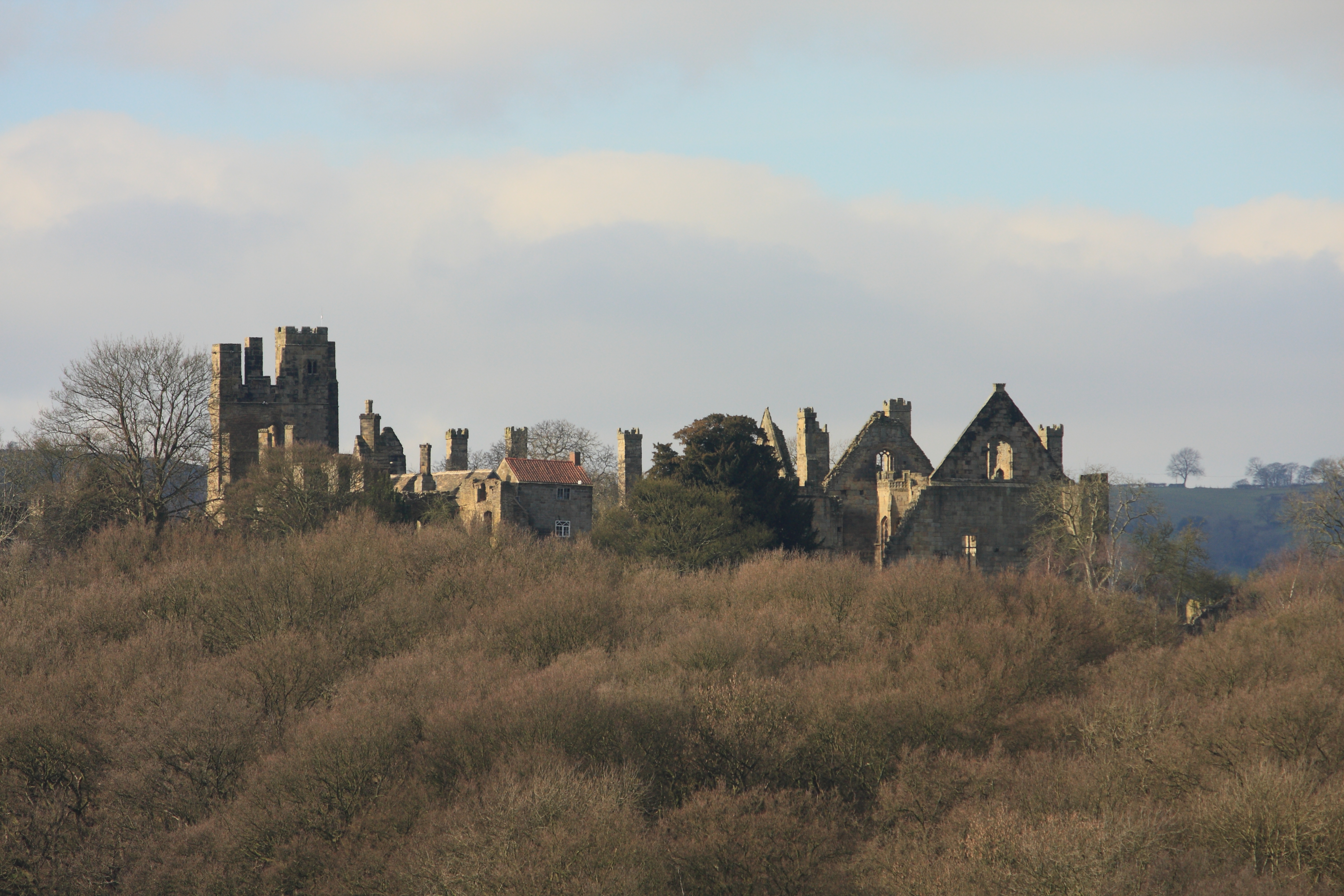
Wingfield Manor

In September, Somers accompanied Mary, Queen of Scots, as she travelled from Sheffield to Wingfield Manor. He wrote a report of their conversations on the way. Somers asked her about the "enterprise", rumoured plans for her rescue and the invasion of England, which were mentioned in the letter he had deciphered for Walsingham back in April. According to Somers, she replied:

"And as to the enterprise you spoke of, by my troth, I knew not nor heard any thing of it; nor so God have my soule, will ever consent any thing that shulde truble this state, wherof I seek the quiet with all my heart; for if any unquietnes shuld happen heere; it wold be layd to my charge, and so I might be in greater danger.

On 7 September, Mary wrote to French ambassador in London, Michel de Castelnau, mentioning that she was pleased that Elizabeth had appointed Sadler and Somers during the Earl of Shrewsbury's absence in London.

== The carrier's man ==
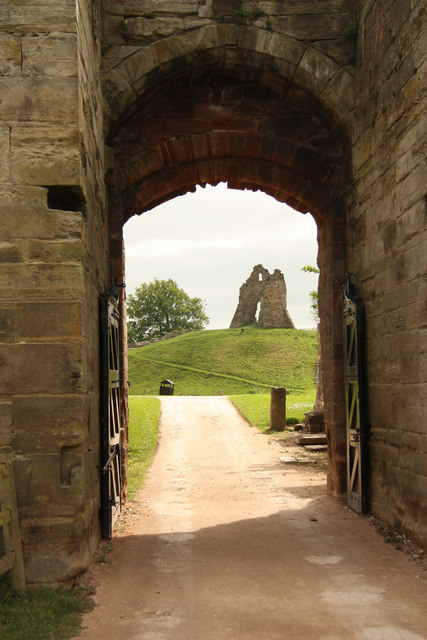
Tutbury Castle

Mary's Scottish secretary Gilbert Curle set up a code for correspondence apparently disguising Sadler's name as "the carrier" and Somers as "the carrier's man", the Earl of Shrewsbury was "the peddler". Curle could then write letters to Thomas Baldwin, a servant of the Earl of Shrewsbury, that might pass as unsuspicious mercantile correspondence.

Sadler inspected an intercepted letter in October 1584 and thought the identifications were not entirely correct. Somers seemed to be implicated in the secretary's schemes, and Curle claimed the "carrier" and "carrier's man" disliked Bess of Hardwick. Sadler reported to Walsingham that he and Somers were angry with Curle for letting them down or betraying them, and Somers had not been turned or compromised, but was "a perfect honest faithful and good servant to her majesty (Elizabeth), whereof he hath showed a good proof and trial by his former service".

Baldwin was sent to the Tower of London. His work for the Earl of Shrewsbury had included raising funds for keeping Mary, brokering the Earl's investment in a voyage to America planned by Christopher Carleill, and buying clothes and furnishings. The Earl wrote his name as "Bawdewyn". Baldwin carved graffiti in his cell in Beauchamp's Tower in July 1585. He was released after three years. Baldwin inherited Elsich Manor at Diddlebury.

Somers himself wrote to Walsingham, as a conceit taking on the persona of the "carrier's man" and entering his soul. In his letter, Somers described his discussion with Mary in the Great Chamber at Wingfield, on various topics including sending her French secretary Claude Nau as her diplomat to the English court, and the potential marriage of James VI to candidates including the "second daughter of Lorraine" (Antonia of Lorraine rather than Christina of Lorraine) and other possible brides.

== At Tutbury ==
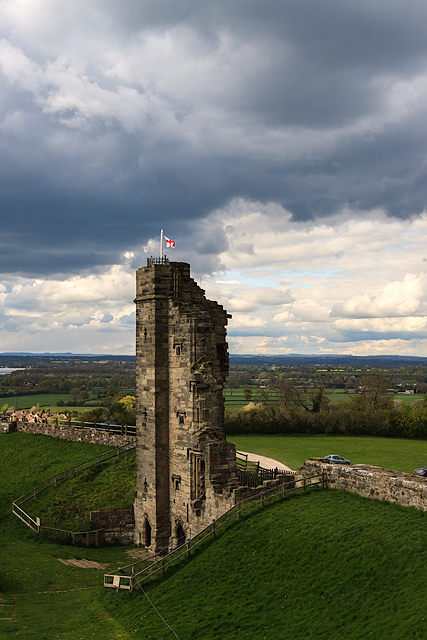
Tutbury Castle

Mary found her bedding at Tutbury was old and stained, and she exchanged her mattress with Somers. He was involved in furnishing a bedchamber for Mary. He wrote to William Cecil about the requirements. Mary wanted a pavillon, which was a tent of tapestry over her bed, "doble lyned with canvas for her chamber", presumably for warmth and to guard against draughts. There was some confusion in their correspondence over this tapestry tent and the French words Mary used for it. Somers drew a diagram of the room for Cecil. The bed chamber, heated by a fireplace to the left of Mary's bed, was at the top of timber-framed building built against the curtain wall with a view over the internal court. It no longer exists.

Somers bought a plain hard-wearing wool and linen fabric called dornick or dornix at Coventry in February 1584 for hangings and curtains in the lodgings. The cloth was suitable to cover a billiard table for Mary. He created a garden for Mary at Tutbury, an enclosure made with wooden palings. Mary complained to the diplomats Castelnau and Châteauneuf that Somers's work was more like a pig run than anything that might be called a garden, "plus propre à garder des pourceaux qu'à porter le nom de jardin".

In March 1585, Somers, (or Sadler), delivered a letter to Mary brought from Scotland by Lewis Bellenden, in which her son James VI declined to join her in the "Association", a plan for her to return to power with him as a joint ruler.

Sadler and Somers both wrote to Walsingham in March, defending their decision to allow Mary to ride and fly her hawks outside the castle. In April, Walsingham wrote to Somers reminding him of the need to intercept and examine letters arriving at Tutbury, especially from Scotland. Somers replied that carriers delivering letters were searched. Mary's French secretary Claude Nau inspected the seals of incoming packets of letters, to check if they had been tampered with. Somers obtained and deciphered at least one outgoing letter from Mary considered to be incriminating.

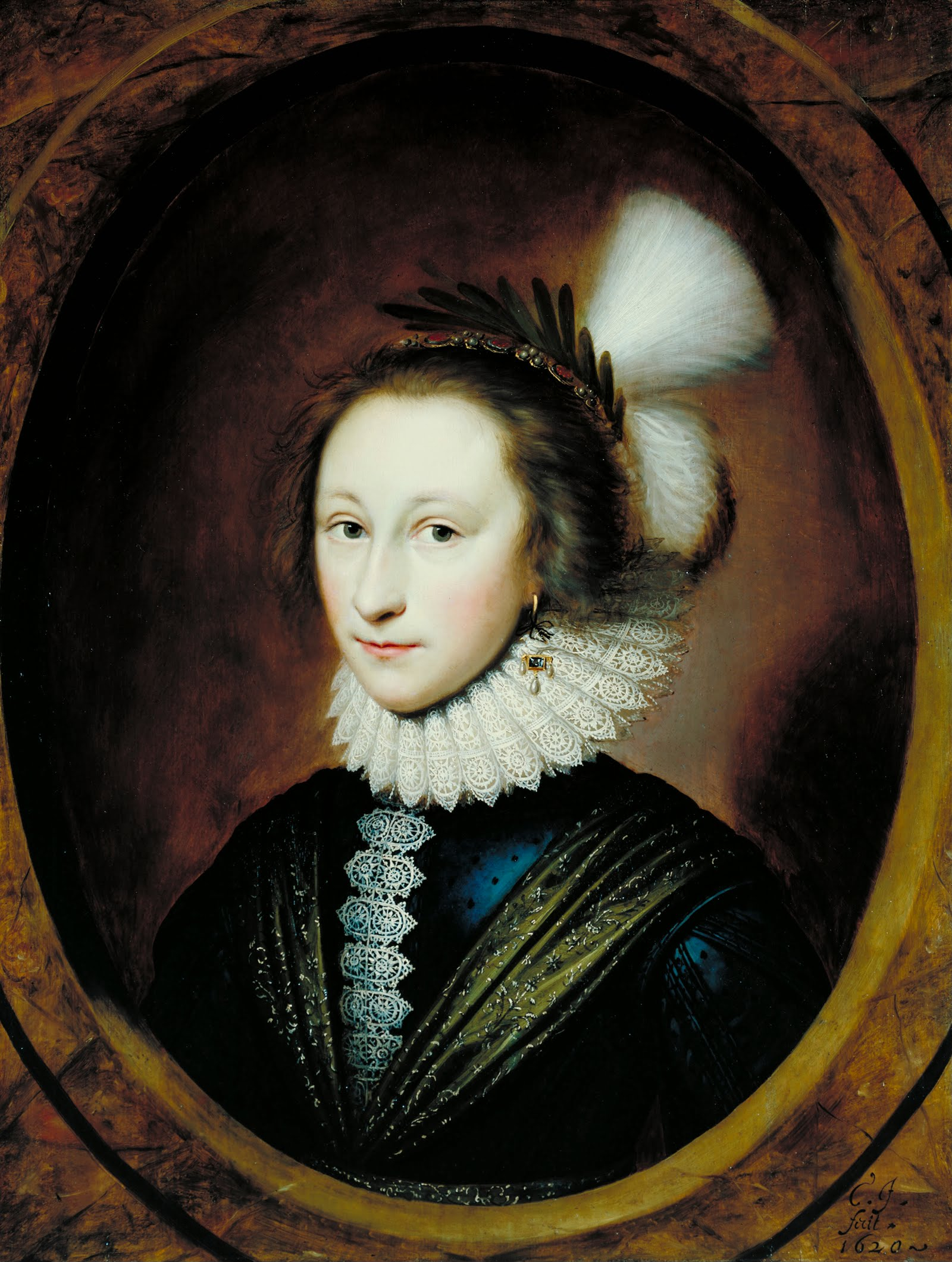
Susanna Temple, John Somers' granddaughter, Cornelius Johnson

While he remained at Tutbury, Somers gave the new keeper Amias Paulet details of routines and the backgrounds of the servants, including the three English laundrywomen. Somers received the brunt of Mary's more serious complaints as Paulet began to make changes in April 1585. Mary's servants told him that she suffered by Paulet's "rigours and alterations", including the removal of her cloth of estate, symbolic of majesty, from the Great Chamber used for dining.

Paulet wrote to Walsingham that he had discussed the cloth of estate with Claude Nau in the presence of John Somers, and offered that Mary could have it set up in the dining room she regularly used, (which was next to her attic bed chamber). Paulet wrote that the blame for the controversy lay with himself, "Mr Somer beareth the blame in words, but the grudge and displeasure is against me".

=== Fleet Street ===
Somers left Tutbury on 10 May 1585. In June, Paulet was amused to find a letter from Castelnau to Mary that mentioned Walsingham and Somers as "friendly furtherers" of her cause. Somers seems to have been in London, where he owned a house on Fleet Street, analysing the French ambassador's correspondence.

Somers died later in 1585, the exact date is unknown, and his will was proved in November. Thomas Phelippes joined the custodians of Mary, Queen of Scots, at Chartley.

== Death ==
Somers seems also to have been involved with Amias Paulet in making an inventory of Mary's jewels and apparel, according to an endorsement on a letter of Paulet's.

John Somer's will was proved in November 1585. Somers left half a dozen spoons with big knops to the diplomat Thomas Randolph. John Somers was buried at Rochester Cathedral. John Manningham noted some details from the inscription of the now destroyed tomb.

== Family and children ==
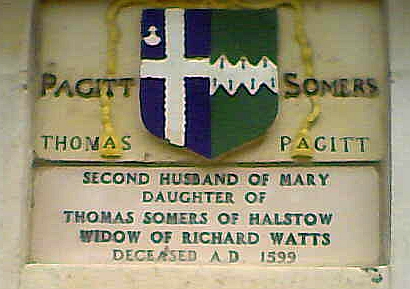
Plaque at the Richard Watts Almshouse

John Somers had a brother, William, who died in 1607 and was buried at Halstow. His sister Mary or Marian married Richard Watts (died 1579), and secondly Thomas Paget or Pagitt (died 1599). Richard Watts, who was victualler of the navy, founded by his will an almshouse in Rochester, situated from 1586 in The Six Poor Travellers House. One document of the charity explains that it was "devised by Mr Watts and assured by Mr Tho. Pagitt and Maryan their wyfe".

Somers married Martine Ridge, daughter of Edward Ridge (died 1570) and widow of Thomas Colepeper. Her sister Margaret was married to Derrick Anthony of Chertsey. John Somers had two daughters who survived to be co-heirs of the family estate at Halstow and St Mary Hoo, and a house on Fleet Street inherited from their grandfather Edward Ridge:

- Frances Somers (died 1597), who married James Cromer of Tunstall (died 1613), their daughter Frances Cromer married Sir Matthew Carew, the younger, a brother of the poet Thomas Carew.
- Mary Somers of Newlands (St Mary Hoo), who married Thomas Penystone of Dean, and secondly Alexander Temple of Longhouse, Chadwell St Mary, Essex. She was the mother of Sir Thomas Penyston, 1st Baronet, James Temple and Susanna Temple.
