= John Noble (MP) =

English politician

John Noble (fl. 1417–1427) of Salisbury, Wiltshire, was an English politician.

== Family ==
His wife was named Lucy. She died in September or October 1402. They shared a house in Castle Street, Salisbury. Nothing further is known of his family.

== Career ==
He was a Member (MP) of the Parliament of England for Old Sarum in 1417. He was Mayor of Salisbury in 1426–27. His main occupation is unrecorded, but he may have been a wool merchant.

Parliament of England
Preceded by ? ?	Member of Parliament for Old Sarum; 1417; With: John Giles	Succeeded by ? ?
