= Thomas Hilton =

Thomas Hilton may refer to:

- Thomas Hilton (by 1500 – 1559), MP for Northumberland
- Thomas Hilton (by 1508 – 1558 or later), MP for Old Sarum
- Thomas Hilton, see List of colonial governors of New Hampshire
