= Hulcote =

Hulcote may refer to:

Places

- Hulcote, Bedfordshire, a village in Bedfordshire, England
- Hulcote, Northamptonshire, England
- Hulcote and Salford, a civil parish in Bedfordshire, England

People

- William Hulcote, 16th-century member of the English parliament
