= Bletchingdon Park =

Country house in Oxfordshire, England

Coordinates: 51.8586°N 1.2676°W

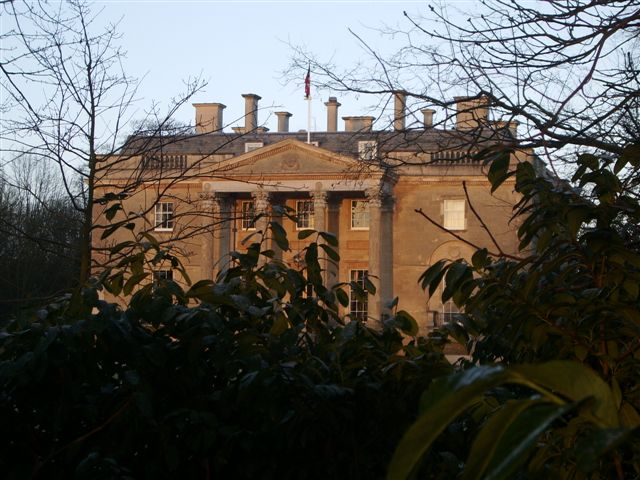
Bletchingdon Park

Bletchington Park is a Grade II* listed Palladian country house in Bletchingdon, Oxfordshire, England.

== History ==
Bletchington's medieval manor house was rebuilt by Sir Thomas Coghill in about 1630. It was fortified and garrisoned by 200 Cavaliers under Colonel Francis Windebank during the First English Civil War, before being over-run by Roundheads during Cromwell's raid in 1644. The Coghill family sold it to Lord Valentia in 1716.

The present house is a Palladian country house built in 1782 next to the parish church by James Lewis for Arthur Annesley, 5th Earl of Anglesey (also the 6th Viscount Valentia). Bletchington village was originally built around a green, but the houses on the north side were pulled down when Bletchingdon Park was extended.

The estate remained in the Valentia family until 1948, when Lord Valentia sold it to the Hon. William Astor, who resold it in 1953 to the Hon. Robin Cayzer, later Lord Rotherwick. In 1975, Bletchington Park was purchased by Dr. Mahmoud Araboff, who established an English language institute on the estate. In 1990, the estate was purchased by John Patterson, the founder of Dateline computer dating. In 1993, the estate was bought by Dr. Michael Peagram, a chemicals industrialist and philanthropist, who had the house historically restored. In 2012, the 22,600-square-foot house was listed for sale at a price of 20 million pounds.
