= John Nicholas (1624–1705) =

Historical British politician

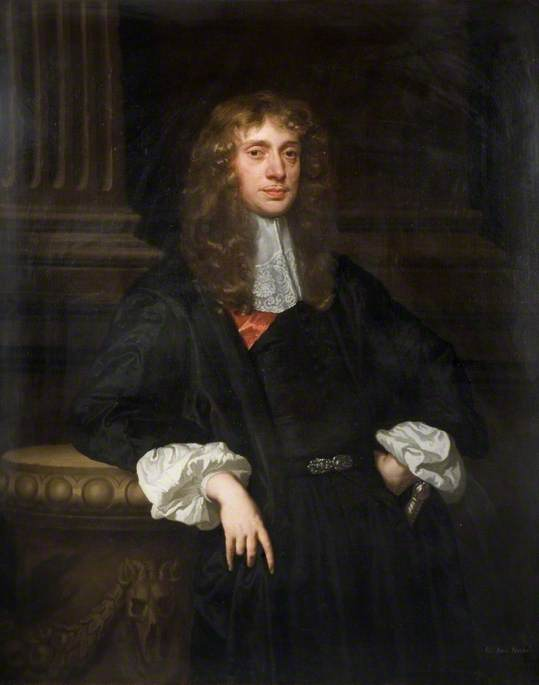
Sir John Nicholas, painting by Peter Lely, 1667.

Sir John Nicholas (1624 – 9 Jan 1705) was an English courtier and member of parliament.

He was born the eldest son of Sir Edward Nicholas of Winterbourne Earls, Wiltshire, who was a Secretary of State under Charles I and Charles II. After being educated both privately and at Winchester College (1637–40) and Queen's College, Oxford (1641) he spent some time travelling abroad in France before entering the Middle Temple in 1647 to study law.

He was appointed Clerk of the Signet in 1655 and Clerk of the Privy Council in 1660, holding both positions for life, and in 1661 was created a Knight of the Bath. He also served as a justice of the peace for both Wiltshire and Surrey, and as a Commissioner of Assessment for several counties. He was Keeper of Windsor Great Park from 1669 to 1671 and Deputy Lieutenant of Dorset from 1672 to 1674.

In 1661 he was elected to the Cavalier Parliament for Ripon, Wilton and West Looe, choosing to sit for Ripon and holding the seat until 1679. He was then elected to serve in three consecutive Parliaments for Wilton, sitting until 1687.

He inherited his father's West Horsley estate in Surrey in 1669. He died in 1705 and was buried at West Horsley. He had married Lady Penelope Compton, the daughter of Spencer Compton, 2nd Earl of Northampton, and with her had three sons and a daughter.
