= Edmund Fortescue (died 1624) =

Member of the Parliament of England

- Arms of Fortescue: Azure, a bend engrailed argent plain cotised or

Member of Parliament for Old Sarum
- Incumbent
- Assumed office 1593

Sheriff of Devon
- In office 1622–1623

Personal details
- Born: 1560
- Died: 1624 (aged 63–64)
- Spouse: Mary Champernown
- Parent: John Fortescue

Edmund Fortescue (1560–1624) of Fallapit in the parish of East Allington, Devon, was an English Member of Parliament.

== Origins ==
He was the eldest son and heir of John Fortescue (1525-1595) of Fallapit (whose monumental brass survives in East Allington Church) by his wife Honora Speccot, a daughter of Edmund Speccot (1499-1557) of Speccot, in the parish of Merton, Devon, and succeeded his father in 1595.

== Career ==
He was elected a Member of Parliament for Old Sarum in 1593 and served as Sheriff of Devon for 1622–3.

== Marriage and children ==
He married Mary Champernown, a daughter of Henry Champernown of Modbury in Devon, by whom he had at least one son.

== Death and burial ==
He died in 1624 and was buried at East Allington, Devon.
