= Bartholomew Avery =

English politician

Bartholomew Avery (fl. 1378–1386) was an English politician. He sat as MP for Old Sarum in May 1382, October 1382, February 1383, and 1386.

He went surety for the attended of George Joce, MP for Old Sarum in 1378. He was likely related to John Avery.
