= William Pleydell =

William Pleydell was an English lawyer and politician who sat in the House of Commons from 1640 to 1644. He supported the Royalist cause in the English Civil War.

Pleydell was the son of Sir Charles Pleydell of Midgehall, Wiltshire and Kilburn Priory, Middlesex. In November 1640, he was elected Member of Parliament for Wootton Bassett. He supported the King in the Civil War and was disabled from sitting in February 1644.

Pleydell was the brother of John Pleydell who was later MP for Wootton Bassett.

Parliament of England
Preceded by Thomas Windebanke; Edward Hyde	Member of Parliament for Wootton Bassett; 1640–1644; With: Edward Poole	Succeeded by Edward Poole; Edward Massie
