= Old Sarum (constituency) =

Parliamentary constituency in the United Kingdom, 1295–1832

- Former borough constituency for the House of Commons
- County: Wiltshire
- Borough: Old Sarum

1295–1832
- Seats: 2

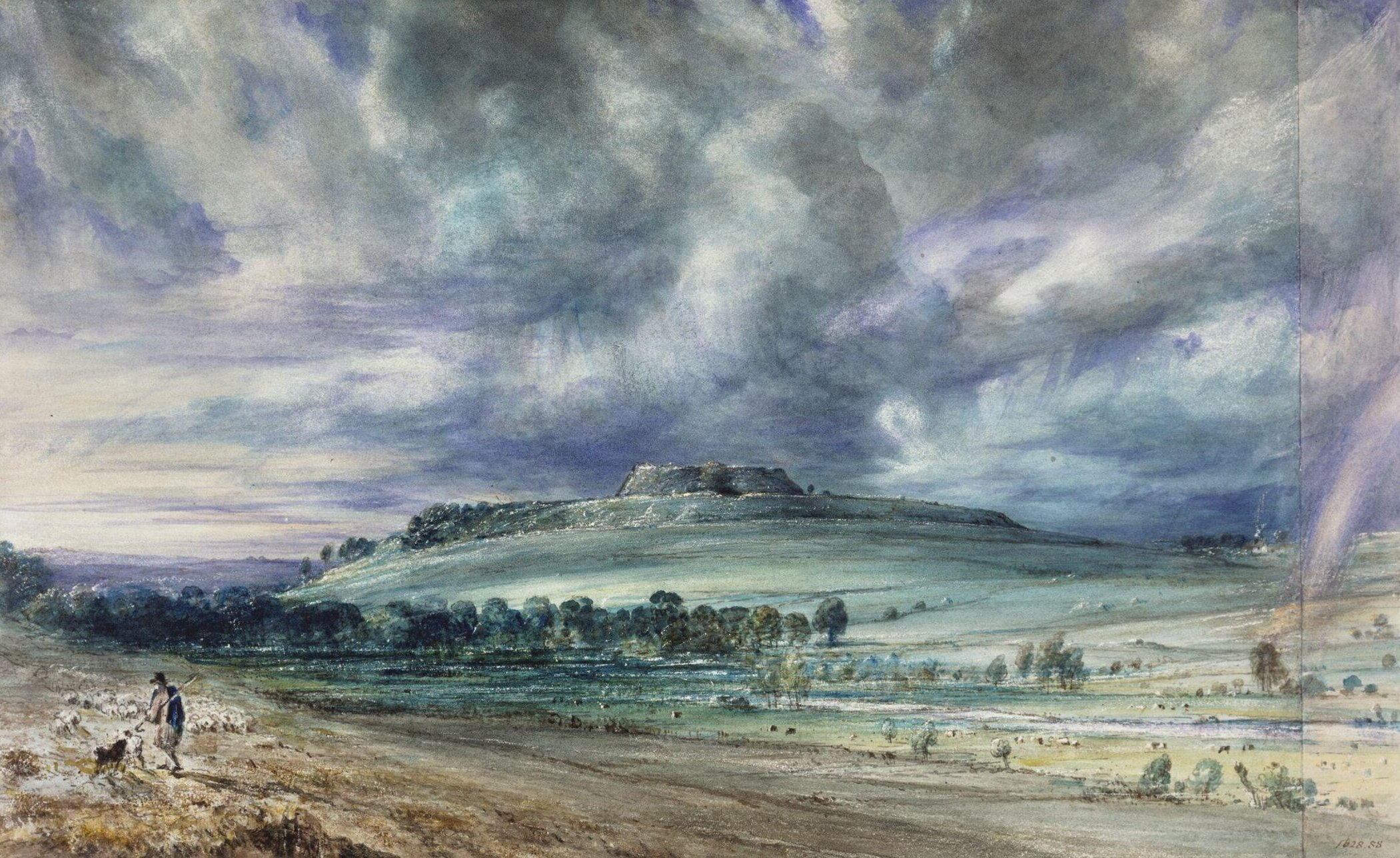
Old Sarum in Wiltshire, an uninhabited hill which elected two Members of Parliament. Old Sarum by John Constable, 1834.

Old Sarum was from 1295 until 1832 a parliamentary constituency of England, Great Britain (until 1800), and the United Kingdom of Great Britain and Ireland. It was a so-called rotten borough, with an extremely small electorate that was consequently vastly over-represented and could be used by a patron in gaining such undue influence. The constituency was on the site of what had been the original settlement of Salisbury, known as Old Sarum. The population and cathedral city had moved in the 14th century to New Sarum, at the foot of the Old Sarum hill. It became one of the more notorious constituencies in the unreformed House of Commons and was abolished under the Reform Act 1832.

== History ==
In 1295, during the reign of King Edward I, Old Sarum was given the right to send two members to the House of Commons of England even though the site had ceased to be a city with the dissolution of Old Sarum Cathedral in 1226. The seat of the Bishop had moved to New Salisbury – and the location of the new cathedral – in 1217–18. All that remained at Old Sarum was a small hamlet. But that was largely abandoned when Edward II ordered the castle's demolition in 1322. The remains of the old settlement were razed for its materials that were used to construct the new city and Salisbury Cathedral. Evidence of quarrying showed it continued well into the 14th century. Two hundred years later Henry VIII sold the former Royal Castle to Thomas Compton.

Despite having no significant population, the borough was organised with a burgage franchise, meaning that the inhabitants of designated houses (burgage tenements) had the right to vote. From at least the 17th century, Old Sarum had no resident voters, but the landowner retained the right to nominate tenants for each of the burgage plots, and they were not required to live there. For many years, the borough was owned by the Pitt family and was their pocket borough: one of its Members in the late 18th century was William Pitt the Elder. In 1802, the head of the family, Lord Camelford, sold the borough to the Earl of Caledon, who owned it until its abolition; the price was reported as £60,000, even though the land and manorial rights were worth £700 a year at most: an indication of the value of a pair of parliamentary seats. At its final election, in 1831, there were eleven voters, all of whom were landowners who lived elsewhere. This made Old Sarum the most notorious of the rotten boroughs, being described as "a wall with two niches". The Reform Act 1832 subsumed the Old Sarum area into an enlarged borough of Wilton.

In the last years, the spectacle of an Old Sarum election drew a small crowd to observe the ritual presentation of the two candidates and the hollow call for any further nominations. Stooks Smith quotes a contemporary description dating from the 1802 general election:

This election for the borough of Old Sarum was held in a temporary booth erected in a cornfield, under a tree which marked the former boundary of the old town, not a vestige of which has been standing in the memory of man, the several burgages which give the right of voting, being now without a dwelling for a human being. Mr Dean, the bailiff of the borough having read the precept for the election, and caused proclamation thereof, read the bribery act, and gone through all the legal ceremonies, the Rev. Dr Skinner rose and nominated Nicholas Vansittart, and Henry Alexander, Esq., from a thorough conviction that their public conduct would be such as would give satisfaction and do honour to their constituents. The other electors acquiescing in this nomination and no other candidates offering, the proclamation was thrice made for any gentleman disposed to do so, to come forward, the bailiff declared the above two gentlemen to be duly elected. There were five electors present at this election, (beside the bailiff of the borough who lives at Wimborne) viz, the Rev. Dr. Skinner, of the Close; the Rev. Mr. Burrough, of Abbot's Ann; William Dyke, Esq., of Syrencot; Mr. Massey and Mr. Brunsdon, both occupiers of land within the limits of the borough. The above account is thus particularly given to rectify several prevalent mistakes relative to this celebrated borough, and to show that the election is conducted in a manner every way consonant to the law of the land and the constitution of Parliament.

=== Place of election ===
Elections in Old Sarum were conducted on a mobile hustings under a specific tree, which died in 1905, in what was known as the "electing acre".

== Members of Parliament ==
=== 1295–1640 ===
Parliament	First member	Second member
1386	Walter Upton	Bartholomew Avery
1388 (Feb)	Walter Upton	John Avery I
1388 (Sep)	Walter Upton	John Avery I
1390 (Jan)		
1390 (Nov)		
1391		
1393		
1394	John Avery I	John Chipplegh
1395	John Avery I	Robert Page
1397 (Jan)		
1397 (Sep)	John Avery I	Robert Page
1399		
1414 (Apr)	Robert Long	William Chesterton
1414 (Nov)		
1415		
1416 (Mar)		
1416 (Oct)		
1417	John Giles	John Noble
1419		
1420		
1421 (May)	Henry Bradley	John Ludwell
1421 (Dec)	John Fruysthorp	John Ludwell
1423	John Everard	
1435	Henry Long	
1442	Richard Long	
1510–1523	No names known	
1529	Thomas Hilton	William Lambert
1536	?	
1539	?	
1542	?	
1545	William Hulcote	John Bassett
1547	John Young	?
by Jan 1552	William Thomas	
1553 (Mar)	James Brande	William Wekys
1553 (Oct)	Sir Nicholas Throckmorton	John Throckmorton
1554 (Apr)	Richard Clipper	Edmund Twyneho
1554 (Nov)	John Tull	Francis Killinghall
1555	John Marshe	William Chamber
1558	Sir Henry Jones	John Bateman
1559	John Harington	Henry Hart
1562–3	Edward Herbert	Henry Compton
1571	John Young	Edmund Ludlow
1572	Hugh Powell	John Frenche
1584	Richard Topcliffe	Roger Gifford
1586	Edward Berkeley	Richard Topcliffe
1588–9	Roger Gifford	Henry Baynton I
1593	Anthony Ashley	Edmund Fortescue
1597	William Blaker	Nicholas Hyde
1601	Robert Turner	Henry Hyde
1604–1611	William Ravenscroft	Edward Leache
1614	William Ravenscroft	William Price
1621–1622	George Myne	Thomas Brett
1624	Sir Robert Cotton	Sir Arthur Ingram, sat for York and repl. by Michael Oldisworth
1625	Michael Oldisworth	Sir John Stradling
1626	Michael Oldisworth	Sir Benjamin Rudyerd
1628	Michael Oldisworth	Christopher Keightley
1629–1640	No Parliaments summoned	

=== 1640–1832 ===
Year	First member	First party	Second member	Second party
April 1640	Sir William Howard		Edward Herbert	Royalist
November 1640	Hon. Robert Cecil	Parliamentarian	Edward Herbert	Royalist
1641	Hon. Robert Cecil	Parliamentarian	Sir William Savile	Royalist
September 1642	Hon. Robert Cecil	Parliamentarian	Savile disabled from sitting – seat vacant	
1646	Hon. Robert Cecil	Parliamentarian	Roger Kirkham	
1647	Hon. Robert Cecil	Parliamentarian	Sir Richard Lucy	
December 1648	Cecil not recorded as sitting after Pride's Purge		Sir Richard Lucy	
1653	Old Sarum was unrepresented in the Barebones Parliament and the First and Second Parliaments of the Protectorate			
January 1659	Richard Hill		William Ludlow	
May 1659	Old Sarum was not represented in the restored Rump			
April 1660	Seymour Bowman		John Norden	
1661	Edward Nicholas		John Denham	
1669	Edward Nicholas		Sir Eliab Harvey	
February 1679	Eliab Harvey		John Young	
August 1679	The Lord Coleraine		Sir Eliab Harvey	
1681	Sir Thomas Mompesson		Sir Eliab Harvey	
January 1689	John Young		Thomas Pitt	
March 1689	William Harvey		John Hawles	
1690	William Harvey		Sir Thomas Mompesson	
1695	William Harvey		Thomas Pitt	
1698	William Harvey		Charles Mompesson	
1705	Robert Pitt		Charles Mompesson	
1708	Robert Pitt		William Harvey	
1710	Thomas Pitt		William Harvey	
1713	Thomas Pitt		Robert Pitt	
1716	Sir William Strickland, Bt	Whig	Robert Pitt	
March 1722	Thomas Pitt		Robert Pitt	
November 1722	Thomas Pitt		George Morton Pitt	
1724	Thomas Pitt		John Pitt	
1726	George Pitt		John Pitt	
1727	Thomas Pitt of Boconnoc		The Earl of Londonderry	
March 1728	Matthew St Quintin		The Earl of Londonderry	
May 1728	Matthew St Quintin		Thomas Harrison	
1734	Thomas Pitt of Boconnoc		Robert Nedham	
1735	William Pitt		Robert Nedham	
1741	William Pitt		George Lyttelton	
1742	William Pitt		James Grenville	
May 1747	William Pitt		Edward Willes	
July 1747	Thomas Pitt of Boconnoc		Sir William Irby, Bt	
December 1747	Earl of Middlesex		The Viscount Doneraile	
January 1751	Earl of Middlesex		Paul Jodrell	
November 1751	Earl of Middlesex		Simon Fanshawe	
1754	Viscount Pulteney		Thomas Pitt of Boconnoc	
1755	Viscount Pulteney		Sir William Calvert	
March 1761	Thomas Pitt of Boconnoc		Howell Gwynne	
December 1761	Thomas Pitt (the younger)		Howell Gwynne	
1768	William Gerard Hamilton		John Craufurd	
1774	Pinckney Wilkinson		Thomas Pitt (the younger)	
January 1784	Pinckney Wilkinson		The Hon. John Villiers	
March 1784	George Hardinge		The Hon. John Villiers	
1790	George Hardinge		John Sullivan	
1796	George Hardinge		The Earl of Mornington	
1797	George Hardinge		Charles Williams-Wynn	
1799	George Hardinge		Sir George Yonge	
1801	George Hardinge		Rev. John Horne Tooke	Radical
1802	Nicholas Vansittart	Tory	Henry Alexander	Tory
1806	Nicholas Vansittart	Tory	The Lord Blayney	
1807	Nicholas Vansittart	Tory	Josias Porcher	Tory
1812	James Alexander	Tory	Josias Porcher	Tory
1818	James Alexander	Tory	Arthur Johnston Crawford	Tory
1820	James Alexander	Tory	Josias Alexander	Tory
1828	James Alexander	Tory	Stratford Canning	Tory
1830	James Alexander	Tory	Josias Alexander	Tory

== Elections ==
The last reported contested election in Old Sarum occurred at a by-election in November 1751, after the death of Paul Jodrell. The proprietor at the time, Thomas Pitt, had sold the privilege of choosing the Members to the Pelham Government for £2,000 and a pension of £1,000 a year, but the administration's choice of Simon Fanshawe was opposed by James Pitt (younger brother of George Pitt, Member for Dorset) and by John Thorold. The number of votes for each candidate was not recorded.

== Notes and references ==
Notes
