= John Hawkins (MP) =

English politician

John Hawkins (born c 1611) was an English politician who sat in the House of Commons in 1659.

Hawkins was the son of Henry Hawkins of Ashton Canes, Wiltshire. He matriculated at Oriel College, Oxford on 22 November 1639, aged 18. In 1659, he was elected Member of Parliament for Cricklade in the Third Protectorate Parliament.

Parliament of England
Preceded by Not represented in Second Protectorate Parliament	Member of Parliament for Cricklade; 1659; With: Edward Poole	Succeeded by Not represented in Restored Rump
