= Edward Poole =

English politician (1617–1673)

Sir Edward Poole (1617 – 1673) was an English politician who sat in the House of Commons at various times between 1640 and 1673.

Poole was the eldest son of Sir Neville Poole of Kemble and his first wife Frances Poole, daughter of Sir Henry Poole of Saperton, Gloucestershire. He matriculated at Magdalen Hall, Oxford on 8 May 1635, aged 18. He entered Lincoln's Inn in 1636.

In November 1640, Poole was elected Member of Parliament for Wootton Bassett in the Long Parliament. He was a commissioner for sequestration for Wiltshire in 1643 and a commissioner for assessment for Wiltshire from 1643 to 1648 In 1647 he became commissioner for appeals for Oxford University and in 1648 commissioner for militia in Wiltshire. He was excluded from parliament in 1648 under Pride's Purge.

In 1659, Poole was elected MP for Cricklade in the Third Protectorate Parliament. He was a commissioner for militia in March 1660 and became lieutenant-colonel of the Militia in April 1660. He also became a J.P. for Wiltshire in March 1660. In April 1660, he was elected MP for Chippenham for the Convention Parliament. He was knighted by 9 July 1660. He was a commissioner for assessment from August 1660 until his death and colonel of horse from 1661 to his death. He inherited the family estates of Oaksey or Oxsey, Wiltshire from his father in 1661. In 1668 he was elected MP for Malmesbury in a by-election to the Cavalier Parliament. He became a Deputy Lieutenant in 1668. He died during the summer recess in 1673.

Poole married Dorothy Pye, daughter of Sir Robert Pye of Faringdon, Berkshire after a settlement on 29 May 1638. They had four sons and a daughter.

Parliament of England
| Preceded by Thomas Windebanke; Edward Hyde | Member of Parliament for Wootton Bassett; 1640–1648; With: William Pleydell 1640–1644; Edward Massie 1645–1648 | Succeeded by Not represented in Rump Parliament |
| Preceded by Not represented in Second Protectorate Parliament | Member of Parliament for Cricklade; 1659; With: John Hawkins | Succeeded by Not represented in Restored Rump |
