= The Sophy =

1641 revenge tragedy by Sir John Denham

- Written by: Sir John Denham
- Genre: Revenge tragedy

Premiere
- Date: 1641

The Sophy is a revenge tragedy in blank verse written by Sir John Denham and first acted in 1641.

== Characters ==
- Abbas, King of Persia.
- Mirza, the Prince, his Son.
- Erythæa, the Princess, his Wife.
- Enemies to the Prince:
  - Haly, the King's Favourite.
  - Mirvan, Haly's Confident.
- Two Lords, Friends to the Prince:
  - Abdall,
  - Morat,
- Caliph.
- Solyman, a foolish Courtier.
- Soffy, the Prince his Son, now King of Persia.
- Fatyma, his Daughter.
- 2 Turkish Bashaw(e)s.
- 3 Captains.
- 2 Women.
- Physician,
- Tormentors.

== Background ==
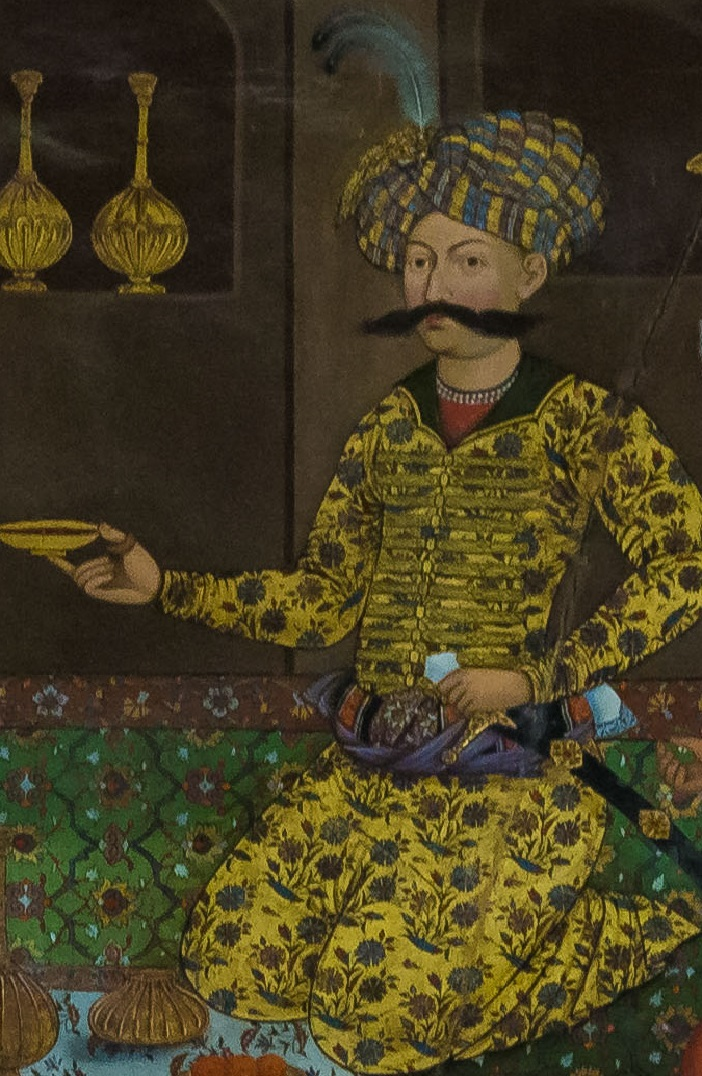
Abbas the Great

"In 1642 he broke out", as Denham's contemporary Edmund Waller remarks of him, "like the Irish Rebellion, threescore thousand strong, when nobody was aware, or in the least suspected it", in the play of the Sophy.

== Source ==
Denham's source is Sir Thomas Herbert's account of the life of Abbas the Great of Persia in Some Yeares Travels into Divers Parts of Asia and Afrique, first published in 1634.

== Synopsis ==
A father suspecting and plotting against a dear and noble son; a son deprived of sight by the command of a father, and meditating in his rage and revenge the murder of his own favourite daughter, because she is beloved by his father; and the deaths of both son and father by poison, administered through means of a courtier who has betrayed both. Such are the main hinges on which the plot of the piece turns.

== Sources ==
- Denham, John (1668). Poems and Translations with the Sophy. London: Printed for H. Herringman, &c.
- Feinberg, Anat (1980). "The Perspective of Fear in Sir John Denham's The Sophy". Studia Neophilologica, 52(2): pp. 311–322.
- Gilfillan, George (1857). The Poetical Works of Edmund Waller and Sir John Denham. Edinburgh: John Nichol; London: James Nisbet & Co. pp. 204–210.
- Herbert Thomas (1638). Some Yeares Travels into Divers Parts of Asia and Afrique. London: Printed by R[ichard] Bi[sho]p. for Iacob Blome and Richard Bishop.
