= Seymour Bowman =

English politician (1621–1704)

Seymour Bowman (c. 1621 – 6 May 1704) was an English politician who sat in the House of Commons in 1660.

Bowman was the son of Stephen Bowman of Harnham, Wiltshire. He matriculated at St Mary Hall, Oxford on 19 May 1637 aged 16. He was called to the bar at Lincoln's Inn in 1647.

In 1660, Bowman was elected Member of Parliament for Old Sarum in the Convention Parliament when he was seated after a double return.
