= Edmund Twyneho =

Edmund Twyneho, Twinio or Twyne (by 1518–77), of Watton at Stone, Hertfordshire, was an English Member of Parliament (MP).

He was a Member of the Parliament of England for Lichfield in 1547 and for Old Sarum in April 1554.
