= Casalgrasso =

- Comune
- Comune di Casalgrasso
- Coat of arms

- Location within Italy Location within Piedmont
- Coordinates: 44°49′N 7°38′E
- Country: Italy
- Region: Piedmont
- Province: Cuneo (CN)

Government
  - Mayor: Egidio Vanzetti (Civic list)

Area
  - Total: 17.81 km^{2} (6.88 sq mi)
- Elevation: 240 m (790 ft)

Population (30 November 2017)
  - Total: 1,446
  - Density: 81.19/km^{2} (210.3/sq mi)
- Demonym: Casalgrassesi
- Time zone: UTC+1 (CET)
  - Summer (DST): UTC+2 (CEST)
- Postal code: 12030
- Dialing code: 011
- Website: www.comune.casalgrasso.cn.it

Casalgrasso is a comune (municipality) in the Province of Cuneo in the Italian region Piedmont, located about 30 km (19 mi) south of Turin and about 50 km (31 mi) north of Cuneo.
