= Eliab Harvey (1659–1681) =

English politician

Member of Parliament
- In office 1679–1679
- Constituency: Old Sarum

Personal details
- Born: 1659
- Died: 3 June 1681 (aged 21–22)
- Spouse: Dorothy Dycer (m. 1680)
- Relations: William Harvey (brother)
- Parent: Eliab Harvey

Eliab Harvey (1659 – 3 June 1681) was an English politician who sat as MP for Old Sarum in March 1679.

He was the first son of Sir Eliab Harvey and the brother of William Harvey. On 23 November 1680, he married a 12-year-old heiress, Dorothy, the daughter of Sir Robert Dycer, 2nd Baronet but died on 3 June 1681 and was buried at Hempstead. The ecclesiastical court found the marriage was not consummated, and she married her brother-in-law William three months later.
