= William Hulcote =

English politician

William Hulcote (1513/14 – will proved 1575) was an English politician.

He was a Member (MP) of the Parliament of England for Old Sarum in 1545.
