= John Avery (MP for Old Sarum) =

English politician

John Avery (fl. 1362–1400) was an English politician. He sat as MP for Old Sarum in 1362, 1381, April 1384, November 1384, 1385, February 1388, September 1388, 1394, 1395, and September 1397 and Mayor of Old Sarum in 1400.

He was probably a relative of Bartholomew and John Avery, who both sat as MP for Old Sarum.
