= Francis Windebank (Royalist soldier) =

English Royalist soldier

Francis Windebank (died 1645) supported the Royalist cause during the English Civil War. He was court-martialed and shot for failing to defend Bletchingdon Park, near Oxford.

== Biography ==
Francis was the second son of Sir Francis Windebank, (later Secretary of State to King Charles I). He, was admitted a student of Lincoln's Inn on 19 March 1633. Windebank later entered the service of Thomas Wentworth, 1st Earl of Strafford and was made Usher of the Chamber to Charles, Prince of Wales.

At the outbreak of the Civil War, Windebank supported the Royalist cause, and became a colonel in the Royalist army. He was appointed governor of Bletchingdon Park, near Oxford. Walters speculates that this may have been a dull billet for a young man like Windebank. The house, however, was one of those attacked during Cromwell's raid into Oxfordshire.

The colonel, who according to Yurdan was newly married, allegedly invited his young wife and friends for a ball at the house to raise spirits. Andrews speculates that there may have been a Parliamentarian spy in the camp as it was during this ball that the house came under attack.

Windebank surrendered at the first summons to the parliamentary forces in April 1645, Walters speculates that this was done to protect the lives of his wife and friends even though the Parliamentarian forces had little chance of taking the house by force.

Returning to Oxford he was consequently tried by a Royalist court-martial which took just three hours to sentence him to death by firing squad. According to Walters the execution took place against the length of town wall abutting Merton College, where Windebank bared his chest to the muskets and exclaimed "God Save the King."

He was survived by his wife and a daughter, Frances.

Windebank's ghost was reported to have haunted the site of his execution at Dead Man's Walk, Oxford, in what Walters describes as one of the most well-known Civil War hauntings, which he attributes to the spirit's feeling of injustice at being executed for what he considered a chivalrous action.

The first episode of the 2008 TV mini-series The Devil's Whore contains a fictionalised version of Windebank's story and fate.
