= Nicholas Throckmorton =

English diplomat and politician (c. 1515–1571)

The Honourable Sir Nicholas Throckmorton JP
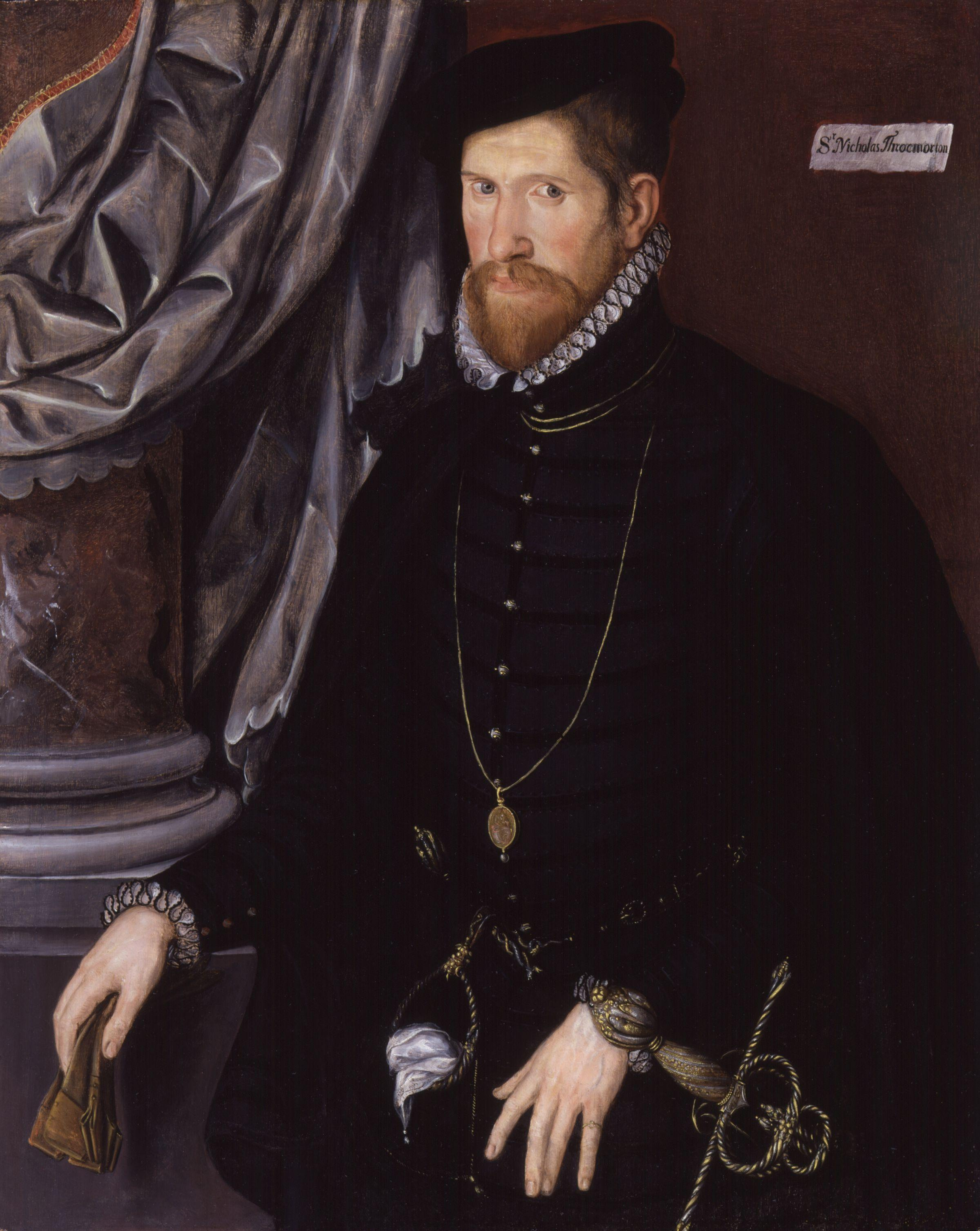
- Sir Nicholas Throckmorton, c. 1562 by Unknown Anglo-Netherlandish artist
- Born: c. 1515–1516
- Died: 12 February 1571 (aged 55–56)
- Resting place: St Katharine Cree, Aldgate ward, City of London; 51.513411°N 0.079133°W
- Occupations: Diplomat; Politician
- Spouse: Anne Carew (m. 1549)
- Children: William Throckmorton; Arthur Throckmorton; Robert Throckmorton; Thomas Throckmorton; Sir Nicholas Throckmorton; Henry Throckmorton; Elizabeth Throckmorton
- Parents: Sir George Throckmorton; Katherine Vaux
- Relatives: Sir John Throckmorton (brother)
- Family: Throckmorton

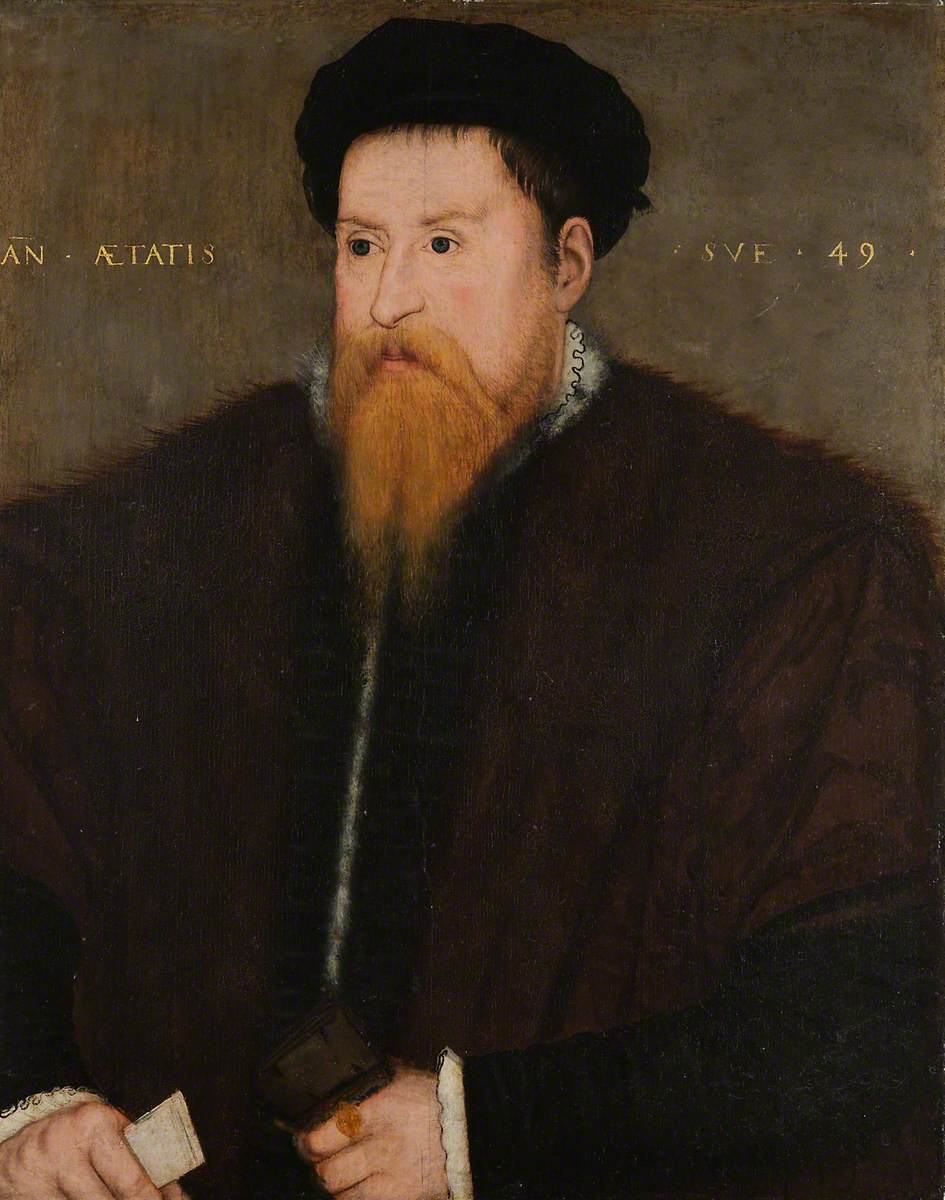
Sir Nicholas Throckmorton (1515–1571) An(no) Aetatis Suae 49 ("in the 49th year of his age", i.e. 1564). English, 16th-century Throckmorton Collection, Coughton Court, Warwickshire, Property of the National Trust, NTPL Ref. No. 153603

Sir Nicholas Throckmorton (or Throgmorton; c. 1515/1516 – 12 February 1571) was an English diplomat and politician, who was an ambassador to France and later Scotland. He played a key role in the relationship between Elizabeth I of England and Mary, Queen of Scots.

== Early years ==
Nicholas Throckmorton was the fourth of eight sons of Sir George Throckmorton of Coughton Court, near Alcester in Warwickshire and Katherine, daughter of Nicholas Vaux, 1st Baron Vaux of Harrowden and Elizabeth FitzHugh, the former Lady Parr. Nicholas was an uncle of the conspirator Francis Throckmorton.

He was a member of the household of Henry FitzRoy, Duke of Richmond and Somerset, and was brought up in the households of members of the Parr family, including that of his cousin Katherine Parr, the last queen consort of Henry VIII. He became acquainted with young Lady Elizabeth when he was serving in the household of the dowager queen and her new husband Thomas Seymour, 1st Baron Seymour of Sudeley and became a close confidant. In his youth, he also became favourable to the Protestant Reformation.

After the execution of Lord Thomas Seymour in 1549 and the downfall of Protector Somerset later in the year, Throckmorton managed to distance himself from those affairs and eventually became part of the circle of John Dudley, 1st Duke of Northumberland and confidant of the young king Edward VI.

He sat in Parliament from 1545 to 1567, initially as the member for Maldon and then from 1547 for Devizes (a seat previously held by his brother Clement Throckmorton). During the reign of Edward VI, he was in high favour with the regents.

In 1547, he was present at the Battle of Pinkie Cleugh during the invasion of Scotland. He was knighted in 1551, and the title included numerous benefits, including land grants, that gave him financial security. He held the post of under-treasurer at the Tower mint from 1549 to 1552. In March 1553, he was elected knight of the shire for Northamptonshire and then MP for Old Sarum (November 1553, which by then was already a rotten borough), Lyme Regis (1559) and Tavistock (1563).

== Tudor successions ==
During the short-lived attempt to place Lady Jane Grey on the throne after the death of Edward VI in 1553, Throckmorton tried to keep contact with supporters of both her and Queen Mary I. Eventually, he began to support the latter.

However, in January 1554, he was suspected of complicity in Wyatt's Rebellion and arrested. Later historians have suspected he was at least involved, either because of his Protestantism or due to his dismay at the growing Spanish influence in the court.

Throckmorton was brought to trial at the Guildhall on 17 April 1554. He managed to convince the jury, which included Simon Lowe alias Fyfield, of his innocence, although the judges were openly hostile to him. They included Sir Roger Cholmeley, who was trying to impress Queen Mary. As a result of the verdict, the court fined and imprisoned the jury and sent Throckmorton to the Tower. When he was released the next year, he fled to exile in France. Though people wanted to put him on trial again, he was pardoned in 1557, and was employed by Queen Mary.

== Elizabeth's court ==
=== Ambassador to France ===
After Elizabeth's accession in November 1558, Throckmorton rose rapidly into favour because of his personal acquaintance with her. He sent her advice on the formation of her government, some of which she followed. Throckmorton acknowledged that Elizabeth had a central and active role in government, and in August 1560 he wrote to Elizabeth that peace between England and Scotland "dothe cheffely depend uppon your majesties order & conducte".

From May 1559 to April 1564, he was ambassador to France. His first assistants were Robert Jones, John Somers, and Henry Middlemore. Throckmorton spoke with the Italian military engineer Giovanni Portinari, ensuring his return to English service. During this time, Throckmorton became acquainted with Mary, Queen of Scots. He described her appearance on 24 May 1559 when she was unwell, in a letter to William Cecil:

Assuredly sir, the Scottishe Quene in mine opinion looketh very ill on it, very pale and green, and the withal short breathed: and it is whispered here amongst them that she cannot long live.

Cecil was pleased with Throckmorton's frequent letter writing. He also asked Throckmorton to find him a French horticulturist to make orchards and vineyards at Burghley, the house he was building near Stamford. Throckmorton conducted negotiations with the English court regarding Mary's travel arrangements when she decided to return to Scotland from France. Though he supported the Reformation, he became her close friend, willing to assist her and do her personal favours. It was said that Throckmorton had worked hard to organise a meeting between the two queens, which never took place. According to rumour, he had been motivated by rewards of "great silver pots and other plate" given to him by Mary, Queen of Scots. Mary had given him a silver cup, which was later owned by his son Arthur Throckmorton.

As an ambassador to France, Throckmorton encouraged Elizabeth to aid the Huguenots, and he surreptitiously took a part in the war of religion. He organised the rescue of the Protestant James Hamilton, 3rd Earl of Arran from France, and his travel in disguise via Switzerland to London. Throckmorton was allowed leave from his duties as ambassador in October 1559 to visit his sick wife in England. Henry Killigrew was left as his deputy. When Throckmorton returned to France in 1560, the Roman Catholic leader François, Duke of Guise imprisoned him as a persona non grata. Guise was convinced that Throckmorton had been involved with the Tumult of Amboise, a Huguenot plot. Throckmorton later remarked that he was afraid he would be killed, but he was released and retained his post as an ambassador.

In February 1561, at Fontainebleau, Throckmorton and the Earl of Bedford conveyed Elizabeth's condolences to Mary, Queen of Scots for the death of Francis II of France, following Mary's period of 40 days of secluded mourning. Her companions there included Henri Cleutin. They had audiences with Catherine de' Medici and Henry of Navarre. In 1562, when religious violence began to intensify in France, Throckmorton wanted to support the mediation efforts of Catherine de' Medici. Later in 1562, when the Huguenot Prince of Condé had taken over Newhaven (modern-day Le Havre) in April, Throckmorton convinced the Queen to send military aid to the Huguenots in what was later called the Newhaven expedition. English troops garrisoned Le Havre in October 1562, but soon fell afoul of the Huguenots and, after the negotiations, the Huguenots turned against the English. After an outbreak of plague, they had to surrender the next year. Catherine de' Medici was suspicious of Throckmorton's schemes, however, and when Elizabeth sent him to negotiate with her in 1563, she placed him under house arrest. Elizabeth sent Sir Thomas Smith to negotiate his release. The two men soon began to dislike each other and in one stage almost came to blows, but Throckmorton was eventually released in 1564. Throckmorton was appointed Chief Butler of England and Chamberlain of the Exchequer in 1564 for life. He continued to send letters and messengers with advice to the Queen and she often took his advice.

=== Envoy to Mary, Queen of Scots ===
After Throckmorton's return to England, the Queen sent him as an ambassador to Scotland in May 1565. His mission was to prevent the marriage of Queen Mary and Darnley. He went to Stirling Castle on 15 May 1565 where ceremonies were being held to grant Darnley and his followers new titles. At first, he was refused entry to the castle, then Mary agreed to speak with him. The wedding went ahead in Edinburgh on 16 July.

After the murder of Darnley, Elizabeth sent Throckmorton to Scotland in June 1567. The Scottish lords had rebelled and captured Mary at Carberry Hill, and Elizabeth wished the lords to restore Mary to her authority. Throckmorton himself had recommended that Elizabeth should support the lords. Mary was held at Lochleven Castle and Throckmorton was not allowed to see her. He was told that Mary was pregnant by Bothwell.

On 25 July 1567, William Maitland of Lethington came to see Throckmorton. As instructed by Elizabeth, Throckmorton asked Lethington if the plan was to restore Mary to the throne. If so, Elizabeth promised to help prosecute Darnley's murder and preserve Prince James. Throckmorton recorded Lethington's personal answer, which outlined that English interference was not welcome at this time, and might even be counterproductive, and Throckmorton would not be allowed to see Mary;

Being in place to knowe more than you can knowe, I saye unto yowe ..., in case you doe on the Quenes majesties behalf your mestris, presse this company to enlarge the Quene my soveraigne, and to suffer you to goe unto her, or doe use any thretnynge speache in those matters, the rather to compasse them (rather than achieve them), I assure you, you wyll put the Quene my soveraigne in greate jeopardye of her lyffe: and therefore there is none other waye for the present to do her good but to give place and use mildness.

Throcknorton's advice, conveyed to Mary at Lochleven, was thought to have influenced her agreement to abdicate on 24 July. Elizabeth repeated her instructions to Throckmorton by letter on 27 July 1567. Elizabeth told Throckmorton he should argue that the lords had deposed Mary against scriptural law, citing Paul's letter to the Romans. Elizabeth noted that as she planned not to send financial aid to the rebel lords, there was a risk they might renew the Auld Alliance with France. Throckmorton was not to give a signal of approval or confirmation to the rebellion by attending the coronation of the infant Prince James as ambassador. Throckmorton sent his junior assistant Henry Middlemore to the coronation instead of going himself.

Throckmorton was working against his own advice and had contradictory orders from both his Queen and Sir William Cecil. The Scottish lords knew him as a friend of Mary and as a supporter of her claim to be a successor to Elizabeth, so he was an unwelcome guest. Some of Elizabeth's messages also offended the lords. Throckmorton was recalled in August after he offended Elizabeth by showing his instructions to the Scottish lords. Before leaving Edinburgh, Moray and the Lords offered him a present of silver plate on behalf of James VI which they had displayed in a cabinet room in Moray's lodging. Throckmorton refused this gift, saying that Mary was their sovereign.

In 1569, Throckmorton was suspected of involvement in the Duke of Norfolk's conspiracy in favour of Mary, and was imprisoned for a time at Windsor. Throckmorton may have erroneously believed Norfolk's idea would suit the wishes of the Queen. He was not put on trial, but did not regain the Queen's confidence afterwards.

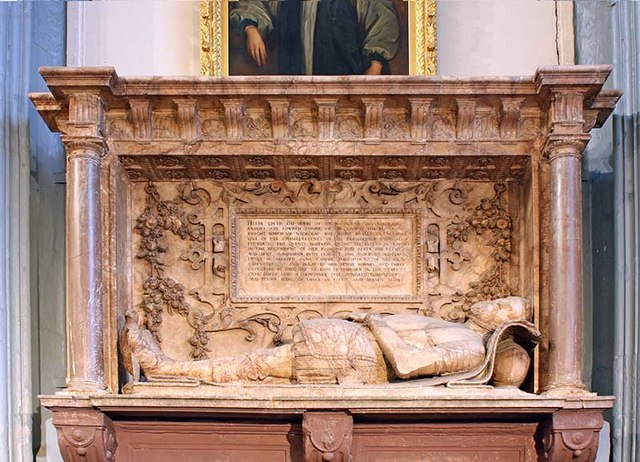
Throckmorton's monument in St. Katharine Cree parish church, London

Throckmorton died on 12 February 1571. He is buried in St. Katharine Cree parish church, Leadenhall Street, London.

== Family and legacy ==
In around 1549 Throckmorton married Anne Carew, daughter of Sir Nicholas Carew, a Knight of the Garter and his wife Elizabeth Bryan, and they had 10 sons, including:

- William Throckmorton.
- Arthur Throckmorton.
- Robert Throckmorton.
- Thomas Throckmorton.
- Sir Nicholas Throckmorton.
- Henry Throckmorton

and three daughters, including Elizabeth, who became the wife of Sir Walter Raleigh. After his death, Anne married Adrian Stokes, the second husband, and former Master of Horse of Frances Grey, Duchess of Suffolk.

Contemporary political figures regarded Throckmorton with respect. One of these was Sir Francis Walsingham who had worked with Throckmorton in France. In 1560 William Cecil said he would be prepared to resign if Throckmorton would take his place and spoke well of him after his death, in spite of their constant disagreements. Some contemporaries also suspected Throckmorton was the éminence grise behind Robert Dudley.

At the time of his death, Throckmorton held the posts of the keeper of Brigstock Park, Northamptonshire; Justice of the Peace in Northamptonshire; and Chief Butler of England and Wales. London's Throgmorton Street is named after him.

== Notes ==
Parliament of England
Preceded by Edward Bury; Henry Dowes	Member of Parliament for Maldon; 1545–1547; With: Clement Smith	Succeeded by Clement Smith; Henry Dowes; William Bassett
Preceded by Clement Throckmorton; Geoffrey Daniell	Member of Parliament for Devizes; 1547–1552; With: George Howard	Succeeded by Unknown
Preceded by Henry Williams; John Cope	Member of Parliament for Northamptonshire; 1553; With: Robert Lane	Succeeded by John Fermor; William Chauncy
Preceded by James Brande; William Wekys	Member of Parliament for Old Sarum; 1553; With: John Throckmorton	Succeeded by Richard Clipper; Edmund Twyneho
Preceded by Jasper Poyntz; John Popham	Member of Parliament for Lyme Regis; 1559; With: John Mallock	Succeeded by Francis Walsingham; William Boteler
Preceded by Unknown	Member of Parliament for Tavistock; 1563–1567; With: Richard Cooke	Succeeded by Nathaniel Bacon; Robert Ferrers
