= Thomas Windebank =

Sir Thomas Windebank, 1st Baronet (born c. 1612) was Member of Parliament (M.P.) for Wootton Bassett and supported the Royalist cause in the English Civil War. He was Clerk of the Signet from 1641 until 1645 and again (after the Interregnum) from 1660 to 1674.

== Biography ==
Thomas Windebank born about 1612, the eldest son of Sir Francis Windebank, (later Secretary of State to King Charles I). He was intended to follow in his father's footsteps into the service of the Crown. He matriculated from St. John's College, Oxford, on 13 November 1629, aged 17, but did not graduate.

In 1631 his father secured for him the reversion of a clerkship of the signet, and soon afterwards, he entered the service of Thomas Howard the Earl Marshal. In 1635–1636 he was travelling in Spain and Italy. By 1640 he was back in England and was M.P. for Wootton Basset in Wiltshire in the Short Parliament. He took up his duties as Clerk of the Signet in 1641.

He supported the Royalist cause in the English Civil War, and was created a baronet on 25 November 1645. He compounded on the Oxford articles. After the Restoration, Windebank was clerk to the signet again from 1660 to 1674.

== Family ==
He was married and left a son Francis, on whose death in 1719 the baronetcy became extinct.

== Notes ==
Parliament of England
Parliament suspended since 1629	Member of Parliament for Wootton Bassett; 1640; With: Edward Hyde	Succeeded by William Pleydell; Edward Poole
Baronetage of England
New creation	Baronet (of Haines Hill); 1612–1645	Succeeded by Francis Windebank
