= John Windebank =

John Windebank (1618–1704) a doctor of medicine who was admitted an honorary fellow of the Royal College of Physicians in 1680 and was buried in Westminster Abbey.

He was the fifth son of Sir Francis Windebank, (later Secretary of State to King Charles I). He was baptised at St. Margaret's, Westminster, on 11 June 1618, and was by William Laud's influence admitted a scholar of Winchester College in 1630. He matriculated from New College, Oxford, on 23 September 1634, graduated B.A. on 5 April 1638 and M.A. on 22 January 1642. He was fellow from 1636 to 1643, when apparently he went abroad.

Windebank compounded on 9 August 1649 for being a Royalist, being fined only 10s., and was created M.D. on 21 June 1654 on Oliver Cromwell's letters as chancellor. In these letters it was stated that he had spent some time in foreign parts in the study of physic, and had practised for some years with much credit and reputation.

He practised at Guildford, and was admitted honorary fellow of the Royal College of Physicians on 30 September 1680. He was buried in Westminster Abbey on 16 August 1704.
