= John Giles (MP fl. 1417–1435) =

English politician

John Giles (fl. 1417–1435) was an English politician and attorney.

His wife was named Alice. He had two sons, including MP Robert Giles.

He was a Member (MP) of the Parliament of England for Old Sarum in 1417, Marlborough in December 1421, Calne in 1422 and 1423, Wilton in 1425, and Devizes in 1431, 1432 and 1435.
