= Clerk of the Signet =

Civil service position in the United Kingdom

The Clerks of the Signet were English officials who played an intermediate role in the passage of letters patent through the seals. For most of the history of the position, four clerks were in office simultaneously.

Letters patent prepared by the Clerk of the Patents were engrossed at the Patent Office and then sent by the Secretary of State to receive the royal sign-manual. The duty of the Clerks of the Signet was to compare the signed bills with a transcript prepared by the Clerk of the Patents, and then to rewrite the transcript as a bill of privy signet, which was returned to the Secretary of State to be signed with that instrument.

By the end of the seventeenth centuries, many of the Clerks of the Signet performed their work through deputies, with the office itself becoming a sinecure. The Treasury was given the authority to reduce the number of clerkships in 1832, abolishing one in 1833 and another in 1846. The two remaining posts were done away with in 1851.

== List of Clerks of the Signet ==
- John Depeden c.1420
- Thomas Andrew c.1422
- William Crosby 1437–1459
- George Ashby c.1440
- Robert Osbern c.1440
- Nicholas Harpesfield c.1445
- Edmund Blake c.1450
- John Bowden 1452–1459
- Richard Bell 1463–1474
- William Robyns c.1470–c.1482
- Oliver King c.1473
- John Wylde c.1475–c.1488
- Edmund Gregory c.1479–c.1483

The history of these earlier Signets in the medieval period is not recorded by the table below.

Early Modern to Later Modern Clerks of the Signet
Date	One	Two	Three	Four
1509	Brian Tuke			
1523	Thomas Derbey	Unknown	Unknown	Unknown
1530	Thomas Derbey	Thomas Wriothesley	Unknown	Unknown
1532	Thomas Derbey	Thomas Wriothesley	William Paget	Unknown
bef. 1537	Thomas Derbey	Thomas Wriothesley	William Paget	John Godsalve
2 October 1539	John Huttoft	Thomas Wriothesley	William Paget	John Godsalve
14 April 1540	John Huttoft	Thomas Knight	William Paget	John Godsalve
1541	Richard Taverner	Thomas Knight	William Paget	John Godsalve
bef. 1544	Richard Taverner	Thomas Knight	William Honing	John Godsalve
bef. 1545	Richard Taverner	William or Gregory Railton.	William Honing	John Godsalve
1547/55	Nicasius Yetsweirt	William or Gregory Railton.	William Honing	John Cliffe
30 October 1561	Nicasius Yetsweirt	John Somer	William Honing	John Cliffe
December 1569	Nicasius Yetsweirt	John Somer	Sir Thomas Windebank	John Cliffe
1578/89	Sir John Wood	Charles Yetsweirt	Sir Thomas Windebank	John Cliffe
9 March 1589	Sir John Wood	Charles Yetsweirt	Sir Thomas Windebank	Sir Thomas Lake
23 December 1595	Sir John Wood	Nicholas Faunt	Sir Thomas Windebank	Sir Thomas Lake
24 October 1607	Sir John Wood	Nicholas Faunt	Levinus Munck	Sir Thomas Lake
1608	Sir John Wood	Francis Gall	Levinus Munck	Sir Thomas Lake
5 September 1610	Francis Windebank	Francis Gall	Levinus Munck	Sir Thomas Lake
13 January 1616	Francis Windebank	Francis Gall	Levinus Munck	Robert Kirkham
27 May 1623	Francis Windebank	Francis Gall	Sir Humphrey May	Robert Kirkham
9 June 1630	Francis Windebank	Francis Gall	John More	Robert Kirkham
15 June 1632	Sir Abraham Williams	Francis Gall	John More	Robert Kirkham
1638	Sir Abraham Williams	Francis Gall	Edward Norgate	Philip Warwick
1641/5	Sir Abraham Williams	Sir Thomas Windebanke, 1st Baronet	Edward Norgate	Philip Warwick

Appointments were not made under the Commonwealth of England until 1655 as the republic did not recognise hereditary house of Lords, so peerages were not created.

- 1655–1705:John Nicholas
- 16 June 1655: James Nutley
- 20 March 1656: Samuel Morland

Appointments resumed upon the Restoration in 1660, including two of the former officeholders, Warwick and Windebanke.

Date	One	Two	Three	Four
1660	Sir Philip Warwick	Sir Thomas Windebanke, 1st Baronet	William Trumbull	Sir John Nicholas
bet. 1674–1678	Sir Philip Warwick	Sidney Bere	William Trumbull	Sir John Nicholas
1678	Sir Philip Warwick	Sidney Bere	Nicholas Morice	Sir John Nicholas
15 January 1683	Sir William Trumbull	Sidney Bere	Nicholas Morice	Sir John Nicholas
1684	Sir William Trumbull	John Gauntlett	Nicholas Morice	Sir John Nicholas
9 February 1705	Sir William Trumbull	John Gauntlett	Nicholas Morice	William Cooke
25 August 1708	Sir William Trumbull	John Gauntlett	Joseph Moyle	William Cooke
18 February 1716	Peter Alexander	John Gauntlett	Joseph Moyle	William Cooke
2 October 1716	Peter Alexander	Gauntlet Fry	Joseph Moyle	William Cooke
28 May 1728	Peter Alexander	Gauntlet Fry	Joseph Moyle	Charles Delafaye; Thomas Delafaye
13 November 1729	Edward Weston	Gauntlet Fry	Joseph Moyle	Charles Delafaye; Thomas Delafaye
7 May 1736	Edward Weston	Gauntlet Fry	Sir Joseph Copley, 1st Baronet	Charles Delafaye; Thomas Delafaye
22 May 1746	Edward Weston	William Blair	Sir Joseph Copley, 1st Baronet	Charles Delafaye; Thomas Delafaye
1747	Edward Weston	William Blair	Sir Joseph Copley, 1st Baronet	Charles Delafaye
22 December 1762	Edward Weston	William Blair	Sir Joseph Copley, 1st Baronet	James Rivers
15 July 1770	Montagu Wilkinson	William Blair	Sir Joseph Copley, 1st Baronet	James Rivers
16 April 1781	Montagu Wilkinson	William Blair	John Tirel Morin	James Rivers
4 March 1782	Montagu Wilkinson	William Fraser	John Tirel Morin	James Rivers
June 1797	Eardley Wilmot	William Fraser	John Tirel Morin	James Rivers
24 January 1801	Sir Brook Taylor	William Fraser	John Tirel Morin	James Rivers
11 December 1802	Sir Brook Taylor	William Harry Edward Bentinck	John Tirel Morin	James Rivers
19 March 1807	Sir Brook Taylor	William Harry Edward Bentinck	John Gage	James Rivers
30 October 1807	Sir Brook Taylor	William Harry Edward Bentinck	John Gage	Thomas Norton Powlett
26 February 1825	Sir Brook Taylor	William Harry Edward Bentinck	John Gage	Alexander Cockburn
8 May 1826	Sir Brook Taylor	William Harry Edward Bentinck	John Gage	Augustus Granville Stapleton
1831	Sir Brook Taylor	William Harry Edward Bentinck	John Gage	abolished
15 October 1846	abolished	William Harry Edward Bentinck	John Gage	abolished
26 January 1847	abolished	William Harry Edward Bentinck	Charles Samuel Grey	abolished
7 August 1851	abolished	Office abolished		abolished
