= Thomas Hilton (by 1508 – 1558 or later) =

English politician

Thomas Hilton (by 1508 – 1558 or later) was an English politician.

He was a member (MP) of the parliament of England for Old Sarum in 1529.

Hilton was appointed High Sheriff of Durham for 1532–33 and 1533–34, and High Sheriff of Northumberland for 1543–44.
