= William Lambert (MP) =

16th-century English politician

William Lambert (fl. 1529) was an English politician.

He was a Member (MP) of the Parliament of England for Old Sarum in 1529.
