= Christopher Windebank =

English interpreter

Christopher Windebank (born 1615), was an English translator who lived in Madrid and worked as guide and interpreter for English ambassadors.

== Biography ==
Christopher who was born in 1615 was a son of Sir Francis Windebank, (later Secretary of State to King Charles I). He was a demy of Magdalen College, Oxford, from 1630 to 1635.

He was then sent to Madrid "to understand that court", and lived for a time with the English ambassador, Sir Arthur Hopton. In 1638 he made an imprudent marriage, which cost him his post, and on 5 August 1639 Hopton suggested that his wife should be placed in a convent. Subsequently, being "a perfect Spaniard and an honest man", he was found useful as a guide and interpreter by English ambassadors at Madrid.
