= Eliab Harvey (1635–1699) =

English politician

Member of Parliament
- Constituency: Old Sarum Essex Maldon

Personal details
- Born: 1635
- Died: 20 February 1699 (aged 63–64)
- Spouse: Dorothy Whitmore (m. 1658)
- Children: William Harvey; Eliab Harvey
- Education: University of Padua

Sir Eliab Harvey (1635 – 20 February 1699) was an English politician. He was knighted on 27 May 1660.

== Early life and education ==
He was baptised on 3 June 1635. He was the first son of Eliab Harvey, a grocer and merchant and Mary (nee West). He was educated at Merchant Taylors’ School (from 1643) and later studied at the University of Padua in 1656.

== Parliamentary career ==
He entered Parliament as MP for Old Sarum in 1669. He sat as MP for Essex in March 1679 and Old Sarum in October 1679, 1681, and 1685. He sat as MP for Maldon on 7 December 1693, 1695 and 1698 – 20 February 1699.

== Issue ==
On 7 December 1658, he married Dorothy, the daughter of Sir Thomas Whitmore, 1st Baronet and had three sons and four daughters. Two of his sons, William and Eliab became MPs and two of his sons predeceased him.
