= Henry Middlemore =

English courtier and diplomat

Henry Middlemore (d. 1592) was an English courtier and diplomat.

== Career ==
He was a younger son of Henry Middlemore of Hawkesley (d. 1549) and Margery Gatacre.

His home was at Enfield in Middlesex. He leased the manor from the crown from 1582, including a house later known as Enfield Palace.

He was a secretary and steward to the ambassador in France, Nicholas Throckmorton, in 1559 and 1560, who described him as a cousin. Throckmorton wrote that he was "an honest and faithful young man". Middlemore's grandmother Eleanor was a daughter of Thomas Throckmorton of Coughton Court. Middlemore kept Lord Robert Dudley informed of events at the French court.

=== Missions to Scotland ===
Throckmorton and Middlemore arrived at Stirling Castle in the morning of 15 May 1565. Middlemore went to announce their arrival at the castle gate. After some delay, Throckmorton had an audience in the castle with Mary and discussed Elizabeth I's opinion of her plans to marry Lord Darnley.

In July 1567, Middlemore went to Scotland to see Throckmorton in Edinburgh. He went to Stirling and attended the coronation of James VI. He gave a report of the event to Throckmorton, who sent it to Queen Elizabeth:

my cowsen Henrye Myddlemore retorned from Sterlynge to thys Towne, by whom I understand thynges have passed at Sterlynge as ensueth: The 29th day of July ... the yonge Prince was crowned in the great Churche of Sterlyng by the Bisshop of Orkneye ... Mr Knox preached and tooke a place of the Scrypture forthe of the bookes of the Kynges where Joas was crowned verye yonge to treate on. Some ceremonyes accustomablye used at the Coronation of their Princes were omytted, and many retayned. Th'oath usually to be mynistered to the Kynge this realme at his coronation was taken by the Earl of Morton and the Laird of Dun on the Prynces behalfe".

=== Mary, Queen of Scots, at Carlisle Castle ===
In 1568 he was given a delicate mission mediating between the exiled Mary, Queen of Scots and her half-brother, the Regent Moray. He went to Carlisle and spoke to Mary on 13 June. Middlemore noted her "great passion and weeping, complaining of her evil usage and contrarious handling to her expectation". Mary realised her chances of meeting Queen Elizabeth were fading, and she said to him:

Alas, it is a small piece of comfort to me (nay rather it is a hurt to me) to be removed hence and not to be brought to the Queen my good sister; but now I am in her hands, and so she may dispose of me as she will.

He then rode into Dumfries in Scotland and met Regent Moray at Kenmure Castle on 16 June. He was instructed to tell Moray that Queen Elizabeth wished he would cease hostility against Mary's remaining followers, and end his campaign of slighting their castles. Kenmure belonged to Mary's supporter the Laird of Lochinvar, and Moray's soldiers were demolishing it. He also spoke to William Maitland at Hoddom Castle. Mary heard about the continued demolitions before Middlemore returned to see her at Carlisle, and "fell into great passion". He spoke to Mary again at Carlisle Castle on 28 June.

Middlemore came back from Scotland with Moray's statement that he had obtained the casket letters, which demonstrated that Mary was guilty of the murder of her husband Lord Darnley and not fit to rule. Moray hoped that Middlemore would tell Queen Elizabeth that his offers of peaceable settlement to Mary's followers in the West of Scotland had been "despitefully rejected".

Middlemore seems to visited Mary again in February 1580 when her keeper, the Earl of Shrewsbury, was unwell.

Mary, Queen of Scots, never forgot Middlemore's role in the events of 1568. She mentioned in April 1583 to the Earl of Shrewsbury and Robert Beale how she had instructed her allies in Scotland not to fight her enemies when the opportunity was theirs and so lost her advantage. Mary also relied on what Middlemore had said to her in 1568 as a guarantee of Elizabeth's hospitality to her and her safety in England. In September 1586, Robert Beale wrote to Francis Walsingham's about Mary's reliance on Middlemore's 1568 message from Elizabeth, and Beale thought there was no licence of impunity if Mary troubled Elizabeth's estate.

=== Later life ===
Middlemore was a groom of the privy chamber to Queen Elizabeth, in place of John Tamworth (who had also been a diplomat in Scotland).

Henry Middlemore died in 1592.

His publications include, The Translation of a letter written by a Frenche Gentilwoman to an other ... by Henry Myddlemore Gentylman at the request of the Ladye Anne Throkmorton (Humfrye Toye, London, 1564).

== Marriage and children ==
He married Elizabeth Fowkes (d. 1633), daughter of Robert Fowkes of Symondsbury. Their children included:

- Robert Middlemore, an equerry at court, who married Dorothy Foulstow (1579-1610) in 1601.
- Elizabeth Middlemore (d. 1610), said to have married Edward Zouch of Woking or Edward Zouche of Bramshill in 1608. A "Lady Souch". wife of "Sir Edward Souch" was buried at St Peter's Westminster on 5 March 1609/10. Edward Zouch of Woking had married Eleanor Brittayne in 1598, and in 1612 he married Dorothea Silking, a lady in waiting to Anne of Denmark.
- Mary Middlemore, maiden of honour in the household of Anne of Denmark, and muse to the poet William Fowler.

After his death his widow married Vincent Skinner and joined the household of Anne of Denmark.
