= Francis Windebank =

English politician (1582–1646)

Sir Francis Windebank
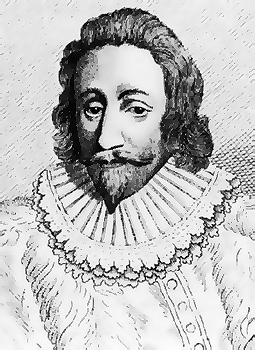
- Born: 1582
- Died: 1646 (aged 63–64); Paris, France
- Education: St John's College, Oxford
- Children: Thomas Windebank; Francis Windebank; Christopher Windebank; John Windebank
- Parents: Sir Thomas Windebank (father); Frances Dymoke (mother)

Sir Francis Windebank (1582 – 1 September 1646) was an English politician who was Secretary of State under Charles I.

== Biography ==
Francis was the only son of Sir Thomas Windebank of Hougham, Lincolnshire, who owed his advancement to the Cecil family, Francis entered St John's College, Oxford, in 1599, coming there under the influence of the Archbishop of Canterbury, William Laud. After a few years of continental travel (1605–1608), he settled at Haines Hill at Hurst in Berkshire and was employed for many years in minor public offices, eventually becoming clerk of the council.

In June 1632, he was appointed by King Charles I as Secretary of State in succession to Lord Dorchester, his senior colleague being Sir John Coke, and he was knighted. His appointment was mainly due to his Spanish and Roman Catholic sympathies. The first Earl of Portland, Francis, Lord Cottington, and Windebank formed an inner group in the council, and with their aid the king carried on various secret negotiations, especially with Spain.

In December 1634 Windebank was appointed to discuss with the papal agent Gregorio Panzani the possibility of a union between the Anglican and Roman Churches, and expressed the opinion that the Puritan opposition might be crippled by sending their leaders to the war in the Netherlands.

Windebank's efforts as treasury commissioner in 1635 to shield some of those guilty of corruption led to a breach with Archbishop Laud. In the same year Windebank was one of the promoters of the Courteen association, and the next year he was for a time disgraced for issuing an order for the conveyance of Spanish money to pay the Spanish troops in the Netherlands.

In July 1638 he urged the king to make war with the Scots, and in 1640, when trouble was breaking out in England, he sent an appeal from Queen Henrietta Maria to the pope for money and men. He was elected in March 1640 to the Short Parliament, as member for Oxford University, and he entered the Long Parliament in October as member for Corfe Castle. In December the House learnt that he had signed letters of grace to recusant priests and Jesuits, and summoned him to answer the charge, but the king allowed him to escape to France. From Calais, he wrote to Christopher Hatton, defending his integrity, and affirming his belief that the Church of England was the purest and nearest the primitive Church. He remained in Paris until his death, shortly after he had been received into the Roman communion.

== Family ==
Windebank married and had a large family. William Laud referred in 1630 to his "many sons". He had five at least, and four survived him:

1. Thomas (born c. 1612), was M.P. for Wootton Bassett and supported the Royalist cause in the English Civil War. He was made a baronet in 1645. He was Clerk of the Signet from 1641 until 1645 and again (after the Interregnum) from 1660 to 1674.
2. Francis (died 1645), supported the Royalist cause during the English Civil War. He was court-martialled and shot for failing to defend Bletchingdon House, near Oxford.
3. Christopher (born 1615), was an Englishman who lived in Madrid and worked as guide and interpreter for English ambassadors.
4. —
5. John (1618–1704), a physician who was admitted an honorary fellow of the Royal College of Physicians in 1680 and was buried in Westminster Abbey.

Of Windebank's daughters:

- Margaret married Thomas Turner (1591–1672), and was mother of Thomas Turner (1645–1714), president of Corpus Christi College, Oxford, and of Francis Turner, bishop of Ely, one of the seven Bishops who, refusing to accept James II's Declaration of Indulgence, were imprisoned in the Tower of London.
- Frances married Sir Edward Hales on 12 July 1669.
- One other died unmarried at Paris about 1650.
- Two others became nuns of the Calvary at the Église Sainte-Marie-des-Anges, Paris.

== Notes ==
Political offices
Preceded by Viscount Dorchester; Sir John Coke	Secretary of State; 1632–1640 with Sir John Coke then Sir Henry Vane in 1640	Succeeded by Sir Henry Vane (sole holder)
