= Michel de Sèvre =

French diplomat

Michel de Sèvre or de Seurre (active 1539–1593) was a member of the Knights Hospitaller, a French courtier and diplomat, and Grand Master of the Order of Saint Lazarus from 1564 to 1578 and from 1586 to 1593.

== Early life ==
Michel de Sèvre was born in Lumigny-en-Brie, the son of Antoine de Sèvre, lord of Ville-du-Bois in the parish of Lumigny, and of Louise de Verdelot, daughter of Georges de Verdelot, lord of Prèz, and Catherine de Sailly, lady of Mersan.

On 11 June 1539 he entered the Knights Hospitaller in the Grand Priory of France.

== Career ==
De Sèvre and Nicolas de Villegagnon commanded the fleet that brought Mary, Queen of Scots from Dumbarton Castle to France in July 1548.

In 1560, de Sèvre was Ordinary Gentleman of the King's Chamber, King's Chamberlain, Counselor in his Privy Council and captain of fifty men-at-arms. In March, he was sent to the court of Queen Elizabeth I of England as ambassador of King Francis II of France. He wrote to Mary of Guise in Scotland about the friction caused by the controversial use of the heraldry of England by Mary, Queen of Scots, and Francis II.

In Scotland, the Reformation crisis led to the siege of Leith. De Sèvre made complaints about the activity of William Wynter against French shipping. He wrote of attacks on three ships of Mary of Guise, one carrying artillery to st Andrews, and two smaller boats guarding the Forth captained by Frenchmen. Wynter's Lyon had captured a Breton ship, the Marie Babuilduc which had carried a cargo of grain belonging to the King of France. In March 1560, De Sèvre wrote to the French diplomats Jacques de La Brosse, Henri Cleutin, and Nicolas de Pellevé, describing Elizabeth's pretence that Wynter would be punished. He hoped they could help resolve the escalating conflict in Scotland.

James Hamilton, Duke of Châtellerault, a Protestant leader in Scotland, heard that de Sèvre had told Elizabeth I that the Scottish Protestants had abandoned their cause and sought a pardon from Mary of Guise. Hamilton said any of a hundred men of his surname would fight a duel with him and prove him a liar.

De Sèvre was involved in the negotiations for the withdrawal of French and English forces from Scotland. He continued in office as ambassador until 1562, when he was recalled by King Charles IX of France.

In 1564 he was appointed Grand Master of the Order of Saint Lazarus, serving in that capacity until 1578, and then again from 1586 to 1593.

Seigneur de Sèvre was known for his cynical and caustic wit. In 1584 he was physically assaulted in the council chamber by King Henry III of France, for a perceived insult.

== Bibliography ==
- David Potter, A Knight of Malta at the Court of Elizabeth I: The Correspondence of Michel de Seure, French Ambassador, 1560-1561. Camden Fifth Series, v. 45. Cambridge: Cambridge University Press for the Royal Historical Society, 2014.
