= Gabriel Pleydell =

English politician (16th century)

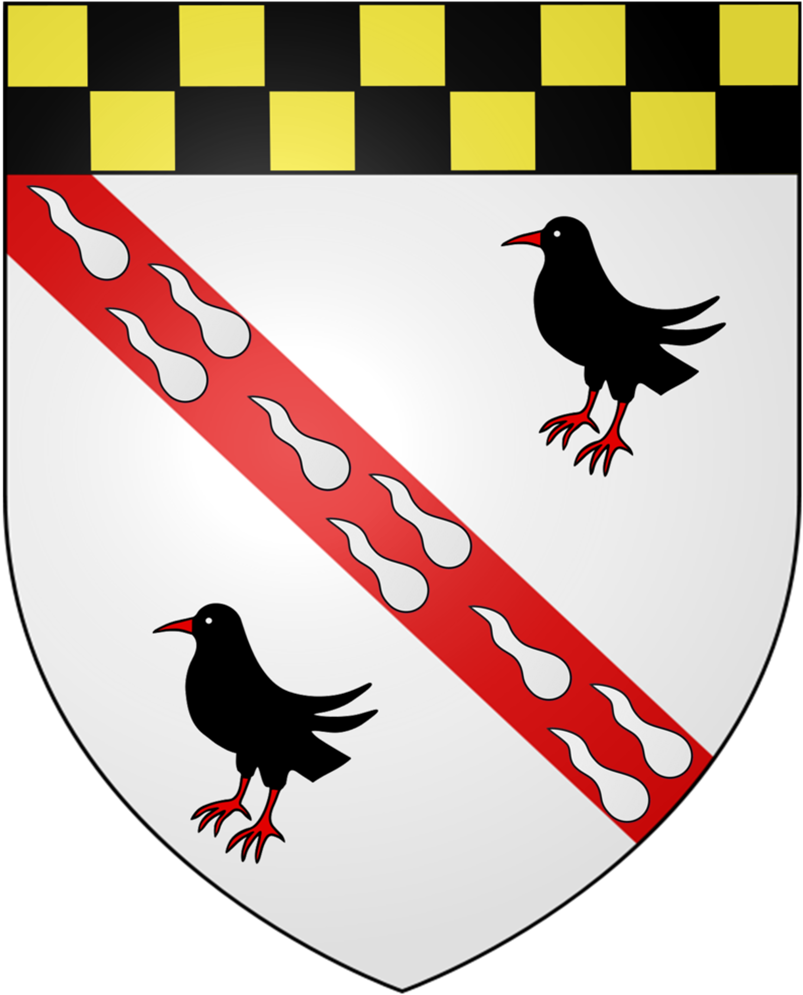
Coat of arms of the Pleydell family of Lydiard Tregoze, Wiltshire (Note: Escutcheon: "Argent a bend gules guttée d'eau, between two Cornish choughs proper a chief chequy or and sable".)

Gabriel Pleydell (fl. 1519 – c.1591) of Midg Hall in the parish of Lydiard St John (later Lydiard Tregoze) in Wiltshire, was an English landowner and politician who served as Member of Parliament for the Wootton Bassett and Marlborough constituencies in the Parliament of England. Pleydell was born before 1519 into a large, affluent family. He entered politics in March 1553 as a member for Wootton Bassett, close to his family estate at Midgehall in Wiltshire. Pleydell's election to the Marlborough constituency two years later may have been made possible by his father's influential connections. He returned to the Wootton Bassett seat at the request of Sir John Thynne in 1563; he had supported Thynne in a dispute over the Knighthood of the Shire in 1559.

Pleydell's political and personal life is marked by legal controversy. Almost always a defendant in court, known allegations include the forced expulsion of residents from a country manor, forcible entry into and seizure of goods from a private property, unlawfully protecting convicts from justice, forging documents for his own benefit, and illegal hunting. He was alleged to be one of the ringleaders of a plot to exile Queen Mary I, and is perhaps best known for his contentious claim of parliamentary privilege after he was found guilty of this offence in 1555, an action which caused serious disagreement between the House of Commons and the House of Lords. Legal accusations for most of his political career and imprisonment in Fleet Prison and the Tower of London helped "confirm for Gabriel Pleydell a niche in parliamentary history", according to a modern historian. He died between 19 December 1590 and 3 February 1591.

== Early life and family ==
Pleydell was born by 1519. The sixth of nine children, he was the fourth son of wealthy tenant farmer William Pleydell of Coleshill, Berkshire—now Oxfordshire—and Agnes Reason (daughter of Robert Reason of Corfe Castle, Dorset). (Note: While Burke lists Agnes' father as Robert, Bindoff and Hasler have speculated that his forename may have been John.) His younger brother was John Pleydell, Member for Cricklade in 1593. The Pleydell family were thought to descend from Thomas de Coleshill, a knight who was awarded lordship of the eponymous parish on 2 March 1275 by King Edward I. Gabriel came of age by 1540, holding land once owned by Sir Anthony Hungerford at Eysey (near the parish of Cricklade).

Pleydell's father, William, had been given a 95-year lease of the Midgehall estate in Lydiard Tregoze by the Abbot of Stanley Abbey in 1534. (Note: The Abbey had leased the estate from 1324, having owned it from the mid-12th century. Midgehall passed to the possession of Edward Seymour after the Dissolution of the Monasteries led to the dismantling of the Abbey in 1536. Pleydell's father continued to fulfill his tenancy under Seymour despite this change in ownership.) A 1545 record, ordering Gabriel to pay 26 shillings and 8 pence in benevolence (Note: A 'benevolence' was an unofficial, forced tax introduced by Thomas Wolsey for wealthy landowners and the clergy; historically, it is otherwise known as the 'Amicable Grant'.) to the crown under King Henry VIII, indicates that he was soon managing Midgehall's financial affairs. His father entrusted him in 1549 with tenancy of the manor house at West Ilsley, Berkshire and in September 1553 a sublease of the Midgehall estate. William died in 1555, leaving Midgehall's full lease to his wife, Agnes. When she died in 1567, Gabriel unsuccessfully challenged his mother's will (an action which estranged his younger brother, John) despite inheriting tenancy of the estate. Pleydell's father originally intended two of his elder sons—Virgil and Tobias—to succeed ownership before Gabriel. Virgil died around 1559 and by 1567 Tobias had been resident in Chipping Faringdon for 11 years, prompting him to relinquish his inheritance.

== Marriage and children ==
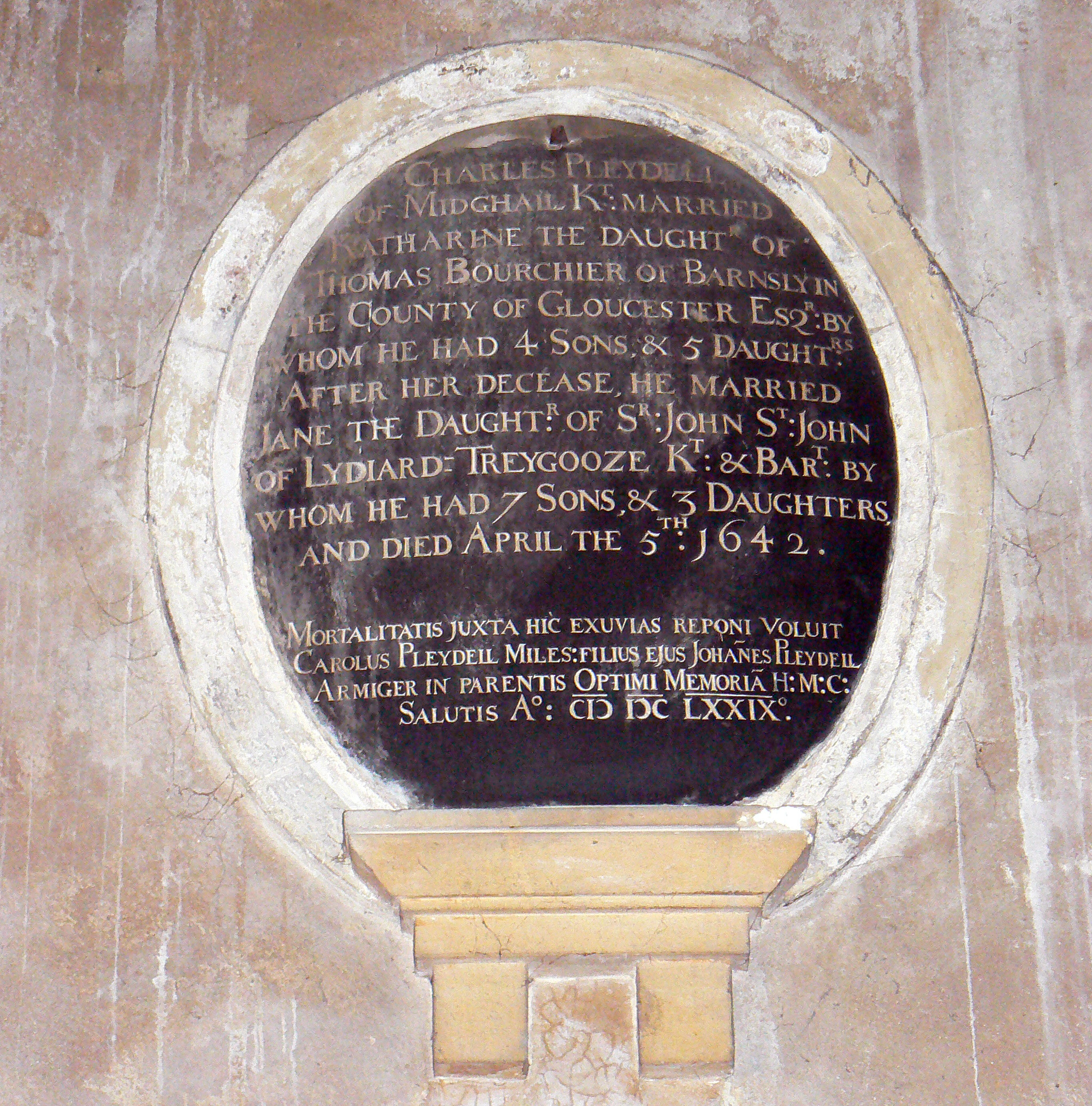
Mural monument to Sir Charles Pleydell, Gabriel's grandson, in St Mary's Church, Lydiard Tregoze

He married Anne Stockes, a daughter of Henry Stockes of Sussex, (Note: Burke writes 'Stockes' as the surname's proper spelling; whereas Bindoff suggests 'Stocks' (pronounced 'Stokes').) by whom he had two surviving children:

- Oliver Pleydell, who married firstly a daughter of a certain "Palmer Esq." from Gloucestershire, by whom he had one son: Sir Charles Pleydell, who married Katharine Bouchier, a daughter of Thomas Bouchier of Barnsley, Gloucestershire, by whom he had nine children, including John Pleydell and William Pleydell. Oliver Pleydell married secondly to Jane St. John, a daughter of Sir John St. John, four-times a Member of Parliament for Bedfordshire, by whom he had a further ten children;
- Agnes Pleydell, the wife of William Bayly a barrister and a Member of Parliament for Chippenham from 1572 until 1583 and Undersheriff of Wiltshire from 1579 to 1580, (Note: Periodic parliamentary and tax records give the name 'Bayly' or 'Bayley'; Hasler considers 'Bayliffe' to be an acceptable alternative.) whom she bore seven children, including Henry Bayly a Member of Parliament for Malmesbury in 1586 and 1589, and John Bayly a Member of Parliament for Chippenham from 1621 to 1622.

=== Other descendants ===
Gabriel is the principal ancestor of the Pleydells of Milborne St Andrew, later removed to Whatcombe, both in Dorset. Contained within this lineage was Edmund Morton Pleydell, a Member of Parliament for Dorchester from 1722 to 1723 and for Dorset from 1727 until 1747. His own father, Edmund Pleydell, similarly served as a Member of Parliament for Wootton Bassett from December 1710 until 1715.

== Parliamentary career ==
Victorian depiction of the 16th-century Palace of Westminster, where Parliament met

Pleydell's initial entrance to the Parliament of England in March 1553 as a member for the market town of Wootton Bassett was, at least in part, made possible by his status as a wealthy landholder. Although he had not yet inherited the lease on the family estate of Midgehall, his purchases of land and property surrounding the manor (one mile from the constituency) (Note: Bindoff and Hasler disagree on the proximity of the Midgehall estate to the town of Wootton Bassett; the former placing it one mile north, the latter, one mile south. A map from 1773 places Midgehall to the east of the settlement.) in 1561 and 1562 suggest that his assets facilitated a seat in the House of Commons. The constituency was eventually abolished by the Reform Act 1832. (Note: Established in 1447, Wootton Bassett has been described "as a classic example of a 'rotten borough'": a seat in which a minute electorate appointed a member of parliament, perhaps swayed by personal interests or bribery.) Surviving records note Pleydell's returning to Parliament solely by his Christian name, deemed sufficiently unusual to identify him outright. Succeeding members John Seymour and Robert Huick from the 1547–52 session, (Note: In the House of Commons of England, each enfranchised borough constituency typically elected two members or "burgesses". This also applied to its successor, the House of Commons of Great Britain. Multi-member constituencies were abolished for the House of Commons of the United Kingdom with the passing of the Representation of the People Act 1948.) Pleydell served with William Garrard for just 30 days in March until a dissolution of Parliament. They were replaced in October by Henry Poole and John Throckmorton.

His 1555 election for Marlborough was similar, but more dependent on influential connections. Pleydell's father had once leased the lands of Thomas Seymour in the nearby parish of Eastrop (and possibly Preshute), establishing a relationship of trust between the families. After Seymour's brother Edward was executed in 1552, his widow Anne inherited the responsibility of maintaining the vast estates. The Duchess appointed Pleydell as chief ranger of Savernake Forest (then under her ownership) before 1554 and as her receiver general that year. His position as ranger probably led to the acquisition of property in Chippenham and Preshute, and his status as a Preshute landholder assisted him in becoming Member for Marlborough. (Note: Before the passing of the 1832 Reform Act, many members represented "pocket boroughs". These contained burgage tenements, the holders of which were given suffrage. Wealthy landowners who were seeking election for themselves or an associate would purchase said tenements and convey them for the duration of an election to a reliable nominee, who could then vote for the candidate. Thus by purchasing the majority of the burgages one could acquire the right to nominate the members of parliament.) Pleydell, serving with Sir Andrew Baynton, replaced Peter Taylor alias Perce and John Broke of the 1554 session; they were succeeded by William Daniell and William Fleetwood in 1558 after a parliamentary hiatus following the death of Queen Mary I.

Pleydell returned as a Member for Wootton Bassett in 1563. His appointment was made possible by the patronage of former Member for Marlborough Sir John Thynne, an eminent figure in Wiltshire politics who was the county's custos rotulorum for at least 20 years. Pleydell had supported Thynne in a contest over the Knighthood of the Shire in 1559, which doubtless assisted his bid for parliamentary selection. Wootton Bassett's other seat was occupied by Matthew Poyntz, with whom Pleydell served until 1567. (Note: John Hippisley was originally elected to Poyntz's seat in 1562, before the Parliament had actually assembled. He instead sat for Wells after a writ was ordered.) Replacing Christopher Dysmars and Humphrey Moseley from the 1559 session, they were succeeded in 1571 by Henry Knyvet and John Winchcombe.

== Legal affairs ==
=== Plaintiff and early defendant ===
Pleydell's parliamentary tenure was plagued by legal controversy. Usually a defendant in the courts, he was the plaintiff in at least three cases. Toward the end of the reign of King Edward VI, he brought a charge in the Star Chamber against several men who forced his expulsion from the manor house at Withington, Gloucestershire that he was leasing. The second was a case brought to the Court of Chancery between 1558 and 1579, with Gabriel accusing his brother Tobias (known in the court documents as "Toby") in a dispute over the Midgehall estate. The same Court also heard a dispute initiated by Pleydell against Sir John St. John, his son's father-in-law, at an unknown date; Gabriel claimed that Midgehall had certain pasture rights in the Flaxlands area, then under St. John's ownership.

The first serious allegation against Pleydell in the Star Chamber concerned the forced expulsion of an occupant of the manor house at East Grafton, Wiltshire, in late 1553. He was accused of assisting John Berwick in the original infringement and composing an amenable jury in Marlborough to avoid conviction. Both were found innocent of breaching the peace and claimed to have acted at the reasonable request of their employer, Anne Seymour; undue interference with judicial proceedings was ruled out. Around the same time, Pleydell was sued for forcible entry and illegal seizure of property at Little Bedwyn (with similar offences at Collingbourne Ducis) but claimed to be acting on the failure of the plaintiff to punctually pay rent.

=== Involvement in the Dudley conspiracy ===
Pleydell was a Protestant, and he is described by P. W. Hasler as "a religious and political radical" under Queen Mary, and voted against a government bill in 1555 while he was a Member for Marlborough. This, combined with his previous offences, may have been the reason for his internment at the notorious Fleet Prison at the dissolution of Parliament that year. A fervent supporter of Sir Anthony Kingston in the House of Commons, Pleydell came to be associated with Sir Henry Dudley's plot to exile Mary and ensure the succession of the future Queen Elizabeth to the throne (a foiled venture which led to Kingston's unexplained death and Dudley's voluntary exile to France); the Star Chamber accused Gabriel of inciting riots opposing Mary's reign. He was therefore "regarded as a ringleader" of the conspiracy and claimed parliamentary privilege when the Star Chamber found him guilty during the Michaelmas term of the 1555 session. The charges were supported by a £500 bond and a writ ordered by the court, possibly a crown action to intimidate future opposition in Parliament. The Commons accepted his claim that his privilege had been infringed and sent a delegation led by Sir Robert Rochester on 6 December to the House of Lords in support of his immunity.

Lawyers David Lewis and Thomas Martin, witnessed by Rochester, Sir William Petre and four unnamed members, declared the opinion of all Chief Justices, Serjeants-at-Law and Master of the Rolls Sir Nicholas Hare that Pleydell's privilege had not been infringed and the charges would persist. The Commons, dissatisfied with the ruling, refused to allow further action against Pleydell and may have blocked other suits accusing him until its dissolution three days later. Pleydell was released from prison on 28 December 1555, after paying an additional bond of £500 to the crown. His freedom was conditional on returning to the Star Chamber to pay another £45 on the first day of its next term, which he did. At his release Pleydell told the Privy Council that he was punished for "speaking his conscience ... in a bill concerning the commonwealth", an opinion he subsequently echoed abroad. The Star Chamber considered his comments slanderous; it is unclear whether judicial action was taken regarding them.

=== Protection of felons ===
In 1557 Pleydell was charged in the chamber by former associate John Berwick, who accused him of protecting two felons from punishment. The men (one convicted of murder and the other of abetting a theft) were Pleydell's servants in his capacity as chief ranger and keeper of Savernake Forest. Berwick, assumed by the historian Stanley Thomas Bindoff to be acting out of jealousy, was the previous holder of the titles and involved in a dispute with Pleydell over the rights to property near the forest. Pleydell enlisted the aid of serving and former members of parliament, including William Button, Henry Clifford, Griffith Curteys and John Hooper, in July. Their duty was to examine witnesses and evidence on both sides of the argument, and they presented a list of 240 articles concerning the servants' activities. Pleydell's efforts were seen by the court as an attempt to undermine the integrity of the Queen's justices and, perhaps, to incite rebellion among his supporters. This, in addition to breaching a commitment to meet regularly with the Privy Council under recognizance after his imprisonment, led to his indictment by Attorney-General Edward Griffin during the Michaelmas term. Pleydell was incarcerated in the Tower of London, forfeiting his two £500 bonds. He was released for good behaviour on 19 December, and left for the home of cloth merchant Thomas Garrard (a kinsman of the William Garrard with whom Pleydell served as Member for Wootton Bassett) after posting a £1,000 bond.

=== Forgery ===
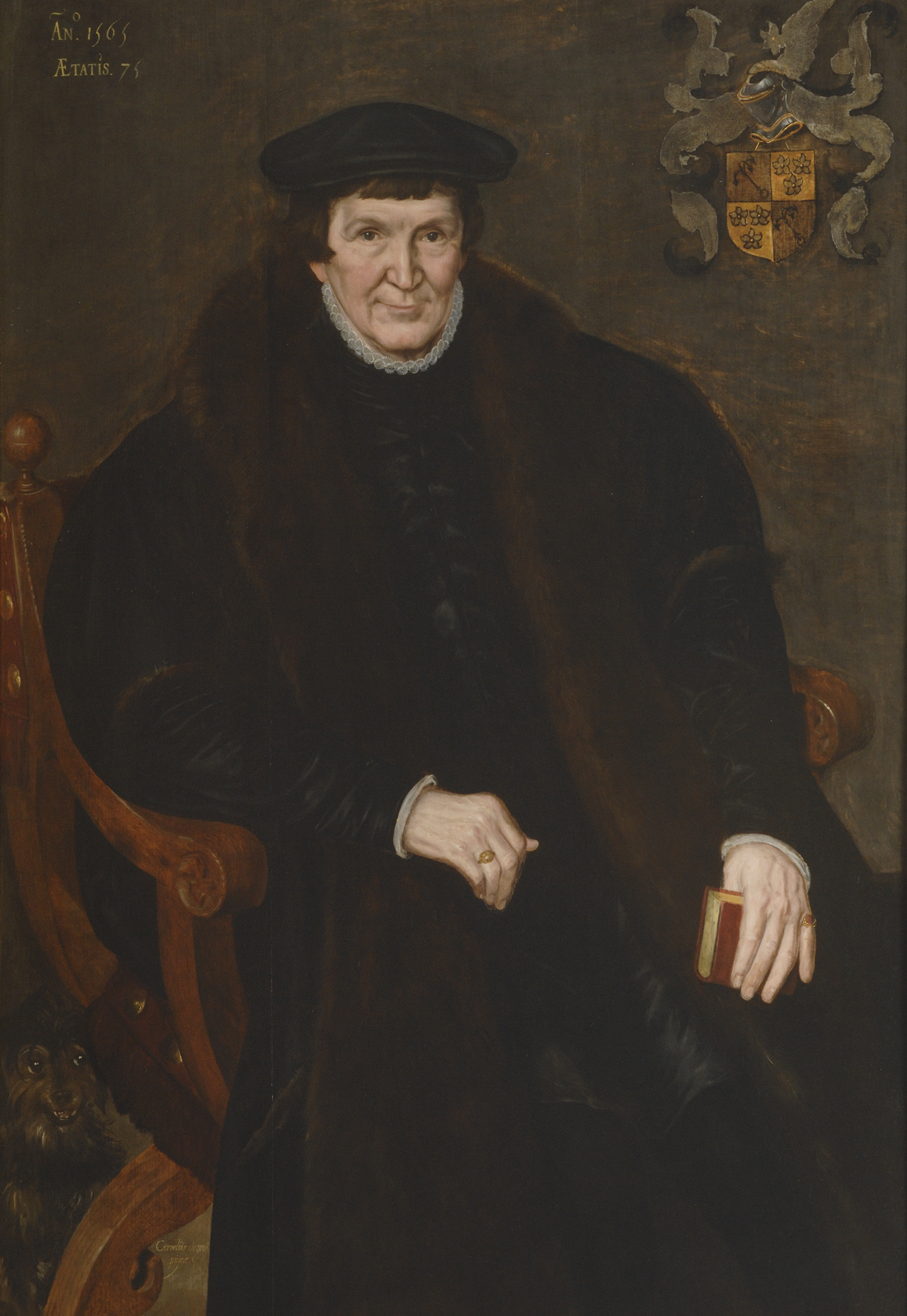
Sir William Cordell (probably pictured) expressed "great and vehement suspicion" of Pleydell.

Multiple allegations of forgery were brought against Pleydell in the Court of Chancery. Although the circumstances of many are unknown, a significant suit was initiated by Member for Chippenham Francis Newdigate at the start of the 1563 parliamentary session, when Pleydell is known to have been in a considerable amount of debt. Newdigate, second husband of Anne Seymour (Pleydell's employer), accused Pleydell of forgery with regard to the manor of Monkton in his constituency, which his spouse owned and Gabriel had leased since 1559. Details are unclear, but Newdigate introduced the case to the House of Commons between 11 and 27 February 1563, probably in light of discussion surrounding the proposed Forgery Act 1563 (5 Eliz.1 c.14). On 22 March, the Commons assembled a committee made up of Recorder of London Richard Onslow, Sir Nicholas Arnold, Walter Haddon, Thomas Norton and Master of the Rolls Sir William Cordell to investigate Newdigate's suspicions. Cordell's involvement as an official of the judiciary may indicate that Pleydell had again claimed parliamentary privilege against Newdigate's allegations, since the case was heard in the Court of Chancery while he was a sitting Member for Wootton Bassett. The committee expressed "great and vehement suspicion" of Pleydell in a report which he read and answered. On 10 April the House ordered that copies of committee documents should be given to Pleydell and Newdigate and that Pleydell's evidence would be kept by the Commons, and no further mention of the affair is evident.

The later career of Sir Andrew Baynton, with whom Pleydell had served as Member for Marlborough, was overshadowed by financial difficulty. In a perceived attempt to gain court favour and reduce his debts, Baynton entrusted Thomas Seymour with his lands (presumably temporarily). When Seymour was executed for treason in 1549, the lands fell into the possession of the crown. Queen Mary negotiated their sale to several members of the Wiltshire gentry, including Nicholas Snell and Pleydell. Gabriel would acquire the manor houses of the Bremhill and Bromham parishes in 1562. Pleydell is thought to have gone further in the pursuit of Baynton's estates; he and Henry Sharington were to be the executors of his will upon his death in 1564. Assigning themselves his properties in Chippenham, the couple (described by Alison Wall in the Oxford Dictionary of National Biography as "scoundrels" and by R. J. W. Swales as "unscrupulous adventurers") directed Baynton's money and estates to themselves, contrary to his intended entailment of the assets to his brother Edward. Sharington has consequently been described by Wall as "corrupt" and Pleydell as "notorious"; (Note: Wall mistakenly references Sir William Sharington as the forger, Henry's older brother. Though he had a reputation for embezzlement and conspiracy, William died in 1553; the will in question was produced three days before Baynton's death in 1564.) according to Bindoff, the action "confirm[s] for Gabriel Pleydell a niche in parliamentary history, detract[ing] still further from his reputation".

Pleydell's signature, taken from the 1566 document that released to Edward Baynton the titles attached to his late brother's property (Note: Gabriel's son, Oliver, and his son-in-law, William Bayly (a lawyer of the Middle Temple), were also signatories. The settlement was witnessed by several Wiltshire gentlemen, including Richard Mompesson.)

Pleydell released any titles inherited from the acquired estates, which included the manors of the Clench and Stanley hamlets, to Edward Baynton (Andrew's brother) on 19 July 1566 and the Privy Council therefore rejected allegations of forgery against him. Edward had long been suspicious of Pleydell and Sharington, and brought an unsuccessful forgery charge against them to a prerogative court as early as July 1560. He also ordered an attack on Pleydell's servants after his acquisition of the Bremhill and Bromham properties.

Pleydell, his patron Sir John Thynne and others were indicted in 1564 and he returned to Fleet Prison charged with illegal hunting in Selwood Forest. Pleydell was given leave under escort to attend impending "great suits" against him (probably related to the Baynton family's forgery litigation). He was again accused of similar offences years later, and the prosecution called Pleydell and his accomplices "persons of long time acquainted with such lewd devices and practices".

=== Later controversy ===
Other suits were brought against Pleydell in later life. In 1587 he was to appear before the Privy Council for mediation in an unclear suit initiated by his successor to the Wootton Bassett seat, Sir Henry Knyvet, now knighted. He is listed as living in Towcester, Northamptonshire for the Kynvet proceedings, possibly related to a family tie with the Saunders of nearby Syresham. In July 1590 a clerk of the Privy Council registered Pleydell as having returned indefinitely to the estate in Midgehall.

== Death and bequests ==
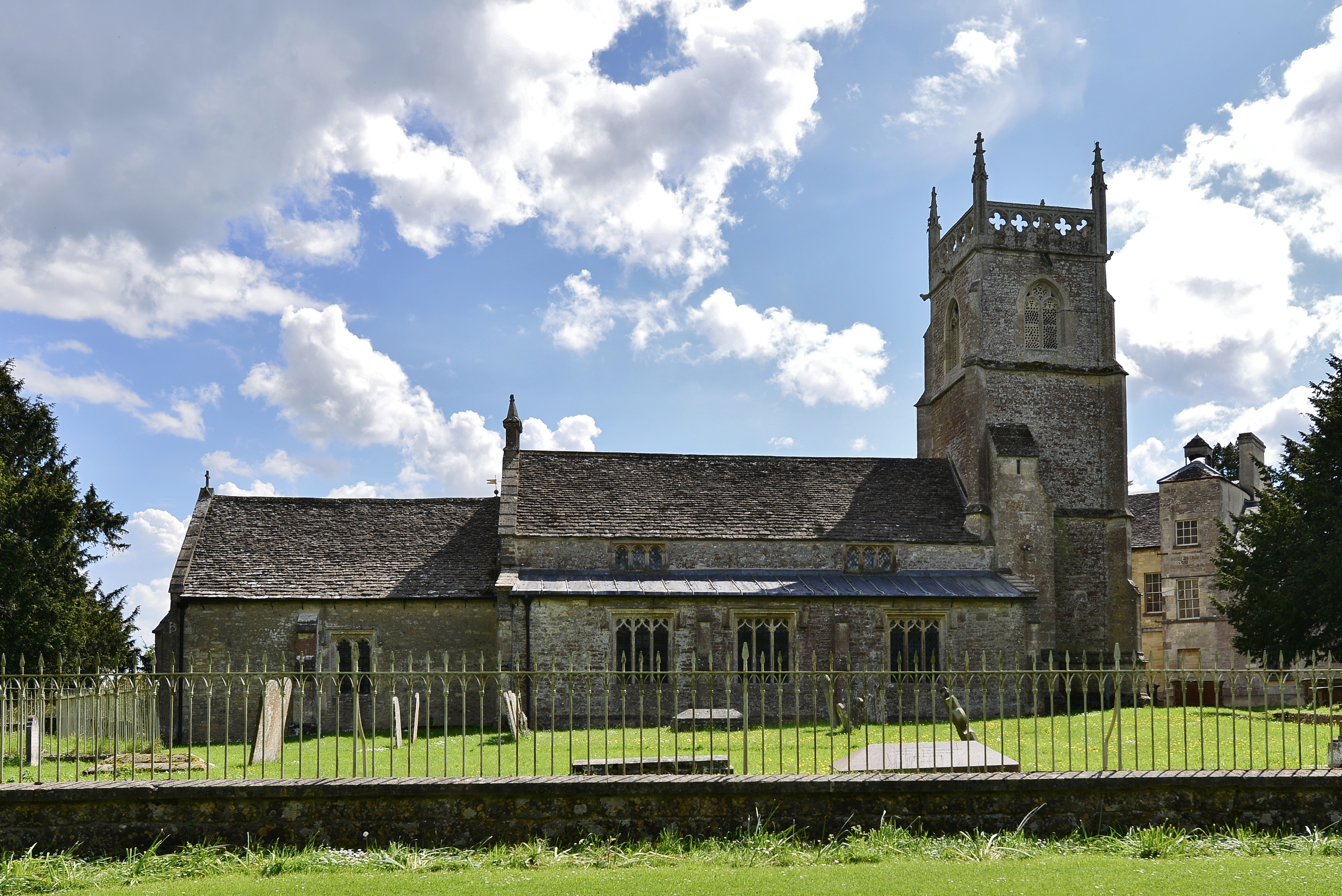
Exterior of St Mary's Church, Lydiard Tregoze, Pleydell's burial place

Pleydell, "sick in body", wrote his will on 19 December 1590; the document, furnished by creditor Oliver Frye on 3 February 1591, places his death between the two dates. His wife received ten cows and 100 sheep (then valued at about £60) and half of his personal possessions and household goods at the Midgehall estate. (Note: The relative value of £60 in 1591 equates to roughly £13,700 in 2015; this accounts for the increase in retail price index (RPI) percentage between the two years. Pleydell suggested that selling the livestock was a viable option in his will.) Each of his servants and his eventual burial place, St Mary's Church in Lydiard Tregoze, were to receive 10 shillings, and the combined poor of the parish 20 shillings. The profits from some of Pleydell's lands were entrusted to political associates Sir Charles Danvers, Sir John Danvers, Sir John St. John and Sir Edward Baynton, now knighted; it was hoped that Pleydell's grandson Charles (then a minor) would inherit a considerable fortune. The remainder was gifted to Agnes, his only daughter and sole executrix; she paid the document's overseers, Richard Danvers and Gabriel's nephew Robert Wells, 20 shillings for their services.

Parliament of England
Preceded by John Seymour; Robert Huick	Member for Wootton Bassett; March 1553; With: William Garrard	Succeeded by Henry Poole; John Throckmorton
Preceded by Peter Taylor alias Perce; John Broke	Member for Marlborough; 1555; With: Sir Andrew Baynton	Succeeded by William Daniell; William Fleetwood
Preceded by Christopher Dysmars; Humphrey Moseley	Member for Wootton Bassett; 1563–1567; With: Matthew Poyntz	Succeeded by Henry Knyvet; John Winchcombe
