= A Tour thro' the Whole Island of Great Britain =

Book by English author Daniel Defoe

A Tour Thro' the Whole Island of Great Britain
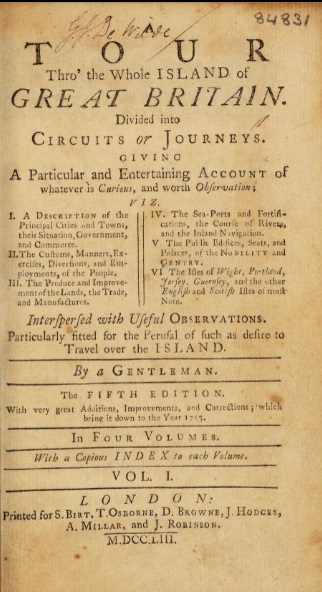
- Author: Daniel Defoe
- Original title: A tour thro' the whole island of Great Britain, divided into circuits or journies. Giving a particular and diverting account of whatever is curious and worth observation, viz. I.
- Language: English
- Subject: Great Britain
- Genre: Travelogue
- Published: 1724
- Publisher: George Strahan
- Publication place: United Kingdom
- OCLC: 1264944631

A Tour Thro' the Whole Island of Great Britain is an account of his travels by English author Daniel Defoe, first published in three volumes between 1724 and 1727. Other than Robinson Crusoe, Tour was Defoe's most popular and financially successful work during the eighteenth century. Pat Rogers notes that in Defoe's use of the "literary vehicle (the 'tour' or 'circuit') that could straddle the literal and the imaginative," "Nothing...anticipated Defoe's Tour". Thanks in part to his extensive travels and colourful background as a soldier, businessman, and spy, Defoe had "hit on the best blend of objective fact and personal commentary" in his descriptions of locations and trips around Britain.

== Composition and structure ==
The Tour is roughly divided into several tours, or circuits, around Britain. Volume 1 contains three letters. The first two, through Essex, Colchester, Harwich, Suffolk, Norfolk, and Cambridgeshire, and through the Kent Coast, Maidstone, Canterbury, Sussex, Hampshire, and Surrey, are complete circuits, both beginning and ending in London. Letter 3 describes a journey out to Land's End, while Letter 4 starts Volume 2 with the journey back. Letter 5 focuses on London and the Court. Volume 2 ends with Letters 6 and 7 describing a path out to Anglesey and back. Finally, in Volume 3, the narrator begins at the Trent or the Mersey and slowly travels northwards from the Midlands, taking up Letters 8 through 10. Scotland is divided into three convenient units for Letters 11 through 13.

Defoe did not necessarily travel to all of these locations, and certainly did not travel through them as or just before he was writing the work; rather, he relied on his past journeys, likely during his time as a merchant or while working for politician Robert Harley in the early 18th century, and, at times, relied on or was inspired by other travel literature such as William Camden's Britannia and John Strype's new version of John Stow's Survey of London.

== Publication history ==
Following the first edition, printed between 1724 and 1727, the Tour was published several more times. A decade after the original printing, printer and future novelist Samuel Richardson secured the rights and printed the second edition of the Tour, releasing an edition with substantial revisions on 13 October 1738. He was responsible for at least some of the revisions in this edition, as well as in the subsequent editions of 1742, 1748, 1753, and 1761–62. Richardson's biographers comment that a "travel book seems an odd thing for Richardson to have worked on, since few men were less travelled," and note that, "as it is revised [by Richardson], the Tour becomes less and less like a travel book".
