= Walter Winston =

16th-century English politician

Member of Parliament for Wootton Bassett
- In office 1529–?

Personal details
- Born: by 1502
- Died: 1540 or later
- Spouse: Margaret Baynham
- Relations: David Broke, Sir John Brydges, Richard Tracy (relatives)
- Occupation: Politician

Walter Winston (by 1502 – 1540 or later), of Randwick, Gloucestershire, was an English politician.

== Family ==
Winston belonged to a gentry family from Gloucestershire and was married to Margaret Baynham, daughter of the prominent Baynham family. He was related to other MPs: David Broke, Sir John Brydges and Richard Tracy.

== Career ==
He was a Member (MP) of the Parliament of England for Wootton Bassett in 1529 during the reign of Henry VIII.

Parliament of England
Preceded by ? ?	Member of Parliament for Wootton Bassett; 1529; With: Richard Tracy	Succeeded by ? ?
