= Robert Huick =

16th-century English physician

Robert Huicke
- Born: 1515?
- Died: 6 September 1580
- Occupation: Physician

Robert Huick, Huicke, or Hewicke (by 1515 – 6 September 1580), of London, Enfield and St. Martin-in-the-Fields, Middlesex, was an English physician. He was also briefly a member of parliament for a few weeks in the years 1547 and 1553. He was educated at Merton College, University of Oxford. By 1546, he was married to Elizabeth Slighfield, a sister of Henry and Walter Slighfield of Peckham, Kent; they had one or two daughters. He later married Mary Woodcock, and they had one daughter. One of his daughters was Anna Huick, wife of Sir Mark Steward (1524-1604), MP, of Stuntney in Cambridgeshire. Huick was an academic of the University of Oxford and served as Principal of St Alban Hall from 1535 to 1536. He was also a physician and was briefly a Member of the Parliament of England for Wootton Bassett in 1547 and for Camelford in March 1553.

== Biography ==
Huicke was a native of Berkshire. He was educated at Oxford, where he was admitted B.A. in 1529, and was elected fellow of Merton College there in the same year. He proceeded M.A. in February 1532-3 (Oxf. Univ. Reg. Oxf. Hist. Soc., i. 153). On 10 March 1534-5 he became principal of St. Alban Hall. A man of solid learning he regarded the writings of the schoolmen with contempt, calling them `the destruction of good wits,' The commissary thought this sufficient reason for depriving him of his office; nor was he restored, though the members of the hall petitioned Cromwell on 13 September 1535 in his favour (Letters, &c., of Henry VIII, ed. Gairdner, ix. 122). In 1536 he was admitted a fellow of the Royal College of Physicians, and proceeded M.D. at Cambridge in 1538. He was censor of the College of Physicians in 1541, 1556, 1557, 1558, and 1559; was named an elect in 1550, was president in 1551, 1552, and 1564, and consiliarius in 1553, 1559, 1560, and 1561. He was physician to Henry VIII and Catherine Parr, and was also a witness of the latter's will. In 1546 Huicke sought a divorce from his wife Elizabeth. Dr. John Croke, who tried the suit, gave sentence in favour of Mrs. Huicke. Huicke thereupon appealed to the privy council. Examinations were made at Greenwich on 11 and 12 May 1546. The lords, after hearing both of them face to face, wrote to Secretary Petre, exonerating Mrs. Huicke from all blame, and strongly condemning her husband's cruelty and deceit. Edward VI, by letters patent dated 4 July 1550, appointed Huicke his physician extraordinary, with the annual stipend of 50l. He was also one of the physicians to Queen Elizabeth. On 28 Feb. 1561-2 the sub-warden and fellows of Merton College addressed a letter to Sir William Cecil in favour of Huicke's appointment as warden of that house (Cal. State Papers, Dom. 1547-80, p. 195). In November 1564 he was admitted a member of the Inner Temple (Members, &c., 1547-1660, ed. W. H. Cooke, p. 55). He took part in the Physic Act kept at Cambridge on 7 August 1564, `her majesty merrily jesting with him when he desired her licence.' He also disputed in the Physic Act before the queen at Oxford on 5 Sept. 1566, and on the following day was incorporated M.D. in that university (Reg. i. 264). He was subsequently appointed chief physician to the queen, who in 1570 granted him a mansion called 'White Webbs House,' in Enfield, Middlesex (Lysons, Environs, ii. 304). By 1575 he had apparently got rid of his wife, for on 2 November of that year, being then resident in St. Martin-in-the-Fields, he obtained a general license to marry Mary Woodcocke, spinster, of the city of London (Chester, London Marriage Licences, ed. Foster, col. 738). Huicke died at his house at Charing Cross. His will, dated 27 August 1580, was proved on 17 April 1581 (P. C. C. 13, Darcy). Therein he desired to be buried in the chancel of Harlington Church, Middlesex. His wife Mary survived him, together with three daughters, Ann, Atalanta, married to William Chetwynde, and Elizabeth. He is author of 'Poemata ad R. Eliz.,' preserved in the British Museum, Royal MS. 12. A. xxxviii.

Parliament of England
Preceded by Edmund Brydges; Hugh Westwood	Member of Parliament for Wootton Bassett; 1547; With: John Seymour	Succeeded by Gabriel Pleydell; William Garrard
