= Hugh Westwood =

16th-century English politician

Hugh Westwood (by 1500 – 1559), of Chedworth, Gloucestershire, was an English politician.

== Family ==
There is no information on Westwood's ancestry. At some point by 1521, he married a woman named Agnes. At some point in 1544 or after, he married Jane née Baynham, a daughter of Sir Alexander Baynham of Westbury-on-Severn, the widow of Robert Wye of Lipyeate, Somerset. He is not recorded to have had any legitimate children, but had one illegitimate son.

== Career ==
He was a Member (MP) of the Parliament of England for Wootton Bassett in 1545.

Parliament of England
Preceded by ? ?	Member of Parliament for Wootton Bassett; 1545; With: Edmund Brydges	Succeeded by John Seymour; Robert Huick
