= Elizabeth Jocelin =

Elizabeth Brooke Jocelin (sometimes spelled "Joceline" or "Joscelin") was an English writer believed to have lived from about 1595 to 1622. She is best known for her work The Mother's Legacy to her Vnborn Child. The book was first published two years after Jocelin's death in childbirth.

== Early life ==
Elizabeth was the daughter of Sir Richard Brooke of Norton, Cheshire, and his wife Joan, daughter of William Chaderton, bishop of Lincoln. Her parents separated, and her mother returned home. Jocelin's grandfather, Bishop Chaderton, was mainly responsible for her upbringing. Elizabeth's childhood was therefore passed in the house of Bishop Chaderton, who educated her. She was extremely well versed in art, religion and language. According to her editor Thomas Goad, she had an exceptional memory.

== Later life ==
In 1616, she married Tourell Jocelin of Cambridgeshire. Foreboding her death in childbirth, she wrote a letter which gently but earnestly exhorted her son or daughter to piety and good conduct; and a letter to her husband, giving him advice as to the bringing up of the child. These works are thought to have been written at Crowlands, Oakington. She bore a daughter on 12 October 1622, and died of puerperal fever nine days afterwards. The child, named Theodora, became the wife of Samuel Fortrey.

The Jocelins appeared to lead a rather happy marriage, one that appeared to be mainly based on genuine love. In The Mother's Legacy to her Vnborn Child, Jocelin writes of how excited she is to be carrying her husband's child and that they have been working together to plan the best possible life for their child

Jocelin is noted for being "one of the most notable young women of the times of James I”

== The Legacie ==
The Legacie was first published in 1624 with a long Approbation by Thomas Goad, giving some account of Elizabeth Jocelin's life. The second edition is dated 1624 and the third 1625. An exact reprint of the third edition, with an introduction by an anonymous Edinburgh editor, appeared in 1852. The edition printed at Oxford, 'for the satisfaction of the person of quality herein concerned,' in 1684, and reprinted at the end of C. H. Cranford's Sermons in 1840, is an altered one, the editor having made changes in religious matters. The manuscript of the Legacie is in the British Museum (Addit. MS. 27467). It is still somewhat contentious whether the manuscript is by Jocelin, and whether Goad's editorial work brought in substantive change in the content.

Jocelin wrote The Mother’s Legacy to her Vnborn Child during the Early Modern period, when women were typically defined by their existence in the domestic sphere. Jocelin's work kept in line with the expectations of women during the period because of her clear dedication to her position as a mother.

One of the idiosyncratic things about the mother's advice text is Jocelin's choice of tone and word use to insure that whether her child is a boy or a girl he or she will be able to follow the advice she leaves behind. There are clearly different expectations and techniques to raising a son or daughter and Jocelin makes sure to acknowledge these differences while leaving advice for both. For example, she addresses her daughter to respect, obey and be a good mother. Jocelin writes about her desire to protect her daughter “from a potentially difficult and uncomfortable way of life.” Jocelin has been criticised for her different approaches to raising her child based on its gender. Much like women of her time Jocelin desired for her daughter to be acceptable to society even if it meant limiting her intelligence or unhappiness.

One of the largest parts of The Mother’s Legacy to her Vnborn Child is the religious advice that Jocelin offers to her unborn child. She urges the child to pray regularly, avoid temptations, acknowledge holy days and be charitable.

The tone of the book is one filled with optimism and pride over becoming a new mother. Jocelin is clearly excited about meeting her child even though she seems to understand that birthing the child will be a great risk to herself.

Much of the books instruction is directed toward Jocelin's husband including how to properly select a wet nurse for their child if Elizabeth should die.

Excerpts from The Mother's Legacy to her Vnborn Child:

“I desire her bringing up may bee learning the Bible, as my sisters doe, good housewifery, writing, and good works: other learning a woman needs not; though I admire it in those whom God hath blest with descretion, yet I desired not much in my owne, having seene that sometimes women have greater portions of learning than wisdome, which is of no better use to them than a main saile to a flye-boat, which runs it under water. But where learning and wisdom meet in a vertuous disposed woman she is the fittest closet for all goodnesse. She is like a well-balanced ship that may beare all her saile. She is, Indeed, I should but shame my selfe, if I should goe about to praise her more...Yet I leave it to thy will...If thou desirest a learned daughter, I pray God give her a wise and religious heart, that she may use it to his glory, thy comfort, and her own salvation.”

“And if thou beest a daughter, thou maist perhaps thinke I have lost my labour; but reade on, and thou shalt see my love and care of thee and thy salvation is as great, as if thou wert a sonne, and my feare greater”.

== Posthumous legacy ==
Elizabeth Jocelin is remembered as a dedicated mother and an iconic woman of her time because of her dedication to making sure her child was raised properly even after her death. The Mother's Legacy to her Vnborn Child is regarded as one of the most significant works of the time because of the intimate view it gives of the mindset, beliefs and ideals of women of the time.
