= William Strahan (publisher) =

Scottish printer and publisher (1715–1785)

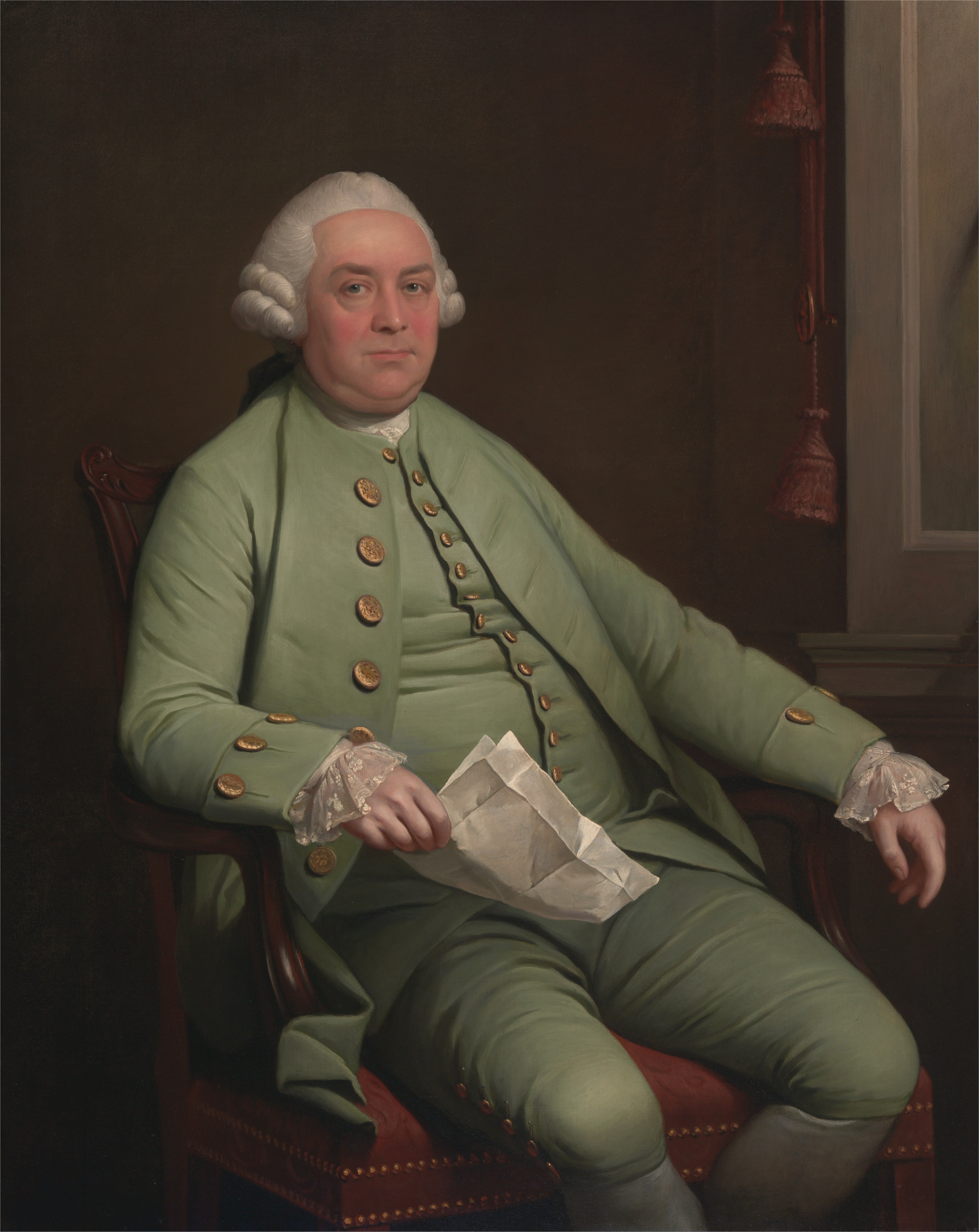
William Strahan (Mason Chamberlin)

William Strahan (24 March 1715 – 9 July 1785) was a Scottish printer and publisher, and a politician who sat in the House of Commons between from 1774 to 1784. He was a correspondent and later a good friend of Benjamin Franklin.

== Early life ==
Born in Edinburgh as William Strachan, and educated at the Royal High School, Strahan was the son of George Strachan, an Edinburgh solicitor and grandson of John Strachan, professor of divinity at the University of Edinburgh. originally apprenticed to an Edinburgh printer but became a Master Printer in London (at which time he changed the spelling of his name). In 1738 he was made a Freeman of the City of London and a freeman of the Stationers' Company. He married Margaret Penelope Elphinstone, daughter of Edinburgh Episcopal Clergyman William Elphnstone, at St Mary Le Bow on 20 July 1738. They had five children, two daughters and three sons, one of whom, Andrew, would succeed him as King's Printer.

== Printing to publishing ==
Diversifying from printing to publishing, Strahan built up a successful business, at one time employing 50 men. He was Samuel Johnson's chief publisher, being entrusted with the printing of Johnson's Dictionary, and also published the works of the philosophers David Hume and Adam Smith, and the historian Edward Gibbon. Prominent 18th-century Freemason William Preston had attended the same school as Strahan in Edinburgh and was employed by Strahan, as an editor, particularly of David Hume's works. From 1770, Strahan was Printer to the King. Strahan was also the printer for the successful London bookseller Andrew Millar, as well as his longtime friend and business partner. Between 1740 and 1765 Strahan moved his London premises four times in the area between St Bride's and the Strand. By 1770 he owned the biggest printing operation in the kingdom, comprising three separate printing businesses in six buildings.

== Friendship with Benjamin Franklin ==
For many years, Strahan attended debates in Parliament and wrote reports of the proceedings that were widely circulated; his paragraphs of political news were frequently printed in The Pennsylvania Gazette, and he became a friend of its owner, Benjamin Franklin. His protégé, David Hall, succeeded Franklin at his print shop in Philadelphia when Franklin retired in 1747. At first he sympathised with the grievances of the American colonists, disapproving of the Stamp Act and publishing arguments in favour of a reconciliation in his London Chronicle.

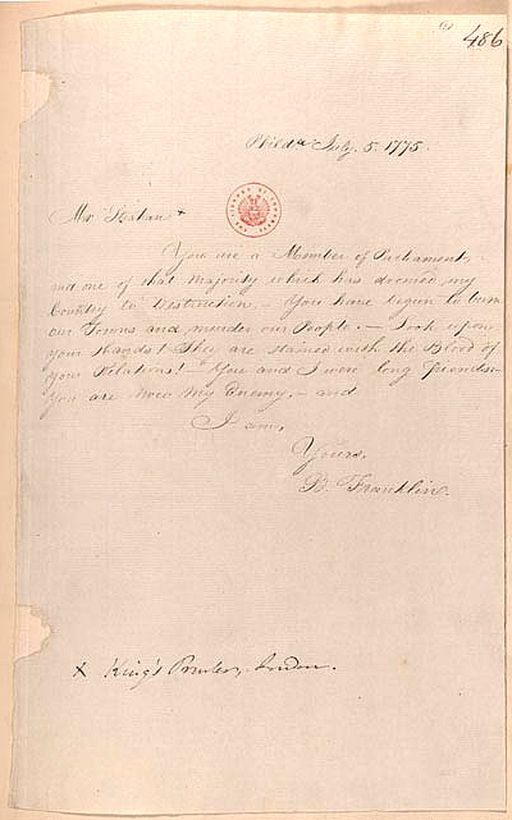
Benjamin Franklin to William Strahan, 5 July 1775, severing friendship

However, he later developed a much more hostile attitude, writing to Hume in 1775 "I am entirely for coercive methods with these obstinate madmen." He voted with Parliament, declaring the patriots as "rebels", which prompted Franklin to write him a letter, which he never sent, declaring "You are now my enemy, and I am yours". This hostility also led to Benjamin Franklin ending their friendship, but reconciling after the war.

Strahan and Franklin corresponded about politics and matters involving their printing businesses throughout much of their lives. There are approximately 130 surviving letters between the two men, many of which have been reprinted in The Papers of Benjamin Franklin.

== Parliamentary career ==
In 1774, Strahan purchased a seat as MP for the Wiltshire borough of Malmesbury, sitting as a supporter of Lord North's Tory administration. He represented that constituency until 1780, and then Wootton Bassett from 1780 to 1784, when he stood down because of ill health. He died the following year.

== Portrait by Reynolds ==
The original painting of Strahan by Reynolds is located at the National Portrait Gallery in London where it is part of the permanent collection. The painting was first exhibited in 1783.

== See also ==
- Early American publishers and printers
- List of early American publishers and printers

== Sources ==
- Labaree, Leonard W. (April 1966). "New Franklin Letters". The Yale University Library Gazette. 40 (4). Yale University Library: 188–193. JSTOR 40858095.

Parliament of Great Britain
Preceded by The Earl of Donegall; Hon. Thomas Howard	Member of Parliament for Malmesbury; 1774–1780; With: Hon. Charles James Fox	Succeeded by Viscount Lewisham; Viscount Fairford
Preceded by Major the Hon. Henry St John; Robert Scott	Member of Parliament for Wootton Bassett; 1780–1874; With: Major the Hon. Henry St John	Succeeded by Hon. George North; Hon. Robert Seymour Conway
