= Thomas Goad =

English clergyman, controversial writer, and rector

Thomas Goad (1576–1638) was an English clergyman, controversial writer, and rector of Hadleigh, Suffolk. A participant at the Synod of Dort, he changed his views there from Calvinist to Arminian, against the sense of the meeting.

== Life ==
He was born at Cambridge in August 1576, the second of the ten sons of Roger Goad by his wife, Katharine, eldest daughter of Richard Hill, citizen of London. He was educated at Eton College, and elected to a scholarship at King's College, Cambridge, on 1 September 1592; on 1 September 1595 he became fellow, B.A. in 1596, and lecturer in 1598. In 1600 he proceeded M.A. Anthony à Wood wrongly identifies him as the jurist Thomas Goad.

At Christmas 1606 he was ordained priest, and commenced B. D, in 1607 . In 1609 he was bursar of King's; in 1610 he succeeded his father in the family living of Milton, Cambridge, which he held together with his fellowship; in 1611 he was appointed dean of divinity, and very shortly afterwards he left Cambridge to reside at Lambeth as domestic chaplain to Archbishop George Abbot, his father's old pupil at Guildford Free School. In 1615 he took the degree of D.D.; on 16 February 1618 he was made precentor of St. Paul's Cathedral, and in 1618 he was presented by Abbot to the rectory of Hadleigh, Suffolk. He also held the rectory of Black Notley, Essex, and probably that of Merstham, Surrey.

In 1619 the king, at the instance, it is said, of Abbot, sent him out to replace the ill Joseph Hall at the Synod of Dort. At Dort Goad, previously a Calvinist, went over to the Arminians. He is supposed to have lost a chance of the preferments which were granted to his colleagues by King James, and his name was omitted, accidentally perhaps, in the acts of the synod. He and his colleagues received the acknowledgments of the States-General, their travelling expenses home, and a gold medal apiece weighing three quarters of a pound in weight. Goad returned to his chaplaincy.

In 1623 he was engaged as assistant to Daniel Featley in disputations which were held with Jesuits: George Musket, John Percy alias Fisher, and others. About 1624 William Prynne showed Goad a portion of his Histriomastix, but failed to convince him of the soundness of his arguments. Goad was twice proctor in convocation for Cambridge, and was prolocutor of the lower house in the convocation which was held at Oxford in 1625, acting in the stead of John Bowle, who absented himself through fear of the plague.

About 1627 he became resident at Hadleigh. He wrote the inscription upon Casaubon's tomb in Westminster Abbey. He embellished Hadleigh church and rectory with paintings and inscriptions. These pictures were mostly executed, after Goad's design, by Benjamin Coleman, a Hadleigh artist. He intended to create a public theological library there. On 22 October 1633 he was made dean of Bocking, Essex, jointly with John Barkham and later that year was appointed an ecclesiastical commissioner for England and Wales.

He died on 8 August 1638, and was buried in the chancel of Hadleigh Church next day. He left land at Milton and his Dort medal to King's College.

== Works ==
At college he was known for skill in writing verses, and he contributed to the collections on the death of William Whitaker, 1597; on the accession of James I, 1603; on the death of Henry Frederick, Prince of Wales, 1612; on the return of Prince Charles from Spain, 1623; and on the king's return from Scotland in 1633. 'Till the day of his death,' says Thomas Fuller in Worthies of England, 'he delighted in making of verses'.

He wrote two anti-Catholic populist tracts in 1623: on Robert Drury, and as author or editor the Friers Chronicle, a collection of nasty sexual tales supposedly by an apostate Catholic. Appended to Lawrence Womack's anonymous treatise on The Result of False Principles, London, 1661, is a tract by Goad. An 'approbation' by Goad appeared in the 1724 edition of Elizabeth Jocelin's The Mother's Legacy to her unborn Child, 1st edition, 1624. In 1627 he wrote A Disputation, posthumously published. He was also the editor of the 'prodigy pamphlet' Vox Piscis (1627).

== Notes and references ==
=== Sources ===
- Myers, Benjamin (2006). Milton's Theology of Freedom. Berlin: Walter De Gruyter.

Attributions

- This article incorporates text from a publication now in the public domain: "Goad, Thomas (1576-1638)". Dictionary of National Biography. London: Smith, Elder & Co. 1885–1900.
