= Thomas Estcourt Cresswell =

English landowner and politician

Thomas Estcourt Cresswell (12 July 1712 – 14 November 1788) was an English landowner and politician.

== Biography ==
He was the son of Richard Cresswell (MP for Bridgnorth and then Wootton Bassett) and his wife Elizabeth Estcourt, daughter and heiress of Sir Thomas Estcourt, of Pinkney Park, near Malmesbury in Wiltshire.

He began his career as a merchant trading with China and India, but ceased this occupation around 1732.

He inherited the heavily encumbered Pinkney Park estate in 1743 from his father. Cresswell was returned as Member of Parliament for Wootton Bassett from 1754 to 1774. He died at his seat in Pinkney Park on 14 November 1788.

He had gained a degree of notoriety as a bigamist after his marriage in February 1744 to a wealthy heiress, Miss Anne Warneford, granddaughter and eventual heir of Sir Edmund Warneford of Sevenhampton and Bibury, Gloucestershire. Anne had married Cresswell in good faith and had borne him two children but another woman, his cousin Elizabeth Scrope, sued on the grounds of bigamy, claiming a prior Fleet marriage. Miss Scrope's suit was successful, the Cresswell–Warneford marriage was declared null and void, and the children (a son, Estcourt, and a daughter) were bastardised. However, a third marriage was revealed by another search through the Fleet records that antedated the others; thus Cresswell's last two "marriages" were bigamous. It was stated that he endeavoured to keep possession of both wives at the same time by a "base and unmanly contrivance". For a considerable time Miss Scrope retained a deep sense of her injuries; in 1749 she published a pamphlet in her own name, called Miss Scrope's Answer to Mr. Cresswell's Narrative.

Cresswell had at least another four illegitimate children with a Miss Catharine Jenkins between 1749 and 1755, the three survivors of whom received substantial bequests from their father on a par with their half brother Estcourt, who was MP for Cirencester from 1768 to 1774.

A fictional account of some of these events is given in "Love and Avarice: Or, the Fatal Effects of Preferring Wealth to Beauty" by a 'Lady of Shropshire' published in 1749, in which Cresswell is Clodio and Anne Warneford Leonora.

Parliament of Great Britain
Preceded by Robert Neale; Martin Madan	Member of Parliament for Wootton Bassett with John Probyn 1754–1761; Henry St John 1761–1774; 1754–1774	Succeeded by Henry St John; Robert Scott
