= Henry St John (British Army officer) =

British Army officer and politician

General The Honourable Henry St John

Member of Parliament for Wootton Bassett
- In office 1802–1802 Serving with Robert Williams
- Preceded by: John Denison; Edward Clarke
- Succeeded by: Peter William Parker; Robert Williams
- In office 1761–1784 Serving with Thomas Estcourt Cresswell, Robert Scott, William Strahan
- Preceded by: John Probyn; Thomas Estcourt Cresswell
- Succeeded by: Hon.George North; Lord Robert Seymour

Personal details
- Born: 1738
- Died: 3 April 1818 (aged 79–80)
- Spouse: Barbara Bladen (m. 1771)
- Relations: Frederick St John, 2nd Viscount Bolingbroke (brother)
- Parent(s): John St John, 2nd Viscount St John; Anne Furnese
- Education: Eton College

Military service
- Allegiance: (United Kingdom) Great Britain
- Rank: General

General Henry St John (1738 – 3 April 1818) was a senior British Army officer and politician who sat in the House of Commons from 1768 to 1784 and briefly in 1802. He also served as a Groom of the Bedchamber.

== Early life ==
He was the younger son of John St John, 2nd Viscount St John and his wife Anne Furnese. His elder brother was Frederick St John, 2nd Viscount Bolingbroke. His younger sister, the Hon. Louisa St John, married William Bagot, 1st Baron Bagot.

His paternal grandparents were Henry St John, 1st Viscount St John and the former Angelica Magdalena (née Pellisary) Wharton, the widow of Philip Wharton who was the daughter of George Pellisary, Treasurer-General of the Navy to King Louis XIV of France. His mother was the half-sister, and heiress, of Sir Henry Furnese, 3rd Baronet, and the only child, by his first wife Anna Balam (daughter of Anthony Balam), of Sir Robert Furnese, 2nd Baronet, MP for Truro, New Romney, and Kent.

St John was educated at Eton College.

== Career ==
He joined the British Army in 1754 as an ensign in the Coldstream Regiment of Foot Guards from which he was promoted in 1758 to the rank of captain in the 18th (The Royal Irish) Regiment of Foot, then stationed in Ireland. In 1760 he was promoted Major in the 91st Regiment of Foot, made Lieutenant-Colonel in 1762 and put on half pay in 1763.

In 1767, he was appointed to the 67th Regiment of Foot, then on garrison duty in Minorca. He received the brevet rank of colonel in 1776, and was appointed colonel of the 36th Regiment of Foot in 1778, a position he held until his death. He was advanced to the rank of major-general in 1779, to that of lieutenant-general in 1787, and made full general on 26 January 1797.

He was appointed Groom of the Bedchamber to the Duke of York in 1737 and to the king from 1771 to 1784.

He was elected Member of Parliament for Wootton Bassett in 1761, sitting until 1784 and again in 1802, vacating his seat the same year.

== Personal life ==
In 1771, St John was married to Barbara Bladen (1733–1821), the eldest daughter, and co-heiress, of Thomas Bladen and the former Barbara Janssen (a daughter of Sir Theodore Janssen, 1st Baronet). Barbara was the sister of Harriet Bladen, the Dowager Countess of Essex (from her marriage to William Capell, 4th Earl of Essex).

St John died, without issue, on 3 April 1818.

Military offices
Preceded by Sir Richard Pierson	Colonel of the 36th Regiment of Foot; 1778–1818	Succeeded by Sir George Don
Parliament of Great Britain
Preceded by John Probyn; Thomas Estcourt Cresswell	Member of Parliament for Wootton Bassett; 1761–1784; With: Thomas Estcourt Cresswell (1761–1774); Robert Scott (1774–1780); William Strahan (1780–1784)	Succeeded by Hon.George North; Lord Robert Seymour
Parliament of the United Kingdom
Preceded by John Denison; Edward Clarke	Member of Parliament for Wootton Bassett; July–December, 1802; With: Robert Williams	Succeeded by Peter William Parker; Robert Williams
