= Samuel Fortrey =

English writer

Samuel Fortrey (1622–1681) was an English landowner and fen drainer, writer of England's Interest and Improvement, consisting in the increase of the Store and Trade of this Kingdom (Cambridge, 1663).

== Life ==
Fortrey, born on 11 June 1622, was the eldest son of Samuel Forterie, a merchant of Walbrook Ward, London, who was grandson of John de la Forterye, a Huguenot refugee from Lille, and owned a house at Kew, eventually bought by Queen Charlotte. He is identified with Samuel Fortrey of Richmond and Byall Fen, Isle of Ely, Clerk of the Deliveries of the Ordnance in the Tower of London, and a bailiff of the Bedford Level Corporation which drained the Fens renaming them the Great Level.

== Works ==
=== England's Interest and Improvement (1663) ===
England's Interest and Improvement is described on the title-page as "one of the gentlemen of his majesties most honourable privy chamber". It was reprinted in 1673, 1713, and 1744; in Sir Charles Whitworth's Scarce Tracts on Trade and Commerce, serving as a supplement to Davenant's Works, 1778, and in the Political Economy Club's Select Collection of Early English Tracts on Commerce (ed. McCulloch), 1856.

Its most specific advice is that immigration and enclosure should be encouraged, and that the king should set a good example by preferring fabrics of home manufacture. It was for many years frequently referred to by financial writers in consequence of a very circumstantial statement contained in it to the effect that the value of the English imports from France was £2,600,000, and the value of the exports to France £1,000,000, "by which it appears that our trade with France is at least sixteen hundred thousand pounds a year clear lost to this kingdom.Samuel Fortrey experimented with small wooden models in a tank using falling weights"

=== "A True and Natural Description of the Great Level of the Fenns" (1685) ===
This poem was published anonymously by Moses Pitt in 1685 and has subsequently been attributed to Samuel Fortrey. Pitt published History or Narrative of the Great Level of the Fens by Jonas Moore and added "A Postscript of the Bookseller to the Reader" which consisted of "A True and Natural Description of the Great Level of the Fenns".

The critic, Bridget Keegan, has highlighted this poem as depicting the viewpoint of the "gentlemen drainers" in opposition to the "fenland commoners". The anthropologist, Richard Irvine, has further argued that such poetic rhetoric was accompanied by cartographic representations of the fenlands which reinforced the conception of the draining of the Fens being "godly work" to "improve" the fens as "an immoral waste".

== Family ==
On 23 February 1647 Fortrey married Theodora Jocelin, the child for whom Elizabeth Jocelin wrote The Mother's Legacie to her Unborn Childe. His children included:

- His daughter, Mary married Sir Philip Parker, 2nd Baronet.
- His third son, James, groom of the bedchamber to James II, married Lady Belasyse.

He died in February 1681.

Military offices
Preceded by George Wharton	Clerk of the Deliveries of the Ordnance; 1670–1681	Succeeded by William Bridges
