= Robert Scott (died 1808) =

British politician

Robert Scott (c1746-1808) was a British politician who sat in the House of Commons between 1774 and 1780.

Scott was the son of Robert Scott of Lauder, Berwickshire, and his wife Elizabeth Pringle. Scott's father was one of a group of Scottish wine merchants, settled in Madeira and trading to the West Indies and other colonies in Africa and America, the continental colonies, and the Guinea coast. In about 1738 he left his partners John Scott and John Pringle in charge in Madeira, and moved to London and became senior partner in the firm of Scott and Pringle of Threadneedle Street. In 1767 he purchased the Crailing estate in Roxburghshire.

Robert Scott was educated at Eton College in 1757 and Trinity Hall, Cambridge. He entered Lincoln's Inn in 1762 and undertook the Grand Tour in 1765. He later joined his father in the business.

In 1774 he was returned as Member of Parliament for both Gatton and Wootton Bassett and chose to sit for Wootton Bassett. He did not stand for parliament again.

Scott married Emma Assheton Smith, daughter of Thomas Assheton Smith of Tedworth, Hampshire in 1782. His political views differed from those of his friend John Pringle and he sold Crailing in 1786 and left Scotland. He purchased Danesfield House in Buckinghamshire which he rebuilt in typical Georgian style. He died there 6 February 1808.

== Sources ==
- Waddesdon. Portrait of Emma Assheton Scott

Parliament of Great Britain
Preceded by Hon. John Damer; Joseph Martin	Member of Parliament for Gatton; 1774–1775; With: Sir William Mayne	Succeeded by Robert Mayne; William Adam
Preceded by Major the Hon. Henry St John; Thomas Estcourt Cresswell	Member of Parliament for Wootton Bassett; 1774–1780; With: Major the Hon. Henry St John	Succeeded by Major the Hon. Henry St John; William Strahan
