= Richard Tracy =

English lay Protestant reformer and Member of the Parliament (died 1569)

Richard Tracy (died 1569) was an English lay Protestant reformer and Member of Parliament.

== Life ==
He was the younger son of William Tracy, a noted Lutheran convert, graduated B.A. at Oxford on 27 June 1515, and was admitted student of the Inner Temple in 1519. In 1529 he was elected to the ‘reformation’ parliament as member for Wotton Basset, Wiltshire. For the next few years he was engaged in the struggle over his father's will.

In February 1533 he was granted Stanway, a manor belonging to Tewkesbury Abbey, which he made the home of his family. He adopted his father's religious views, and appears to have written a short treatise by 1533. In 1535 Tracy's works were classed as dangerous with those of Luther, Melanchthon, William Tyndale, and John Frith. In 1537 Tracy had been placed on the commission of the peace for Gloucestershire, and employed in work connected with the visitation of the monasteries in his shire.

In 1538 he was nominated for the shrievalty, but Henry VIII preferred Robert Acton, and in December 1539 he was appointed one of the squires to attend at the reception of Anne of Cleves. His reforming zeal led his friend and neighbour Hugh Latimer to express a wish that there were many more like him. With Thomas Cromwell's fall Tracy lost favour at court, and on 7 July 1546 his books were ordered to be burnt.

In 1548 he was appointed, under the act for the abolition of chantries, one of the commissioners of inquiry for Gloucestershire. In May 1551 he was imprisoned in the Tower for a letter, probably an attack on Warwick's government. He was released on 17 November 1552. On 9 June 1555 his religious views brought him under the notice of Queen Mary's council, but he cleared himself. On 19 September following, however, he again appeared on a charge of having behaved stubbornly towards the Bishop of Gloucester, and in January 1557 he was in trouble for refusing to pay a forced loan. After Elizabeth's accession Tracy served as High Sheriff of Gloucestershire in 1560–61, and in 1565 wrote a protest to William Cecil against the queen's retaining a crucifix in her chapel.

== Works ==
Probably his ‘Profe and Declaration of thys Proposition: Fayth only iustifieth’, dedicated to Henry VIII, but with no date, place, or printer's name, was Tracy's earliest work. It was followed in 1544 by ‘A Supplycation to our most Soueraigne Lorde, Kynge Henry the Eyght.’

In November 1548, during the discussions in convocation and parliament which preceded the issue of Edward VI's first Book of Common Prayer, Tracy published ‘A Bryef and short Declaracyon made wherebye euery Chrysten Man may knowe what is a Sacrament,’ London. He quotes largely from Augustine of Hippo.

Besides these, Tracy is said to have written ‘The Preparation to the Crosse and to Death .... in two bookes,’ 1540. This treatise, bound up with two by John Frith, was found in a cod's belly in Cambridge market in 1626 (see Vox Piscis), and was reprinted in that year by Boler and Milbourne.

== Family ==
By his wife Barbara, daughter of Sir Thomas Lucy (died 1525), Tracy had at least six sons and five daughters. The eldest surviving son, Paul Tracy of Stanway, was created a baronet in 1626. In 1543 Bartholomew Traheron, who had been educated at Tracy's expense and was called his son, dedicated to him his translation of John of Vigo's Surgery.
