= Joseph Mede =

English scholar (1586–1638)

Joseph Mede (1586 in Berden – 1638) was an English scholar with a wide range of interests. He was educated at Christ's College, Cambridge, where he became a Fellow in 1613. He is now remembered as a biblical scholar. He was also a naturalist and Egyptologist. He was a Hebraist, and became Lecturer of Greek.

== Early life ==
In the will of Thomas Meade of Berden, 1595 there is a bequest "Item I give and bequeath to Joseph my son sixty pounds of good and lawful money to be paid to him at his full age of one and twenty years."

According to Jeffrey K. Jue, in Heaven Upon Earth, “Little is known of Mede’s childhood, other than the fact that at ten years of age both he and his father fell ill from smallpox. His father never recovered and his mother remarried a certain Mr. Gower from Nasing. Mede had two sisters, Rebecca and Sister Casse.” That Joseph had a sister Rebecca is confirmed in his father’s will: “Item I give and bequeath to my two daughters that is to say Anna Meade and Rebecca Meade to every of [them] xxvii li vi s viii d of lawful money to be paid to them and every of them as they come to their several ages of xviii.”

According to Venn's Alumni Cantabrigienses, Thomas Meade, who had also been at Christ's College Cambridge, matriculating 1564, was "doubtless son of Edward Meade of Berden, Essex".

In 1603, while a student at Christ's College, Cambridge, Mede came across an open copy of Sextus Empiricus' Outlines of Pyrrhonism on another student's desk. Upon reading the book, he underwent a skeptical crisis. In search of some foundation for truth, he turned to studies of texts about the Millennium in the Bible.

== Works ==
His Clavis Apocalyptica (1627 in Latin, English translation 1643, Key of the Revelation Searched and Demonstrated) was a widely influential work on the interpretation of the Book of Revelation. It projected the end of the world by 1716: possibly in 1654. The book also posited that the Jews would be miraculously converted to Christianity before the second coming.

Christopher Hill considers that Mede deliberately refrained from publication. His interpretation of the Book of Daniel and The Apostasy of Latter Times were published posthumously. On demons, he explained at least some mental illness as demonic. His collected Works were published in 1665, edited by John Worthington.

== Theology ==
Joseph Mede held Arminian theological views.

== Influence ==
Those following Mede in part as a chronologist and interpreter included Thomas Goodwin, Pierre Jurieu, Isaac Newton, and Aaron Kinne (1745–1824). As a critical scholar of the Bible, he started the discussion of the possible multiple authorship of the Book of Zechariah, subsequently taken up by Richard Kidder (1633–1703) and many others.

Richard Popkin attributes Mede's interpretation to countering scepticism, which gave it power to convince others, including the Hartlib circle. John Coffey writes:

The ecumenist Scotsman John Dury, the German scientist Samuel Hartlib, and the Czech educationalist Comenius had each been profoundly influenced by the millenarianism of Alsted and Mede, and seem to have seriously entertained the idea that London was the centre from which human knowledge and divine rule would spread.

Coffey also says, however, that millenarianism was rare in the 1630s, coming in only later as an important force. William Twisse, of the Westminster Assembly, added a preface to the 1643 Key to the Revelation, a testimonial to its convincing power.

Among Mede's pupils at Christ's was Henry More. John Milton studied at Christ's in Mede's time, and is considered to have been influenced by his ideas; but scholars have not found evidence that he was a pupil.

Those following Mede's views in Doctrine of Demons include Arthur Ashley Sykes and Dr. Richard Mead.

== See also ==
- Vox Piscis

== Notes and references ==
=== Sources ===
- Nichols, James (1824). Calvinism and Arminianism Compared in their Principles and Tendency. Vol. 2. London: Longman.
