= Henry Pinnell =

English politician (1670 –c1721)

Henry Pinnell (1670 – before 18 April 1721) was an English politician who sat as MP for Wootton Bassett from 1695 till November 1701 and 1702 till 1705, and Camelford from 1705 till 1708.

Pinnell was baptised on 13 September 1670. He was the son of Henry Pinnell (died c. 1671) and Elizabeth, the daughter of Richard Jones and sister of Sir William Jones. He was matriculated at Trinity College, Oxford in 1685 and entered the Middle Temple in 1690.
