= John Pleydell (died 1608) =

English politician

John Pleydell (c. 1535 – 1608) was the member of Parliament for Cricklade in the parliament of 1593.

Pleydell was a younger son of a wealthy tenant farmer William Pleydell of Coleshill, Berkshire—now Oxfordshire—and Agnes Reason (daughter of Robert Reason of Corfe Castle, Dorset). He was a younger brother of Gabriel.
