= Richard Bruning (MP) =

16th-century English politician

Richard Bruning or Bryning (by 1531–1573/1580), was an English politician.

He was a member (MP) of the parliament of England for Wootton Bassett in 1555 and 1558.
