= Bartholomew Traheron =

English Protestant writer and Marian exile

Bartholomew Traheron (1510?–1558?) was an English Protestant writer and Marian exile.

== Life ==
Born about 1510, he is said to have been a native of Cornwall. Bartholomew was early left an orphan, and was brought up under the care of Richard Tracy of Toddington, Gloucestershire.

Traheron became a Minorite friar before 1527, when he is said to have been persecuted at Oxford for his religion by John London, Warden of New College. Subsequently, he moved to Cambridge, where he graduated B.A. in 1533, being still a friar. Soon afterwards leaving his order, he went abroad, travelling in Italy and Germany. In September 1537 he joined Heinrich Bullinger at Zurich, and in 1538 he was living at Strasburg. In that year he published an exhortation to his brother Thomas to embrace the Reformed religion.

Early in 1539 Thomas Cromwell took Traheron into his service, and Lord Chancellor Audley seems to have befriended him. After Cromwell's fall he left court and retired into the country, where in May 1542 he was credited with an intention marry and keep a grammar school. Before the end of Henry VIII's reign Traheron found it advisable again to go abroad, and in 1546 he was with John Calvin at Geneva. Traheron gradually abandoned Bullinger's views, and adopted Calvin's doctrine of predestination and anti-sacramentarian dogmas.

In 1547 he returned to England, and was Member of Parliament for Barnstaple. The main question at the time was the doctrine of the Eucharist to be adopted in the Book of Common Prayer, on which the Windsor commission was then sitting. Traheron was for clarity of reform but was in the minority. Early in 1549 he had a controversy with John Hooper on predestination. On 14 December of that year he was on John Cheke's recommendation appointed keeper of the king's library with a salary of twenty marks in succession to Roger Ascham, and in February 1549–50 the council nominated him tutor to the young Henry Brandon, 2nd Duke of Suffolk at Cambridge.

On Suffolk's death (16 July 1551) Traheron again retired into the country, and occupied himself with the study of Greek. In September William Cecil suggested to him that he might be of use in the church, and proposed his election a Dean of Chichester. Traheron was not in holy orders, but on 29 September the council wrote to the chapter of Chichester Cathedral urging his election as dean. The chapter made some difficulty, and it was not till 8 January 1552 that Traheron was elected. Meanwhile, on 6 October and again on 10 February 1552, he had been nominated one of the civilians on the commission to reform the canon laws. His position at Chichester was troubled, and in 1552 he resigned the deanery, receiving instead a canonry at Windsor in September.

On Queen Mary's accession Traheron resigned his patent as keeper of the royal library and went abroad. In 1555 he was at Frankfurt, taking part in the "troubles" there as an adherent of Richard Cox, who, in opposition to John Knox's party, wished to retain the English service-book; and when the congregation at Frankfort was remodelled after Knox's expulsion, Traheron was appointed a divinity lecturer. Soon afterwards he seems to have moved to Wesel, where he lectured on the New Testament.

Traheron probably died at Wesel in 1558. His daughter Magdalen married Thomas Bowyer of Leythorne, Sussex.

== Works ==
In 1543 he dedicated to Richard Tracy his translation of John of Vigo, 'The moste Excellent Workes of Chirurgerye made and set forthe by maister John Vigon, heed chirurgien of our tyme in Italie,' London (other editions 1550, 1571, 1586).

He contributed to the Epigrammata Varia, London, 1551, published on the death of Martin Bucer. In 1557 he published 'An Exposition of a parte of S. Iohannes Gospel made in sondrie readinges in the English congregation at Wesel by Bartho. Traherõ, and now published against the wicked enterprises of new sterte up Arians in Englande,' Wesel?; another edition was issued in 1558. In 1557 Traheron also published 'An expositiõ of the 4 chap. of S. Joans Reuelation made by Bar. Traheron in sondrie readings before his contremen in Germaine,' Wesel?; other editions, London, 1573, and London, 1577. Two other works followed in 1558, an 'Answere made by Bar. Traheron to a privie papiste which crepte in to the English congregation of Christian exiles ...,' Wesel?, and 'A Warning to England to repente and to turn to god from idolatrie and poperie by the terrible example of Calece given 7 March Anno C. 1558 by Benthalmai Outis [i.e. Bartholomew Traheron], ...,' Wesel?

He published also 'Ad Thomam fratrem Parænesis,' Frankfurt, 1538, has verses in 'Johannis Parkhursti Ludicra sive Epigrammata,' 1573, wrote various letters to Bullinger which are printed in 'Original Letters' (Parker Society), and is credited by John Bale with the authorship of 'In mortem Henrici Dudlæi carmen i.,' ‘In mortem senioris Viati [Wyatt] carmen i.,' ‘In testamentum G. Tracy lib. i.,' and 'Epistolarum et Carminum lib. i.’

== Notes ==
Attribution

This article incorporates text from a publication now in the public domain: "Traheron, Bartholomew". Dictionary of National Biography. London: Smith, Elder & Co. 1885–1900.
