= Estcourt Cresswell =

Member of the Parliament of the United Kingdom for Cirencester
- In office 1768–1774 Serving with James Whitshed

Personal details
- Born: c.1745
- Died: 4 July 1823 (aged 78) Bath, Somerset
- Parent: Thomas Estcourt Cresswell

Estcourt Cresswell (c.1745 – 4 July 1823) was an English politician.

His father Thomas Estcourt Cresswell was also a Member of Parliament.
