= Vox Piscis =

1627 book by John Frith

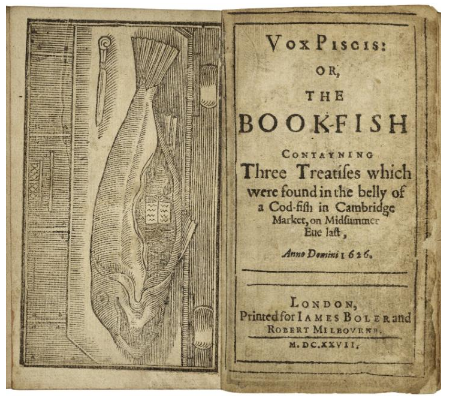
Vox Piscis

Vox Piscis, or The Book-Fish, contayning three treatises which were found in the belly of a cod-fish in Cambridge market, on Midsummer Eve last Anno Domini 1626 is a book published in 1627 with a very unusual origin.

The original text of the work was found in the belly of a fish. On June 23, 1626, a fishmonger in the Cambridge market found a small thin book (size sextodecimo) wrapped in sailcloth inside the stomach of a cod caught at King's Lynn.

Among the witnesses at the market was scholar and theologian Dr. Joseph Mede of Christ's College, and he took upon himself the task of identifying the book. Most of the book had been completely consumed by the fish, but three chapters "in the middle parts" remained readable, and Mede carefully transcribed the contents. The texts were then edited and published as a book titled Vox Piscis the next year, with a preface written by Cambridge scholar Thomas Goad.

According to the Cambridge editors of the Vox Piscis, all three texts were attributed to the Protestant reformer John Frith (1503-1533), one of the earlist English Protestant martyrs. Modern bibliographical research reveals that only one of the three texts, "A Mirror, or, Glasse to know thyselfe", was written by John Frith in 1532. The text "The Treasure of Knowledge" is a collection of prayers and extracts from the Bible from an unknown author, first published ca. 1534. The final text, "Of the Preparation to the Crosse, and to Death", was the work of another early Protestant reformer, Richard Tracy, and was first published in 1540.

The book was found and published amidst the political and religious tension at the early years of Charles I of England's reign, who just assumed the throne in 1625 and made the Duke of Buckingham - already a very controversial figure - as the Chancellor of the University of Cambridge in 1626. The re-publishing of a protestant martyr's treatises found in such an extraordinary way can be seen as both a commentary and reflection of the anxieties of the early Caroline era.

It is not known how the original book came to be inside the fish.

== Contents ==
- Preface
- "Praeparatio Crucem or Of the Preparation to the Crosse, and to Death"
- "The Treasure of Knowledge"
- "A Mirror, or, Glasse to know thyselfe"
