= Wootton Bassett (constituency) =

Former parliamentary constituency in the United Kingdom

- Former borough constituency for the House of Commons

1447–1832
- Seats: Two

Wootton Bassett was a parliamentary borough in Wiltshire, which elected two Members of Parliament (MPs) to the House of Commons from 1447 until 1832, when the rotten borough was abolished by the Great Reform Act.

== History ==
The borough consisted of the town of Wootton Bassett, a market town in northern Wiltshire. Even when the borough was created by Henry VI it was a town of little consequence, with no significant industry or trade; by the 19th century it suffered from endemic unemployment, and the money to be gained by electoral corruption was probably one of its economic mainstays.

In 1831, the population of the borough was approximately 1,500, and contained 349 houses. The right to vote was exercised by all inhabitant householders paying scot and lot. At the last contested election, this amounted to 309 eligible voters, of whom 228 cast valid votes; in other words, only a comparatively small proportion of households were excluded from the franchise. The local landowners were generally recognised as "patrons" of the borough, and at most periods were able to exercise close control as they were the employers of the majority of the voters. However, they were occasionally vulnerable to the intervention of monied outsiders, since Wootton Bassett's voters had few scruples at selling their votes to the highest bidder.

At the end of the 17th century, the St John family of Lydiard Tregoze had the predominant influence in the borough, and could usually return their chosen candidates without difficulty, the main competing interest being that of the Hydes. After Henry St John, 1st Viscount Bolingbroke fled abroad in 1715 following the Jacobite Rebellion the St John influence was weakened, and a wealthy local landowner and clothier, Robert Neale of Corsham, was able to secure election in 1741. Neale then began to strengthen his interest, hoping to gain control of the second seat in alliance with the Hydes, and this led to a vigorous contest for control of the borough in the 1750s.

Corruption was playing its part in Wootton Bassett elections at least from the late 17th century. In 1690, a candidate who petitioned against the election of Henry St John was found to have bribed the voters himself, reportedly purchasing votes at one-and-a-half guineas a head, and his agent was taken into custody by order of the House of Commons. Again in 1700, bribery was reported to the committee and the agent was committed to Newgate Prison.

At the election of 1754, Robert Neale attempted to win the support of the Mayor (who was ex officio returning officer) with a bribe of £500, and both sides spent lavishly. The St John candidates (John Probyn and Thomas Estcourt Cresswell) paid 30 guineas a head to voters, the total cost including treating at taverns coming to £6000, while Neale admitted spending £1800 and his co-candidate the Earl of Drumlanrig probably spent a similar amount. St John's candidates were successful, but Neale petitioned against the outcome and (as a supporter of the government) apparently expected a partisan decision to overturn the result in his favour. In the event, the Duke of Newcastle, then serving as the prime minister, refused to support the petition but Neale was compensated £1000 from secret government funds.

After another contested election in election of 1784, when George Tierney, backed by the Hydes, spent £2500 in an unsuccessful attempt to win a seat against the St John candidates, the two families reached an agreement to nominate one MP each at future elections. This lasted until the early years of the following century when a barrister, James Kibblewhite, began to acquire property in the town and secured both a majority on the Corporation and sufficient "influence" with the voters to have his candidates returned as MPs – the nature of the influence is indicated by reports that the price of a vote had risen to 45 guineas a man. When Benjamin Walsh, who was elected on this occasion, was shortly afterwards declared bankrupt it emerged on the investigation of his accounts that he had paid £4000 for his seat. Kibblewhite sold his interest in the borough to Joseph Pitt for £22,000, but Pitt was unable to retain control over the voters despite his domination of the corporation and the St Johns and Hydes once more resumed the patronage.

Perhaps surprisingly, the corruption at Wootton Bassett never led to a major scandal or to any attempts to disfranchise the borough – unlike nearby Cricklade, which was "thrown into the hundred" for its misdemeanours in the 1770s, or Hindon which nearly suffered the same fate. However, the town was far too small to justify separate representation after the Great Reform Act, and the constituency was abolished in 1832. The town was within the penally-expanded boundaries of Cricklade, which retained both its MPs, and was thereafter part of that borough constituency.

== Members of Parliament ==
=== 1447–1640 ===
Parliament	First member	Second member
1449–1450	John Daunt	
1510–1523	No names known	
1529	Richard Tracy	Walter Winston
1536	?	
1539	?	
1542	?	
1545	Edmund Brydges	Hugh Westwood
1547	John Seymour	Robert Huick
1553 (Mar)	Gabriel Pleydell	William Garrard
1553 (Oct)	Henry Poole	John Throckmorton
1554 (Apr)	John Tull	Giles Payne
1554 (Nov)	Giles Payne	William Hampshire
1555	Edmund Plowden	Richard Bruning
1558	Richard Bruning	Humphrey Moseley
1559	Christopher Dysmars	Humphrey Moseley
1562–3	John Hippisley, sat for Wells replaced Jan 1563 by Matthew Poyntz	Gabriel Pleydell
1571	Henry Knyvet	John Winchcombe
1572	Henry Knyvet	Edmund Dunch
1584	Thomas Vavasour	John Hungerford
1586	Thomas Vavasour	John Hungerford
1589	Sir Henry Knyvet	John Hungerford
1593	John Hungerford	William Meredith
1597	Henry Dacre	John Lowe
1601	John Wentworth	John Rice
1604–1611	Henry Martin	Alexander Tutt
1614	Sir William Willoughby	Edward Hungerford
1621	Richard Harrison	John Wrenham
1624	Sir Roland Egerton	John Bankes
1625	Robert Hyde	Sir Walter Tichborne
1626	Sir John Francklyn	Sir Thomas Lake
1628	Sir John Francklyn	Anthony Rous
1629–1640	No Parliaments summoned	

=== 1640–1832 ===
Year	First member	First party	Second member	Second party
April 1640	Thomas Windebanke		Edward Hyde	
November 1640	William Pleydell	Royalist	Edward Poole	Parliamentarian
February 1644	Pleydell disabled from sitting – seat vacant		Edward Poole	Parliamentarian
1645	Edward Massie		Edward Poole	Parliamentarian
December 1648	Massie and Poole excluded in Pride's Purge – both seats vacant			
1653	Unrepresented in the Barebones Parliament and the First and Second Parliaments of the Protectorate			
January 1659	Henry St John		Robert Stevens	
May 1659	Not represented in the restored Rump			
April 1660	John Pleydell		Lord Herbert of Raglan	
June 1660	John Pleydell		Sir Baynham Throckmorton	
1661	John Pleydell		Sir Walter St John	
February 1679	John Pleydell		Laurence Hyde	
August 1679	Henry St John		Laurence Hyde	
1681	Henry St John		John Pleydell	
1689	Henry St John		John Wildman	
1695	Thomas Jacob		Henry Pinnell	
1698	Henry St John		Henry Pinnell	
January 1701	Henry St John		Henry Pinnell	
November 1701	Henry St John		Thomas Jacob	
1702	Henry St John		Henry Pinnell	
1705	Henry St John		John Morton Pleydell	
1706	Henry St John		Francis Popham	
1708	Robert Cecil		Francis Popham	
October 1710	Henry St John		Richard Goddard	
December 1710	Edmund Pleydell		Richard Goddard	
1713	Edmund Pleydell		Richard Cresswell	
1715	Sir James Long		William Northey	
1722	Colonel Robert Murray		William Chetwynd	
1727	John St John		John Crosse	
1734	Sir Robert Long		Captain Nicholas Robinson	
1741	Robert Neale		John Harvey-Thursby	
1747	Robert Neale		Martin Madan	
1754	John Probyn		Thomas Estcourt Cresswell	
1761	Major the Hon. Henry St John		Thomas Estcourt Cresswell	
1774	Major the Hon. Henry St John		Robert Scott	
1780	Major the Hon. Henry St John		William Strahan	
1784	Hon. George North		Hon. Robert Seymour Conway	
1790	John Thomas Stanley		The Viscount Downe	
1796	John Denison		Edward Clarke	
July 1802	General the Hon. Henry St John		Robert Williams	
December 1802	Peter William Baker	Tory	Robert Williams	
1806	Robert Knight	Whig	Robert Williams	
1807	Sir John Murray	Tory	John Cheesment	Tory
1808	Sir John Murray	Tory	Benjamin Walsh	
1811	Robert Knight	Whig	Benjamin Walsh	
March 1812	Robert Knight	Whig	John Attersoll	Whig
October 1812	James Kibblewhite	Whig	John Attersoll	Whig
March 1813	Richard Ellison		John Attersoll	Whig
April 1813	Richard Ellison		Robert Rickards	
1816	Richard Ellison		William Taylor Money	
1820	Horace Twiss	Tory	Sir George Philips Bt	Whig
1830	Viscount Mahon	Tory	Thomas Hyde Villiers	Whig
1831	Viscount Mahon	Tory	Viscount Porchester	Tory
1832	Constituency abolished			
