= John Hungerford (c. 1560 – 1636) =

English MP

John Hungerford (ca. 1560 – 1636) was an English MP.

He was the eldest of Walter Hungerford of Cadenham manor, Foxham, Wiltshire and his wife Frances, daughter of John Cock of Broxbourne, Hertfordshire. He was admitted to the Inner Temple in 1580.

He was elected MP for the constituency of Wootton Bassett through four successive parliaments between 1584 and 1593. In 1604 he was chosen to represent Chippenham, following a Court of Chancery case that had decided in favour of the town's freemen.

He was a Justice of the Peace for Wiltshire by 1594 and was appointed sheriff for 1605–06.

He married Elizabeth (d. 1650), the daughter of Sir Thomas Estcourt of Shipton Moyne, Gloucestershire around 1596. In 1623 they had 5 sons and 3 daughters. His heir Edward was the father of George Hungerford (MP) and his daughter Frances married Francis Keate of East Lockinge, Berkshire.

He died 29 March 1636 at Cadenham, leaving more than 1,500 acres of land in Wiltshire and Berkshire to his heir.
