= Humphrey Moseley (MP) =

16th-century English politician

Humphrey Moseley (by 1526 – 4 July 1592) was an English politician.

== Life ==
Moseley was the second son of Nicholas and Elizabeth Moseley, and married Margaret Heigham, daughter of the MP Clement Heigham. They had four sons and at least one daughter.

== Career ==
Moseley was a Member of Parliament for Marlborough in 1547, Mitchell in March 1553, Aylesbury in April 1554, Gatton in 1555, and Wootton Bassett in 1558 and 1559.
