= George Strahan (publisher) =

George Strahan (c. 1679 – 12 November 1752) was a Scots bookseller and publisher based in London in the 18th century.

Strahan should not be confused with George Strachan, a solicitor in Edinburgh who was the father of William Strahan (1715–1785), another London-based publisher. However, George Strahan was involved with William in some minor business transactions.
