= Henry Poole (died 1580) =

English politician

Henry Poole (by 1526 – 1580) was an English politician.

He was a Member (MP) of the Parliament of England for Wootton Bassett during October 1553.

He was a younger son of Leonard Poole of Sapperton, Gloucestershire and his wife Catherine, daughter of Sir Gyles Brydges of Coberley, Gloucestershire. By 1549 he was a gentleman pensioner to Edward VI. In 1553 he supported Queen Mary. He owed his seat in the 1553 parliament to his uncle John Brydges, 1st Baron Chandos, the patron of Wotton Bassett.

He married Margaret Nevill, daughter of George Nevill, 5th Baron Bergavenny and widow of John Cheyney (d. 1544), with whom he had six sons. By the 1570s the couple had settled at Ditchling, Sussex, one of the manors held by the Nevilles and presumably settled on Margaret as part of the marriage agreement. He also held land at Keymer, Sussex. In 1576 the park at Ditchling was settled on Margaret and her sons John and Francis for life by her brother, Henry Nevill, 6th Baron Bergavenny.

He died at Ditchling on 28 March 1580, where a monument was erected to him according to the instructions in his will in St Margaret's church. In his will he left property in Somerset and Blackfriars, London in addition to his Sussex estate. Shortly after his death two of his sons were part of a gang suspected of robbery.
