= Giovanni da Vigo =

Italian surgeon

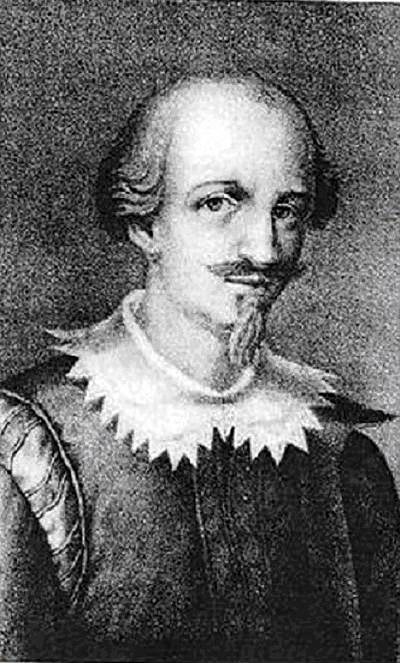

Giovanni da Vigo (1450–1525) was an Italian surgeon. He studied under Battista di Rapallo, surgeon to the Marquis of Saluzzo. His early years of practice were spent in Genoa and a statue of him can be found in front of the old Civic hospital in Rapallo. In 1495 Vigo moved to Savona and became acquainted with Cardinal Giuliano della Rovere. When the Cardinal was made Pope Julius II in 1503, he took Vigo with him to Rome, appointing him as his official surgeon. He was with the Pope in the attack on Bologna and cured the Pope of a nodule on his hand.

In 1514 Vigo published Practica in arte chirurgica copiosa a comprehensive work on surgery composed of nine books and written in Latin. He dedicated it to his son, Luigi. In it Vigo wrote about anatomy, medications and the treatment of apostome, ulcers, wounds, diseases and fractures and dislocations.

The book on wounds included one of the earliest discussions of the treatment of wounds caused by firearms. He assumed that the victims of such wounds were poisoned by gunpowder and recommended treatment with boiling oil in order to counteract the poison. Ambroise Paré in 1536, as surgeon to colonel-general Mareschal de Montjean discovered that such treatment was counter-productive and recommends different treatments. The book on diseases discussed the French Disease (which is generally equated with modern-day Syphilis).

In 1517, Vigo published Practica compendiosa which covered most of the same material as his Practica in a much more condensed form. Vigo's two books were commonly printed together after that and often along with another compendium of surgery by Mariano Santo who had been a student of Vigo's and who would later become famous for his work on the treatment of bladder stones.

Although he is generally known today only for his mistaken treatment of gunshot wounds, Vigo's first book on surgery was enormously successful. It was translated into English, Latin, Italian, Spanish, and French and reprinted dozens of times in the sixteenth and seventeenth centuries making him one of the best known surgeons of his day.

== Works ==
- Practica in arte chirurgica copiosa (Rome, 1514). The book went through numerous editions and translations. The 1519 Latin edition is on line
- Practica compendiosa (Rome, 1517). Often printed with the Practica.
- An English translation by Bartholomew Traheron entitled ‘The moste Excellent Workes of Chirurgerye made and set forthe by maister John Vigon, heed chirurgien of our tyme in Italie was published in 1543.

== See also ==
- Gunpowder warfare
