= John Seymour (died 1552) =

English politician

John Seymour (by 1518 – 1552), of London, was an English politician.

He was a member (MP) of the parliament of England for Wootton Bassett in 1547.
